= Yakovlev Yak-7 =

1940 fighter aircraft family by Yakovlev

Yak-7 (UTI-26)
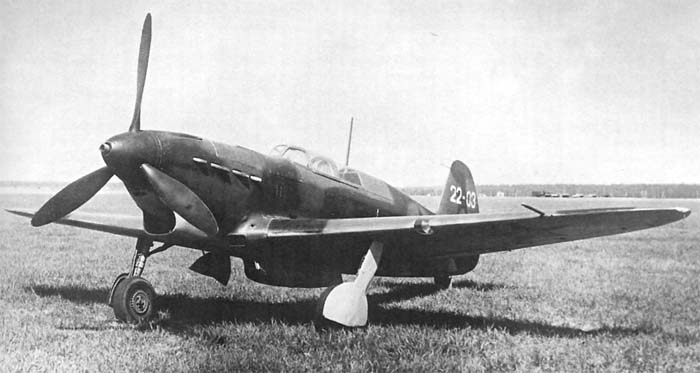
- Yak-7B/M-105PA serial N°22-03 (3rd production batch, 22nd aircraft) during its trials at the NII VVS (Air Force Scientific Test Institute).

General information
- Type: Fighter, trainer
- Manufacturer: Yakovlev
- Designer: Alexander Sergeevich Yakovlev
- Status: Retired
- Primary user: Soviet Air Force

History
- Manufactured: 6,399
- Introduction date: 1942
- First flight: 23 July 1940
- Retired: 1946
- Developed from: Yakovlev Yak-1
- Developed into: Yakovlev Yak-9

The Yakovlev Yak-7 (Russian: Яковлев Як-7; NATO reporting name: Mark) was developed from the earlier Yak-1 fighter, initially as a trainer but converted into a fighter. As both a fighter and later reverting to its original training role, the Yak-7 proved to be a capable aircraft and was well liked by air crews. The Yak-7 was simpler, tougher and generally better than the Yak-1.

== Design and development ==
In 1939, Alexander Yakovlev designed a tandem-seat advanced trainer, originally designated "I-27" and then "UTI-26", offered along with the original I-26 proposal that became the Yak-1. The "UTI" (Uchebno Trenirovochnyi Istrebitel, translated as: Training Fighter) was intended to give pilots-in-training experience on a high-performance aircraft before transitioning to a fighter. With development work started in 1940, the UTI-26 differed from its predecessor in its larger span wing being placed farther back for balance as well as having two cockpits with dual controls and a rudimentary communication system. It was armed with a single 7.62 mm (0.30 in) ShKAS machine gun in the cowling, mainly for use in training, but Yakovlev envisioned a multi-purpose aircraft that could also undertake courier and light transport duties at the front.

The first production aircraft known as Yak-7UTIs retained a retractable main landing gear, but beginning in the summer of 1941, a fixed landing gear variant, the Yak-7V (Vyvozoni for Familiarization) was substituted. The factory reasoned that production would be simplified and that reduced performance would not be detrimental for a trainer. Yak-7UTIs and Yak-7Vs were also equipped with skis for winter operations.

A factory team from N° 301, headed by K.A. Sinelshchikov, was detached from the Yakovlev OKB to supervise production of Yak-7UTI. One of these aircraft (serial number 04-11) was fitted with an armored backrest plate over the rear position, self-sealing fuel tanks which filled with inert gas as they emptied, three "RO" rocket launchers under each wing for as many RS-82 rockets, an axial motornaya pushka-mount 20 mm (0.79 in) ShVAK cannon firing through the propeller spinner, with 120 rounds, and two 7.62 mm ShKAS machine guns under the cowling, each with 750 rounds. The rear cockpit position was retained, allowing it to accommodate a second seat (without controls) for fast courier and transport duties or a fuel tank for extended range. The additional space could also house bombs or other gear. The engine was an M-105P and the model was designated Yak-7/M-105P.

Sinelshchikov did not inform Yakovlev about the conversion and when he learned about it, Yakovlev remained skeptical of the need for the changes. After brief factory trials, the aircraft turned out to be better than the single-seat Yak-1, thanks to the modifications already applied to the UTI as well as a revised undercarriage with bigger tires and wheels, more efficient brakes and revised elevators, among other changes. Yakovlev submitted the Yak-7 to the authorities who approved it immediately. The firing tests at the scientific trials Polygon for aircraft armament (NIPAV) were a success and the armament was found to have no effect on the flight characteristics or the general performances of the new fighter. The aircraft's stability as a firing platform was judged far better than that of the Yak-1, the Lavochkin-Gorbunov-Gudkov LaGG-3 and Mikoyan-Gurevich MiG-3.

The GKO and the NKAP issued decrees in August 1941 for the Yak-7 to be produced by Factories N° 301 and N° 153, but Factory N° 301 had to be evacuated to Novosibirsk where it merged with N° 153. So, just 62 aircraft were produced in 1941: 51 in September–October by Factory N° 301 and 11 by N° 153 in December. Test pilot A.N. Lazarev noted the good flight characteristics, how easy it was to get out of a spin, and how well it behaved when diving: characteristics that he considered safer than those of the Yak-1. But the Yak-7 showed some defects: the M-105P engine piping, the landing gear locking system, the tires and the tail wheel were identified. The Yak-7 was introduced into the production line and the first batch of 60 reached operational squadrons by the end of 1941.

Another important variant was the Yak-7/M-105PA. On this model, the two ShKAS on the cowling had been replaced by two 12.7 mm (0.50 in) UBS machine guns with 400 rounds (260 for the left and 140 for the right). It was powered by an M-105PA engine with an axial ShVAK cannon with 120 rounds. Oil and glycol radiators had been widened and refined and slightly tilted downward. The insulation of the airframe was improved, the tail wheel was totally retractable; joints and skin were more carefully made; the panels on the engine cowling fitted better; the propeller reduction gear worked better; an electro-pneumatic reloading system was installed; the canopy frame was reinforced. The Yak-7B made 27 tests flights in January and February 1942. The reports noted that while the aircraft "was not inferior to the LaGG-3 and MiG-3 and to foreign fighters in service in the USSR", it was more stable and had better flight characteristics. Subsequently, the GKO authorised production at Factory N° 153 in place of the Yak-7A, from April 1942 and 261 machines were built until July. After 20 May, the aircraft were equipped with a 68 L (18 US gal) tank behind the pilot's seat, but the pilots that used the Yak-7 on Stalingrad and on the Kuban removed it as it was not protected and affected the flight characteristics. Generally, the Yak-7B pleased its pilots. They reported that it was easy to fly at all altitudes, stable and easy to maintain and although it did not climb as quickly as a Messerschmitt Bf 109, it was as manoeuvrable and fast, except in the vertical plane. But defects were also noted: there was too much drag from the radiators, the canopy glass was of bad quality; the pilot was not protected enough, taking-off and landing distances were too long and, above all, it was underpowered.

Yakovlev suggested to Klimov, the engine builder, some modifications that resulted in the M-105PF which was 130 hp (97 kW) more powerful. With this modified engine, the Yak-7B top speed was of 599 km/h (372 mph), it climbed much faster up to 5,000 m (16,000 ft) and it was more manoeuvrable both in the horizontal and the vertical planes. But because the rear tank was removed, its range was reduced and the center of gravity was moved too far forward, while M-105 defects (glycol and oil overheating, oil leaks etc.) persisted.

Among the engine and armament options was the Yak-7-37 fitted with a 37 mm (1.457 in) MPSh-37 cannon, (MPSh - motornaya pushka Shpital'novo - engine mounted Shpital'nyy cannon), mounted between the engine cylinder blocks, firing through the propeller spinner.

== Operational history ==
The Yak-7 proved to be an effective close support fighter although the first two-seaters were considered nose-heavy, consequently, the factory introduced a rear cockpit fuel tank. Pilots complained about the fuel tank's vulnerability since it was unarmored, and it was usually removed in the field. There were constant changes to the design based on combat observations including a definitive single-seat variant, the Yak-7B, which was produced in large numbers.

After the war, some Yak-7V trainers were provided to the Poles and a single Yak-7V was delivered to the Hungarians for familiarization with the Yak-9 fighter.

After trials in April–May 1942, a small batch of 22 Yak-7-37s was authorised, all of which were issued to the 42nd Fighter Aviation Regiment (IAP) at the North-Western front, where they proved highly successful both in air-to-air combat and ground attack.

== Variants ==
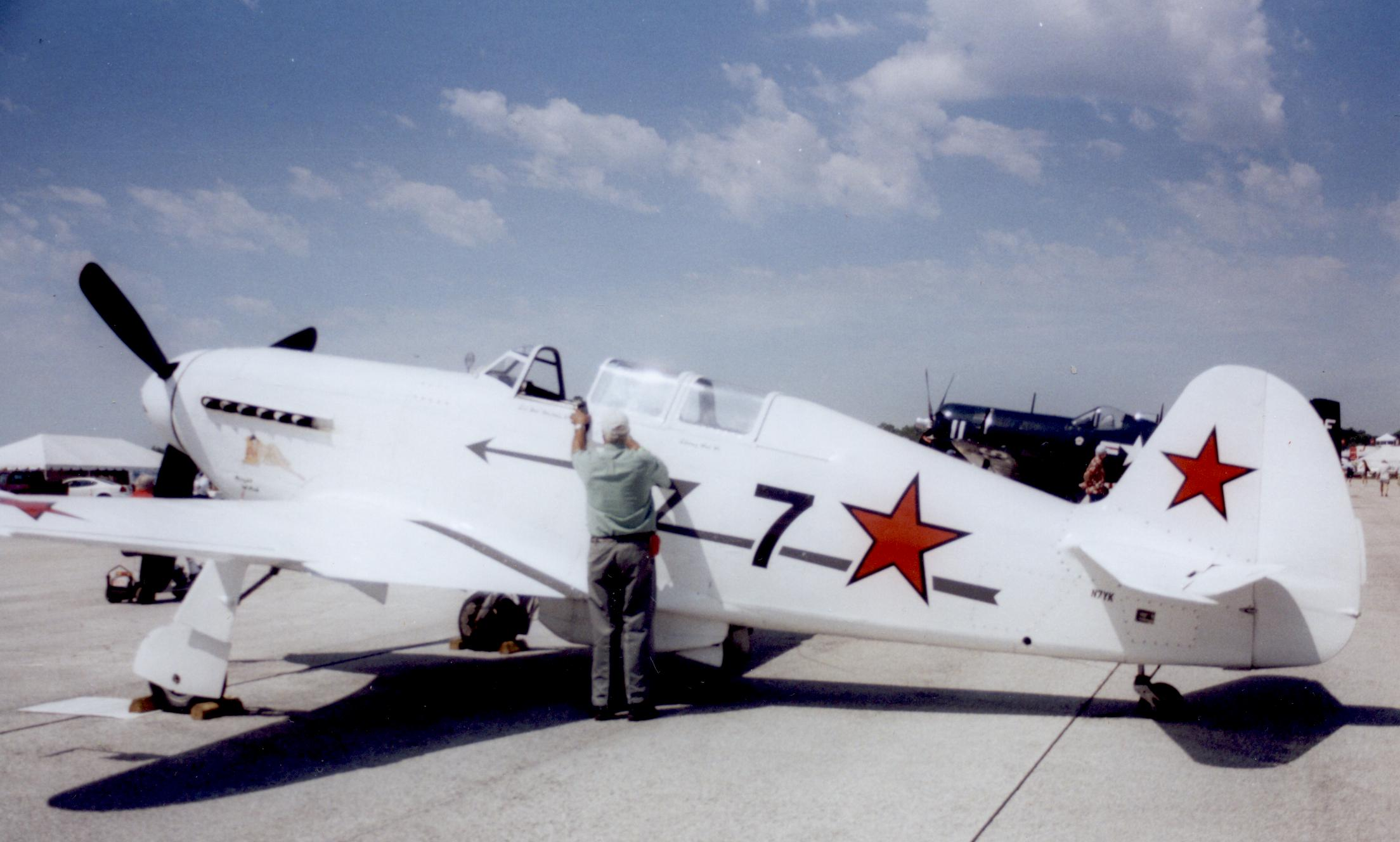
LET C-11 modified to Yak-7 outline, Lakeland, Florida, in April 2007

Ya-27
two-seat prototype converted from a pre-serial I-26
Yak-7UTI
initial two-seat communication/trainer version, 186 built in 1941
Yak-7V
(vyvoznoy) two-seat trainer; 510 built in 1942/43 + 87 converted from Yak-7B
Yak-7
single-seat fighter version, based on the Yak-7UTI, armor + more guns added, small number built 1941/42
Yak-7-37
After trials in April–May 1942, a small batch of 22 Yak-7-37s was authorised, fitted with a MPSh-37 37 mm (1.457 in) cannon, (MPSh - motornaya pushka Shpital'novo - engine mounted Shpital'nyy cannon), mounted between the engine cylinder blocks, firing through the propeller spinner. Two 12.7 mm (0.500 in) UBS machine guns were also fitted in the forward fuselage firing above the engine.
Yak-7A
improved Yak-7, about 300 built in early 1942
Yak-7B
upgraded version of Yak-7A (reduced wingspan, simplified landing gear, better equipment), about 5,000 were built.
Yak-7D
long range prototype, development basis for the Yak-7DI/Yak-9.
Yak-7K courier
VIP transport version. converted from Yak-7B, 1944.
Yak-7U Mark
Yak-7PVRD
experimental - had two DM-4 ramjet under wings, top speed: 800 km/h (500 mph). Two were built.
Yak-7DI
long range fighter, redesignated Yak-9.
Yak-7 M-82
- new (M-82) engine version. tested in 1941.
Yak-7R
Jet project with one liquid fuel jet and two ramjets. 1942.
Yak-7R
purported jet version of Yak-7 with Jumo 004 engine. Said to have been built in Tbilisi to fly over Red Square at the parade in 1947.
Yak-7R
Yak-3 with Jumo 004 turbojet. Development started not later than 1945. First flown in 1946?
Yak-7T
two aircraft for testing engine mounted heavy cannons (NS-37 and NS-45 37 mm (1.457 in) and 45 mm (1.772 in) calibre respectively).

== Operators ==
Albania

- Albanian Air Force 1945 operated 20 Yak-7V two-seat trainer. And 30 Yak-7A improved Yak-7 single-seat fighter enter service. Total 50.

France

- Free French Air Force operated some in the Normandie-Niemen squadron

Bulgaria

- Bulgarian Air Force operated three Yak-7V.

Hungary

- Hungarian Air Force operated one Yak-7V for familiarization with the Yak-9 fighter.

Mongolia

- Mongolian People's Air Force operated some aircraft as trainers

Poland

- The Polish Air Force in Soviet Union operated a few Yak-7Bs for training in the 1st Fighter Regiment "Warszawa". Several Yak-7Vs were used for training and courier duties. Yak-7s were operated by the Polish Air Force between September 1943 till September 23, 1946.

Soviet Union

- Soviet Air Force

Yugoslavia

- SFR Yugoslav Air Force operated two Yak-7V.

== Survivors ==
Latvia

- Yak 7B - Serial 33153120. Under restoration to airworthy condition by SIA Aero Restorations using original Klimov 105 engine.

Russia

- Yak 7B - Under restoration since 2002 in St Petersburg for private individual.
- Yak 7 - On display at the Museum of the Air Force of the Northern Fleet, in Safonovo, Safonovsky District, Smolensk Oblast. Displayed as "White 23".

United Kingdom

- Yak 7B - Serial 4515364. In storage pending restoration by the Historic Aircraft Collection

== Reproductions ==
Only one Yak-7B have been restored to airworthy condition as of March 2026, it is an ex-Egyptian Air Force Yak-11 which has been reconfigured to a Yak 7B.

== Specifications (Yak-7A M-105PA) ==
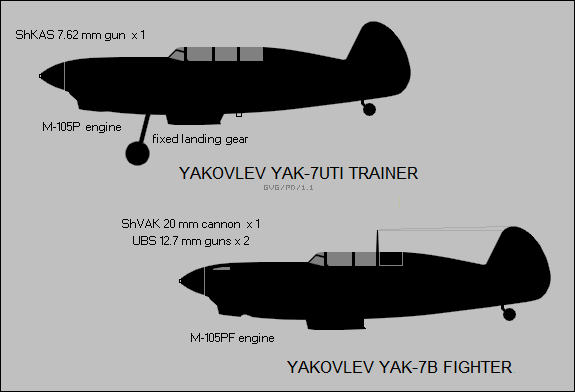

Data from OKB Yakovlev

General characteristics

- Crew: 1
- Length: 8.48 m (27 ft 10 in)
- Wingspan: 10 m (32 ft 10 in)
- Wing area: 17.15 m^{2} (184.6 sq ft)
- Empty weight: 2,450 kg (5,401 lb)
- Gross weight: 2,935 kg (6,471 lb)
- Powerplant: 1 × M-105PA V-12 liquid-cooled piston engine, 780 kW (1,050 hp) at rated altitude

Performance

- Maximum speed: 495 km/h (308 mph, 267 kn) at sea level

571 km/h (355 mph; 308 kn) at 5,000 m (16,000 ft)

- Range: 643 km (400 mi, 347 nmi)
- Service ceiling: 9,500 m (31,200 ft)
- Rate of climb: 12 m/s (2,400 ft/min)
- Time to altitude: 5,000 m (16,000 ft) in 6.4 minutes
- Wing loading: 172.6 kg/m^{2} (35.4 lb/sq ft)
- Power/mass: 0.26 kW/kg (0.16 hp/lb)
- Take-off run: 410 m (1,350 ft)
- Landing run: 610 m (2,000 ft)
- Sustained turn time: 21 - 22 seconds

Armament

- 1 × 20 mm (0.787 in) ShVAK cannon
- 2 × 7.62 mm (0.300 in) ShKAS machine guns. Later models like the "B", used x2 12.7mm Berezin UB guns.

== See also ==
Related development

- Yak-1
- Yak-3
- Yak-9

Aircraft of comparable role, configuration, and era

- Hawker Hurricane

Related lists

- List of aircraft of World War II
- List of military aircraft of the Soviet Union and the CIS
