= Cloherty =

Cloherty is a surname. Notable people with the surname include:

- Colin Cloherty (born 1987), American football player
- Patricia Cloherty, American businesswoman
