= Stanislav Shatalin =

Soviet and Russian economist (1934–1997)

- Станислав Шаталин
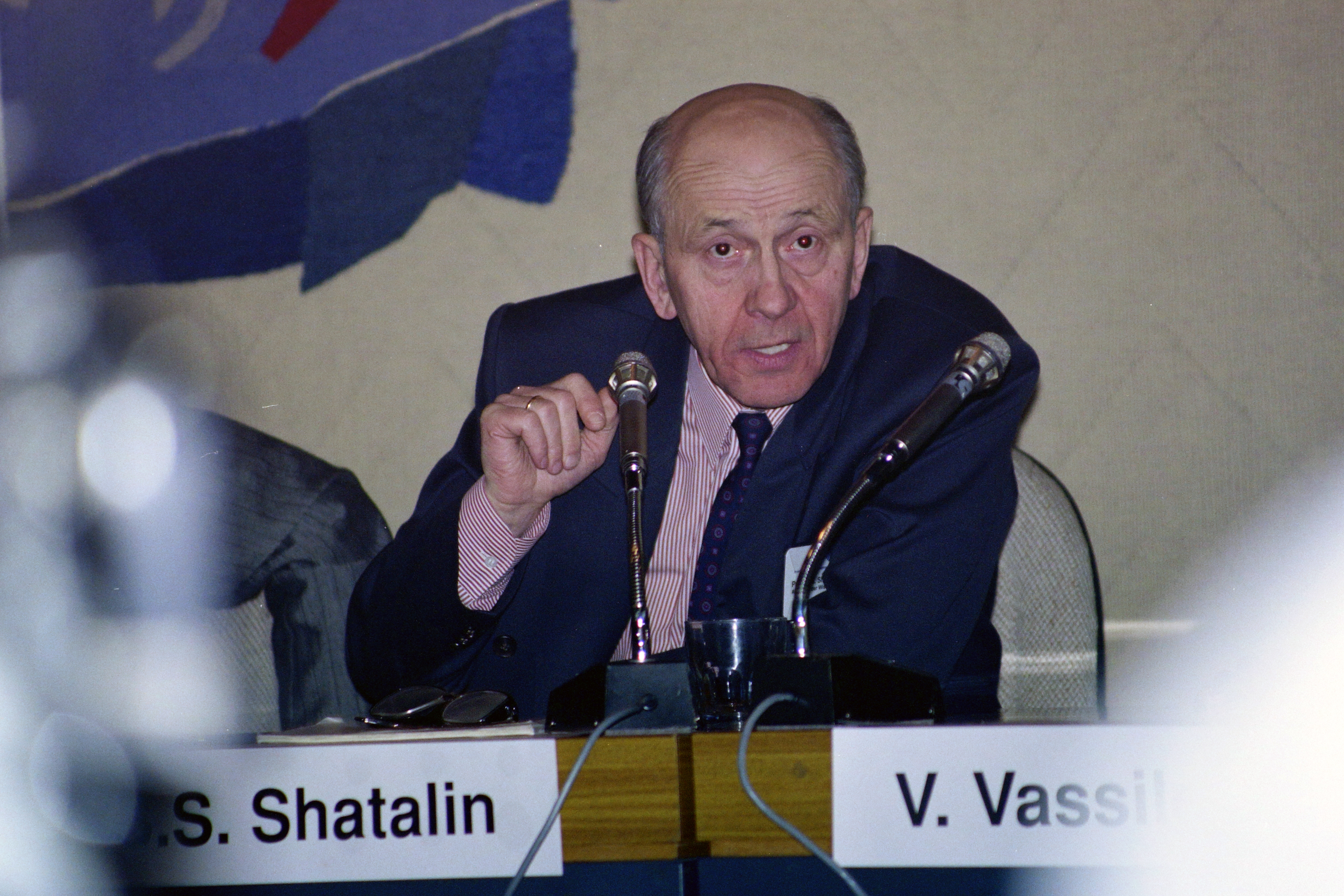
- International Management Talk 1991
- Born: 24 August 1934; Detskoye Selo, Leningrad Oblast, Russian SFSR, Soviet Union (now Pushkin, Saint Petersburg, Russia)
- Died: 3 March 1997 (aged 62); Moscow, Russia
- Resting place: Kuntsevo Cemetery, Moscow
- Years active: 1958–1997

Academic background
- Education: Moscow State University (1958)
- Academic advisor: Leonid Kantorovich
- Influences: Hayek

Academic work
- School or tradition: Lausanne School
- Institutions: USSR Gosplan Economic Institute; Academy of Sciences of the Soviet Union; Russian Academy of Sciences
- Notable students: Petr Aven, Yegor Gaidar
- Awards: USSR State Prize (1968)

Stanislav Sergeyevich Shatalin (Russian: Станисла́в Серге́евич Шата́лин; 24 August 1934 – 3 March 1997) was a Soviet and Russian economist. A corresponding member of the Academy of Sciences of the Soviet Union from 1974 and an academic from 1987, Shatalin played an important role in economic reforms shortly before and following the dissolution of the Soviet Union, when he promoted the policies of decentralisation and privatisation in an effort to improve productivity. Although he was the primary author of the ambitious 500 Days Programme and an early supporter of Russian economic reforms, he was soon sidelined by younger, more radical economists who sought even further reforms than Shatalin.

== Early life and career ==
Stanislav Sergeyevich Shatalin was born on 24 August 1934, in the village of Detskoye Selo in the Russian Soviet Federative Socialist Republic's Leningrad Oblast. The village is today known as Pushkin, and forms a municipal town of the city of Saint Petersburg. He was born into a family of prominent communists; his father, Sergey Shatalin, would later become Second Secretary of the Party Committee of Kalinin Oblast, and his uncle, Nikolay Shatalin, became a member of the Central Committee of the Communist Party of the Soviet Union in 1953.

Stanislav began studying at the Moscow Power Engineering Institute following his graduation, but transferred two years later to the Faculty of Economics at Moscow State University. There, he was taught by Leonid Kantorovich, who would later be awarded the Nobel Memorial Prize in Economic Sciences, and he graduated in 1958 with a specialisation in political economics. Following his graduation, Shatalin worked at the USSR Gosplan Economic Institute, quickly moving from a junior researcher to director of one of the institute's sectors. He defended his Candidate of Sciences dissertation in 1964, and four years later was among a team of economists awarded the USSR State Prize.

== Academy of Sciences of the Soviet Union ==
Beginning in 1965, Shatalin was employed at the Central Economic Mathematical Institute, under the Academy of Sciences of the Soviet Union. This was followed by him becoming a corresponding member of the Academy of Sciences of the Soviet Union in 1974, and eventually an academic of the academy in 1987. Shatalin also worked at All-Union Scientific Research Institute of Systemic Sciences, or VNIISI, (now the Institute of Systemic Analysis of the Russian Academy of Sciences) from 1976 to 1986, studying socioeconomic topics and the role of state planning on social development. Though his research was seen as problematic by the Soviet government, it did not stop his rise to the status of academic in 1987.

== 500 Days Programme ==
By 1990, the Soviet economy was in crisis, following the Era of Stagnation and Perestroika. Productivity had severely declined, and shortages became widespread. As a result, Soviet leader Mikhail Gorbachev sought the advice of Shatalin and several other liberal economists to devise an economic plan. The end result was what would later become known as the 500 Days Programme. Despite opposition from government voices such as Nikolai Ryzhkov, Shatalin's programme was adopted in September 1990, leading The New York Times to later remark that "Mr. Shatalin became famous almost overnight" as a result of the reforms.

Shatalin's economic plan was regarded as radical for its time; it called for rapid privatisation, economic decentralisation, and privatisation, eventually envisioning the Soviet Union's reformation into more of an economic union than a political union. The programme called for 70% of Soviet industry and an even larger percentage of agriculture to be privatised, as well as the privatisation of the service and commerce sectors effectively in entirety. It also argued that workers should be given the right to salary negotiation, unprofitable businesses closed, and the complete abolition of price controls.

The response from conservatives was largely negative; Shatalin was accused of being an opponent of Marxism–Leninism, and (eventually successful) efforts were made by party hardliners to end the programme. Among his opponents was Mykola Azarov, later Prime Minister of Ukraine, who would claim in 2015 that he was told "Young man, don't you see you're talking to cattle? They need to be told very primitive things so that they swallow them and support us, otherwise we will not have any perestroika and we will not break this idiotic system..." Shatalin supported his position by arguing that,

An essentially anti-popular policy was pursued for a long period: a rich state with a poor people. The state concentrated in its hands enormous resources, virtually the entire ownership of means of production. Resources were spent thoughtlessly on gigantic and inefficient projects, on building up military might and on foreign policy adventures with an ideological underpinning, although all this has long been beyond our means.

— Shatalin, Man, Freedom, and the Market, Izvestia, 4 September 1990

Following Gorbachev's cancellation of the 500 Days Programme, Shatalin experienced a reversal in fortune, being removed from the economic council he served on. After these events, he became an outspoken opponent of the Soviet government, including protesting against the 1991 deployment of Soviet troops to Lithuania. He also co-founded the Russian Democratic Reform Movement in 1991.

== Later career and death ==
Following the dissolution of the Soviet Union, Shatalin's advice was once again pursued by the leadership of Russia. This time, Russian leader Boris Yeltsin, who had previously supported the 500 Days Programme, sought to enact some of his reforms. However, Shatalin was politically sidelined by younger and more radical co-authors of the 500 Days Programme, such as Grigory Yavlinsky, who supported measures like shock therapy. As Russia's economy declined under Yeltsin, Shatalin expressed opposition to his rule. In response, he was attacked by Yegor Gaidar, Russian Prime Minister and a former student of Shatalin.

Shatalin made an effort to maintain political relevance in later years, mulling a campaign in the 1996 Russian presidential election and founding the "My Fatherland" movement alongside colonel general Boris Gromov and singer Joseph Kobzon.

Shatalin died on 3 March 1997 from undisclosed causes. At the time of his death, which was revealed by the Russian Academy of Sciences, he was 62 years old, and he had previously spent several years in and out of hospitals, going back to before the 500 Days Programme.
