= Default (finance) =

Financial failure to meet legal conditions of a loan

In finance, default is failure to meet the legal obligations (or conditions) of a loan, for example when a home buyer fails to make a mortgage payment, or when a corporation or government fails to pay a bond which has reached maturity. A national or sovereign default is the failure or refusal of a government to repay its national debt.

The biggest private default in history is Lehman Brothers, with over $600 billion when it filed for bankruptcy in 2008 (equivalent to over $880 billion in 2025). The biggest sovereign default is Greece, with $138 billion in March 2012 (equivalent to $202 billion in 2025).

== Distinction from insolvency, illiquidity and bankruptcy ==
The term "default" should be distinguished from the terms "insolvency", illiquidity and "bankruptcy":

- Default: Debtors have been passed behind the payment deadline on a debt whose payment was due.
- Illiquidity: Debtors have insufficient cash (or other "liquefiable" assets) to pay debts.
- Insolvency: A legal term meaning debtors are unable to pay their debts.
- Bankruptcy: A legal finding that imposes court supervision over the financial affairs of those who are insolvent or in default.

== Types ==
Default can be of two types: debt services default and technical default. Debt service default occurs when the borrower has not made a scheduled payment of interest or principal. Technical default occurs when an affirmative or a negative covenant is violated.

Affirmative covenants are clauses in debt contracts that require firms to maintain certain levels of capital or financial ratios. The most commonly violated restrictions in affirmative covenants are tangible net worth, working capital/short term liquidity, and debt service coverage.

Negative covenants are clauses in debt contracts that limit or prohibit corporate actions (e.g. sale of assets, payment of dividends) that could impair the position of creditors. Negative covenants may be continuous or incurrence-based. Violations of negative covenants are rare compared to violations of affirmative covenants.

With most debt (including corporate debt, mortgages and bank loans) a covenant is included in the debt contract which states that the total amount owed becomes immediately payable on the first instance of a default of payment. Generally, if the debtor defaults on any debt to the lender, a cross default covenant in the debt contract states that that particular debt is also in default.

In corporate finance, upon an uncured default, the holders of the debt will usually initiate proceedings (file a petition of involuntary bankruptcy) to foreclose on any collateral securing the debt. Even if the debt is not secured by collateral, debt holders may still sue for bankruptcy, to ensure that the corporation's assets are used to repay the debt.

There are several financial models for analyzing default risk, such as the Jarrow-Turnbull model, Edward Altman's Z-score model, or the structural model of default by Robert C. Merton (Black–Scholes Merton Model).

=== Sovereign defaults ===
Sovereign borrowers such as nation-states generally are not subject to bankruptcy courts in their own jurisdiction, and thus may be able to default without legal consequences. One example is Greece, which defaulted on an IMF loan in 2015. In such cases, the defaulting country and the creditor are more likely to renegotiate the interest rate, length of the loan, or the principal payments. In the 1998 Russian financial crisis, Russia defaulted on its internal debt (GKOs), but did not default on its external Eurobonds. As part of the Argentine economic crisis in 2002, Argentina defaulted on $1 billion of debt owed to the World Bank.

=== Orderly default ===
In times of acute insolvency crises, it can be advisable for regulators and lenders to preemptively engineer the methodic restructuring of a nation's public debt—also called "orderly default" or "controlled default". Experts who favor this approach to solve a national debt crisis typically argue that a delay in organising an orderly default would wind up hurting lenders and neighboring countries even more.

=== Strategic default ===
When a debtor chooses to default on a loan, despite being able to service it (make payments), this is said to be a strategic default. This is most commonly done for nonrecourse loans, where the creditor cannot make other claims on the debtor; a common example is a situation of negative equity on a mortgage loan in common law jurisdictions such as the United States, which is in general non-recourse. In this latter case, default is colloquially called "jingle mail"—the debtor stops making payments and mails the keys to the creditor, generally a bank.

=== Sovereign strategic default ===
Sovereign borrowers such as nation-states can also choose to default on a loan, even if they are capable of making the payments. In 2008, Ecuador's president Rafael Correa strategically defaulted on a national debt interest payment, stating that he considered the debt "immoral and illegitimate".

== Consumer default ==
Consumer default frequently occurs in rent or mortgage payments, consumer credit, or utility payments. A European Union wide analysis identified certain risk groups, such as single households, being unemployed (even after correcting for the significant impact of having a low income), being young (especially being younger than around 50 years old, with somewhat different results for the New Member States, where the elderly were more often at risk as well), being unable to rely on social networks, etc. Even internet illiteracy has been associated with increased default, potentially caused by these households being less likely to find their way to the social benefits they are often entitled to. While effective non-legal debt counseling is usually the preferred -more economic and less disruptive- option, consumer default can end-up in legal debt settlement or consumer bankruptcy procedures, the last ranging from one-year procedures in the UK to six-year procedures in Germany.

Research in the United States has found that pre-purchase counseling can significantly reduce the rate of defaults.

== Bibliography ==
- de Servigny, Arnaud; Olivier Renault (2004). The Standard & Poor's Guide to Measuring and Managing Credit Risk. McGraw-Hill. ISBN 0-07-141755-9.
- Duffie, Darrell; Kenneth J. Singleton (2003). Credit Risk: Pricing, Measurement, and Management. Princeton University Press. ISBN 0-691-09046-7.
- Firzli, M. Nicolas J. (2010). Greece and the Roots the EU Debt Crisis. The Vienna Review. ISBN 978-0-7910-2939-8.
- Lando, David (2004). Credit Risk Modeling: Theory and Applications. Princeton University Press. ISBN 0-691-08929-9.
