= James Cook (American banker) =

American investor, banker, and financier

James Bernard Cook
- Education: Hampden–Sydney College; Virginia Tech Pamplin College of Business
- Occupation: Banker

James Cook is an American investor, banker, and financier. He served as managing partner of The U.S. Russia Investment Fund (TUSRIF) and Delta Capital Management and chairman and CEO of GE Capital in Russia. He was the co-founder of Aurora Russia Limited, AIM-listed private equity firm active in Russia. He was instrumental in turning around Russia's financial system after the 1998 Russian financial crisis, when he launched the first mortgage bank in Russia and became known as the "father of mortgage lending" in Russia. He later introduced the first revolving credit card in Russia and launched a nationwide leasing company in Russia. Recently, he was a major fundraiser for Hillary Clinton's 2016 presidential campaign.

== Early life ==
James Cook grew up in Richmond, Virginia. He graduated from Hampden–Sydney College, and he earned a Bachelor of Science degree in finance from the Virginia Tech Pamplin College of Business. He also graduated from the Mortgage Bankers Association's School of Mortgage Banking.

== Career ==
Cook worked in marketing for the Virginia Tech Credit Union while he was in college. He subsequently worked as a loan officer for the Investors Savings Bank in Richmond. By 1988, he joined the Virginia Housing Development Authority as a compliance officer.

Cook went to work as deputy director of the Urban Institute in Russia in 1994, where he was tasked with teaching Russian bankers about mortgages. He began working for Delta Capital Management in 1996, only to be promoted as its senior vice president in 2000. Meanwhile, by 1999, he also served as the senior vice president of The U.S. Russia Investment Fund (TUSRIF), an investment fund managed by Delta Capital.

Cook offered his first mortgage at the Delta Capital Management in 1997. As most Russians had never taken loans before, Cook and other bankers turned to ex-KGB officers to do background checks for them.

Cook was appointed as the chairman and chief executive officer of GE Consumer Finance, a Russia-based subsidiary of General Electric, in 2004. He also served on the boards of directors of OSG, Unistream, Fora Bank, Kreditmart, DeltaBank, DeltaCredit, Europlan, Flexinvest Bank, and the ICICI Bank in Russia.

Cook co-founded Aurora Russia Limited, a private equity firm, in 2006. The firm attracted $150 million, and it was listed on the Alternative Investment Market, a submarket of the London Stock Exchange, until 2016. Meanwhile, the two men created three businesses with the fund, including KreditMart, a mortgage and consumer loan firm.

Cook believes that the 1998 Russian financial crisis "was the best thing that could have happened" to Russian banks, as it taught them to diversify their assets. He is known as the "father of mortgage lending" in Russia.

== Political activity ==
On October 4, 2015, Cook hosted a fundraiser for Hillary Clinton's presidential campaign at his Paris residence.
