= 500 Days Program =

1990 Soviet economic plan

The 500 Days Program (Russian: программа "500 дней") was a shock therapy program to overcome the economic crisis in the Soviet Union by means of a transition to a market economy. Intended to comprehensively change the Soviet Union in a span of two years, it was ultimately a factor leading to the Soviet Union's collapse.

== History ==
The program was proposed by a group of economists including Stanislav Shatalin, Grigory Yavlinsky and Yevgeny Yasin. According to authors, the Soviet Union needed "to be built anew, nor reformed." The 500 Days Program was proposed to implement a form of economic shock therapy which proposed to transform the Soviet Union comprehensively in less than two years.

The program was further developed by a work group under the direction of Stanislav Shatalin (an economic advisor to Mikhail Gorbachev). Before beginning work on the project, Shatalin had been assured by Gorbachev that he was serious about radically reforming the Soviet economy.

Therefore, in August 1990, the group issued a 400-page report titled "Transition to the Market". It was based on the earlier "400 Days Project" prepared by Yavlinsky and became known colloquially as the "500 Days Program" as it intended to create the groundwork for a modern market economy in 500 days. The report called for creation of a competitive market economy, mass privatization, prices determined by the market, integration with the world economic system, a large transfer of power from the Union government to the Republics, and many other radical reforms.

The 500 Days Program immediately gained the complete support of Boris Yeltsin and a more skeptical support from Mikhail Gorbachev; soon after, Nikolai Ryzhkov, the Chairman of the Council of Ministers, openly repudiated it.

Ultimately, this shock therapy plan was a contributing factor to the collapse of the USSR.

== Authors ==
- Stanislav Sergeyovich Shatalin, Станислав Сергеевич Шаталин
- Nikolai Yakovlevich Petrakov, Николай Яковлевич Петраков
- Grigory Alekseyovich Yavlinsky, Григорий Алексеевич Явлинский
- Sergey Vladimirovich Aleksashenko, Сергей Владимирович Алексашенко
- Andrey Petrovich Vavilov, Андрей Петрович Вавилов
- Leonid Markovich Grigoryev, Леонид Маркович Григорьев
- Mikhail Mikhailovich Zadornov, Михаил Михайлович Задорнов
- Vladlen Arkadyevich Martynov, Владлен Аркадьевич Мартынов
- Vladimir Mashchits, Владимир Мащиц
- Aleksey Yuryevich Mikhailov Алексей Юрьевич Михайлов
- Boris Grigorevich Fyodorov, Борис Григорьевич Фёдоров
- Tatyana Vladimirovna Yarygina, Татьяна Владимировна Ярыгина
- Yevgeniy Grigorevich Yasin, Евгений Григорьевич Ясин

== See also ==
- Uskoreniye
- Perestroika
- Glasnost
- History of the Soviet Union (1982–1991)
- Five-year plans of the Soviet Union
- Dissolution of the Soviet Union
- Propaganda in the Soviet Union
- 1998 Russian financial crisis
- 1991 Soviet coup d'état attempt
- 1993 Russian constitutional crisis
- State collapse
- Russian Soviet Federative Socialist Republic
- Economic transition
- Grigory Yavlinsky
