= Matthew Rojansky =

American national security expert

- Education: Harvard University (BA); Stanford Law School (JD)
- Organization: U.S. Russia Foundation for Economic Advancement and the Rule of Law (USRF)
- Title: President & CEO

Matthew Rojansky is an American academic, lawyer, and national security policy scholar. As of January 2022, he is President & CEO of the U.S. Russia Foundation for Economic Advancement and the Rule of Law (USRF), an American non-profit organization founded in 2008 that aims to strengthen relations between the United States and Russia and to promote the development of the private sector in the Russian Federation. He is an adjunct professor at Johns Hopkins School of Advanced International Studies. He served as a director of the U.S.-Russia Foundation and founded the Carnegie Endowment for International Peace's Ukraine Program. From July 2013 to January 2022, Rojansky was the director of the Kennan Institute at the Woodrow Wilson International Center for Scholars, which focuses on Russia and Ukraine issues.

== Early life and education ==
Rojansky received a Bachelor of Arts in history from Harvard University and a Juris Doctor from Stanford Law School.

== Career ==
Rojansky served as a clerk for Judge Charles E. Erdmann on the United States Court of Appeals for the Armed Forces.

From 2007 to 2010, Rojansky was the executive director of Partnership for a Secure America, a nonprofit focused on seeking bipartisan solutions to national security challenges. He served as deputy director of the Russia and Eurasia Program at the Carnegie Endowment for International Peace. Rojansky was the director of the Kennan Institute at the Woodrow Wilson International Center for Scholars, which focuses on Russia and Ukraine issues.

=== Consideration for National Security Council ===
In April 2021, Axios reported that President Joe Biden was considering appointing Rojansky as the Russia director on the National Security Council. Axios noted that while Rojansky was widely respected as a Russia scholar, a 2018 letter by 31 alumni of the Kennan Institute criticized the think tank's "growing pro-Kremlin policies, lack of democratic procedures and unprofessional communication with Kennan Institute alumni in Ukraine". A week later, Rojansky was withdrawn from consideration, with senior officials voicing concerns that his appointment would be seen as a concession to Russia.

== Views ==
Rojansky has argued that Russian interference in the 2016 election is more plausibly explained by Putin wanting to "send the message to Americans that... American democracy is just as vulnerable to foreign meddling" rather than "specifically picking sides."

Rojansky believes that Russia and China are inherently distrustful of each other, but that American policy is driving them to be natural partners.

He has written numerous articles on U.S. policy in regard to Russia and Ukraine. He wrote in support of U.S. president Joe Biden's approach.
