= Grigory Yavlinsky =

Russian politician and economist (born 1952)

- Григорий Явлинский
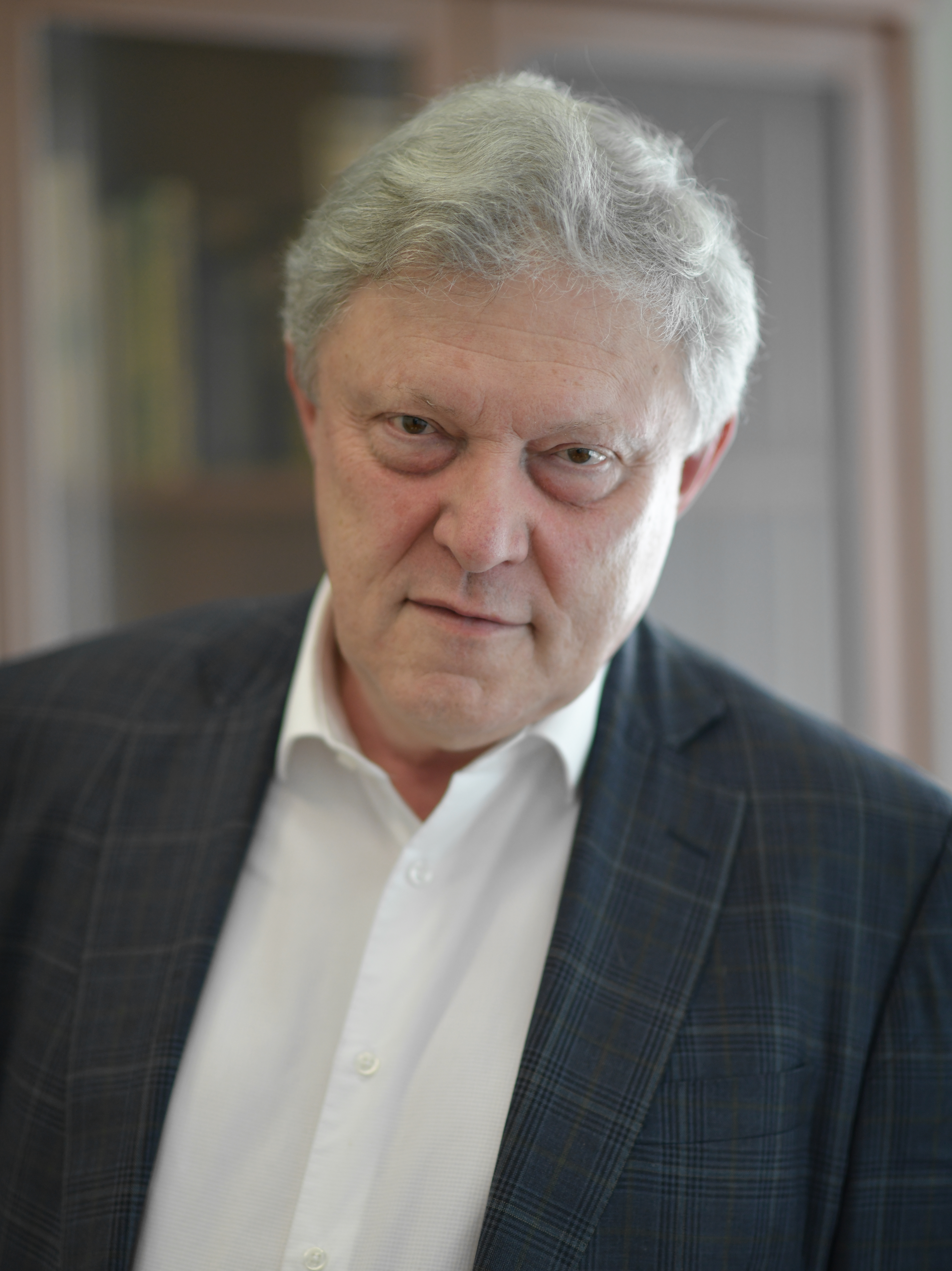
- Yavlinsky in 2023

Leader of Yabloko
- In office 1993–2008
- Preceded by: Office established
- Succeeded by: Sergey Mitrokhin

Member of the State Duma
- In office 11 January 1994 – 19 December 2003

Deputy Premier of the Soviet Union as Deputy Chair of the Economic Operational Management Committee
- In office 24 August 1991 – 25 December 1991 Serving with Yury Luzhkov and Arkady Volsky
- Premier: Ivan Silayev
- Preceded by: Office established
- Succeeded by: Office abolished

Deputy Premier of the Russian SFSR
- In office 14 June 1990 – 22 November 1990 Serving with others
- Premier: Ivan Silayev

Personal details
- Born: 10 April 1952 (age 74) Lviv, Ukrainian SSR, Soviet Union (now Ukraine)
- Party: Yabloko
- Spouse: Elena Yavlinskaya (b. 1951)
- Children: Mikhail (b. 1971); Aleksey (b. 1981)
- Website: http://yavlinsky.ru/
- Grigory Yavlinsky's voice Recorded 25 January 2007

Grigory Alekseyevich Yavlinsky (Russian: Григорий Алексеевич Явлинский; born 10 April 1952) is a Russian economist and politician. He has held numerous positions in the Soviet and Russian governments across different levels, including in the State Duma.

Yavlinsky was one of authors of the 500 Days Program, a plan for the transition of the Soviet regime to a free-market economy, and is the former leader of the opposition Yabloko party. He has run three times for Russia's presidency. In 1996 he ran against Boris Yeltsin, finishing fourth with 7.3% of the vote. In 2000 Yavlinsky ran against Vladimir Putin, finishing third with 5.8%. In the 2012 presidential election he was prevented from running for president by Russian authorities, despite collecting the necessary 2 million signatures of Russian citizens for his candidacy. Yavlinsky was Yabloko's candidate for Russian President in the 2018 presidential election, when he ran against Putin and got 1.05% of the vote, according to the results. Many of the election results were not recognised by his party due to corroborated allegations of irregularities.

Yavlinsky holds a PhD in economics from the Central Economic Mathematical Institute of the Russian Academy of Sciences; his doctoral dissertation was entitled "The socio-economic system of Russia and the problem of its modernisation". He is a professor at the National Research University Higher School of Economics.

== Early life and career ==
Yavlinsky was born in Lviv, Ukrainian SSR. His father, Aleksei Yavlinsky, was an officer, and his mother, Vera Naumovna, a chemistry teacher at an institute. Both his parents are buried in Lviv, while his brother Mikhail still lives there. He is related to Natan Yavlinsky, the nuclear physicist who invented the tokamak.

In 1967 and 1968, he was the champion of the Ukrainian SSR in junior boxing. He decided to become an economist during his school years. From 1967 to 1976, he studied at the Plekhanov Institute of the National Economy in Moscow as a labour economist and took a post-graduate course there. While a candidate of economics, he worked in the coal sector. After finishing his postgraduate studies he was employed by the All-Soviet Union Coal Mines Department Research Institute. His job was to draft new unified work instructions for the coal industry. He was the first person in the USSR to complete this assignment. To perform his duties, he had to go down the mines. One of his shifts nearly ended tragically for him when the mine collapsed. Together with four workers, he spent ten hours waist-deep in ice-cold water, waiting for help. Three of his fellow sufferers died in hospital after their rescue. Yavlinsky spent four years at this job. He saw it as an opportunity to see the world hidden behind the propaganda posters. He reported about the horrible conditions in which the coal miners lived and worked, but his reports had no impact.

In 1980, Yavlinsky was assigned to the USSR State Committee for Labour and Social Affairs in charge of the heavy industry sector. In this position he began to develop a project aimed at improving the USSR labour system. He identified two different ways to enhance the efficiency of the system: either establish total control over every move of every worker in the country or alternatively give enterprises more independence. His report on the project did not prove popular with the head of the State Committee for Labour, Yury Batalin. The KGB confiscated 600 draft copies of Yavlinsky's report and interrogated him several times. When Brezhnev died in 1982, the KGB finally left Yavlinsky alone. However, he had to stop working as he was diagnosed with tuberculosis and sent to a closed medical facility for nine months. The drafts of his report were burned together with his other personal belongings as contagious.

From 1984, he held a management position at the Labour Ministry and then at the Council of Ministers of the USSR. In this capacity, he had to join Communist Party of the Soviet Union, of which he was a member in 1985–1991. He was head of the Joint Economic Department of the Government of the USSR. In 1989, he was made department head of the Statement Commission for Economic Reforms run by Academician Leonid Abalkin.

== Deputy Premiership and economic reforms (1990–1992) ==
Yavlinsky's commitment to a market economy was established in 1990 when he wrote 500 Days – a programme for the Soviet Union in which he proposed the rapid transition from a centrally planned economy to a free market economy in less than two years. To implement the programme, Yavlinsky was appointed Deputy Chairman of the Council of Ministers of the RSFSR and Deputy Chairman of the State Commission for Economic Reform. President of the USSR Mikhail Gorbachev decided to combine Yavlinsky's programme with another one which had been developed simultaneously. The other programme, "The Main Directives for Development", had been created by the Chairman of the Council of Ministers Nikolai Ryzhkov, who threatened to resign if his project was rejected. In October 1990, when it became clear that his programme would not be implemented, Yavlinsky resigned from the government. He then established his own think tank, EPICenter, which brought together many members of his 500 Days team who were to become his future associates in Yabloko (Sergei Ivanenko, Aleksei Melnikov, Aleksei Mikhailov, etc.).

In the summer of 1991, while working in Harvard, he co-authored a new reform programme jointly with Graham Allison, which offered a platform for Gorbachev's negotiations with the G7 over financial aid in support of a transition to a market economy. After the defeat of the hardline August 1991 coup against Gorbachev and Yeltsin, he was appointed Deputy Chairman of the Committee for Management of the National Economy which operated in place of Soviet government. Holding the rank of Deputy Prime Minister, he was responsible for organizing the work to prepare the country's economic reform program. President of the RSFSR Boris Yeltsin asked Yavlinsky to return to the government of the republic and even considered making him Prime Minister. In this role Yavlinsky successfully negotiated an economic union among Soviet republics. The agreement was signed by representatives of twelve republics in Alma-Ata on 18 October 1991. However, when Yeltsin signed the Belavezh Accords, which led to the breakup of the Soviet Union and the rupture of all political and economic connections between the former Soviet republics, Yavlinsky left again as a sign of protest against Yeltsin's actions. A year later, Yavlinsky started his own political career.

When the "shock therapy" reforms were launched by Yeltsin and Yegor Gaidar in January 1992, Yavlinsky became an outspoken critic of these policies, emphasising the differences between his programme and Gaidar's reform programme (such as the sequencing of privatisation versus the liberalisation of prices and the applicability of his program to the entire Soviet Union):

"Certainly, they have no program. They have some elements of policy . . . and they are very contradictory".

In 1992, Yavlinsky served as advisor to Boris Nemtsov who was at the time the Governor of Nizhny Novgorod Region. Yavlinsky developed a regional economic reform programme for Nemtsov. Later, however, their paths diverged, as Nemtsov sided with Yeltsin's government on most issues, eventually becoming deputy prime minister and one of the founders and leaders of the Union of Right Forces, while Yavlinsky became the leader of the liberal opposition to Yeltsin.

== Activities during the Yeltsin administration (1993–2000) ==
In 1993, as the conflict intensified between Yeltsin and the parliament over the shock therapy programme, Yavlinsky had high ratings in the polls as a potential presidential candidate and the image of an independent, centrist politician, untainted by corruption. In September–October 1993, he joined a group of senior politicians who tried to mediate between Yeltsin and the parliament. However, after the outbreak of hostilities on the streets of Moscow on 3 October, he unequivocally called on Yeltsin to use force against militants on the streets and other armed supporters of the parliament.

When Yeltsin set the date for the elections to the new parliament and a constitutional referendum for 12 December 1993, Yavlinsky had to cobble together an electoral bloc in haste, as he had no party of his own, and had to recruit existing parties as co-founders. His bloc was co-founded by three of them, the Republican Party of the Russian Federation, Social Democratic Party of Russia and Christian Democratic Party of Russia, all three tilting on most issues toward the Yeltsin camp.

The top three names on the slate – Yavlinsky, Yury Boldyrev (former State Controller and disaffected democrat) and Vladimir Lukin (at the time Russia's ambassador to the US) – gave the bloc its initial name, "Yavlinsky-Boldyrev-Lukin" with the initials Я, Б, Л (Ya, B, L), abbreviated as YABLOKO, which is also the Russian word for apple, hence the party logo. With no prior electoral experience, Yabloko succeeded in winning 7.9% of the vote in December 1993 and forming the fifth largest faction in the Duma. After Boldyrev clashed with Yavlinsky over a draft law on production-sharing agreements and left the bloc in 1995, the name was retained, but now reinterpreted as the "Yavlinsky Bloc". In 1995, the Yabloko caucus in the Duma set up its own political association which was reincorporated as a political party in 2001.

Yavlinsky meets people in 1997

One of the features distinguishing the party from other liberal parties was its critique of Yeltsin's policies, from the economic "shock therapy" and the handling of the 1993 Russian constitutional crisis to the First Chechen War and Russia's relations with the West. Yavlinsky established himself as a leader of the democratic opposition. In this capacity, he was a principled opponent of Gaidar's Russia's Choice and its successors in parliament, such as the Union of Right Forces. In turn, they accused him of being too inflexible and blamed his personality for the failure to merge with other democrats in order to mount a concentrated electoral challenge to the hardline forces. Others, however, admitted that there were philosophical differences between Yavlinsky's unspoken social democratic bent and the neoliberal orientation of his democratic opponents.

In September 1998, after the 1998 Russian financial crisis brought down Sergei Kirienko's government, Yavlinsky proposed the candidacy of Yevgeny Primakov who was elected Prime Minister in spite of resistance from Yeltsin, his family and entourage. This helped resolve the political stalemate and many credit Primakov with rescuing the economy from chaos and with the start of the recovery of the industrial production that continued under Vladimir Putin. However, Yavlinsky declined Primakov's offer to join his Communist-dominated government as deputy prime minister for social policies and soon joined the ranks of his critics on the liberal side. Later in 1999 Yavlinsky criticised Primakov as a throwback to the stagnation days of Soviet leader Leonid Brezhnev. Interfax quoted him saying on one occasion: "This Brezhnev style of government absolutely does not suit us". Yavlinsky said Primakov relied too much on communists and other leftists who do not understand modern economics. However, Yavlinsky warned Yeltsin against sacking the entire government, as he believed that this would have set up a showdown with the State Duma of the kind that had led Primakov to be appointed Prime Minister in the first place.

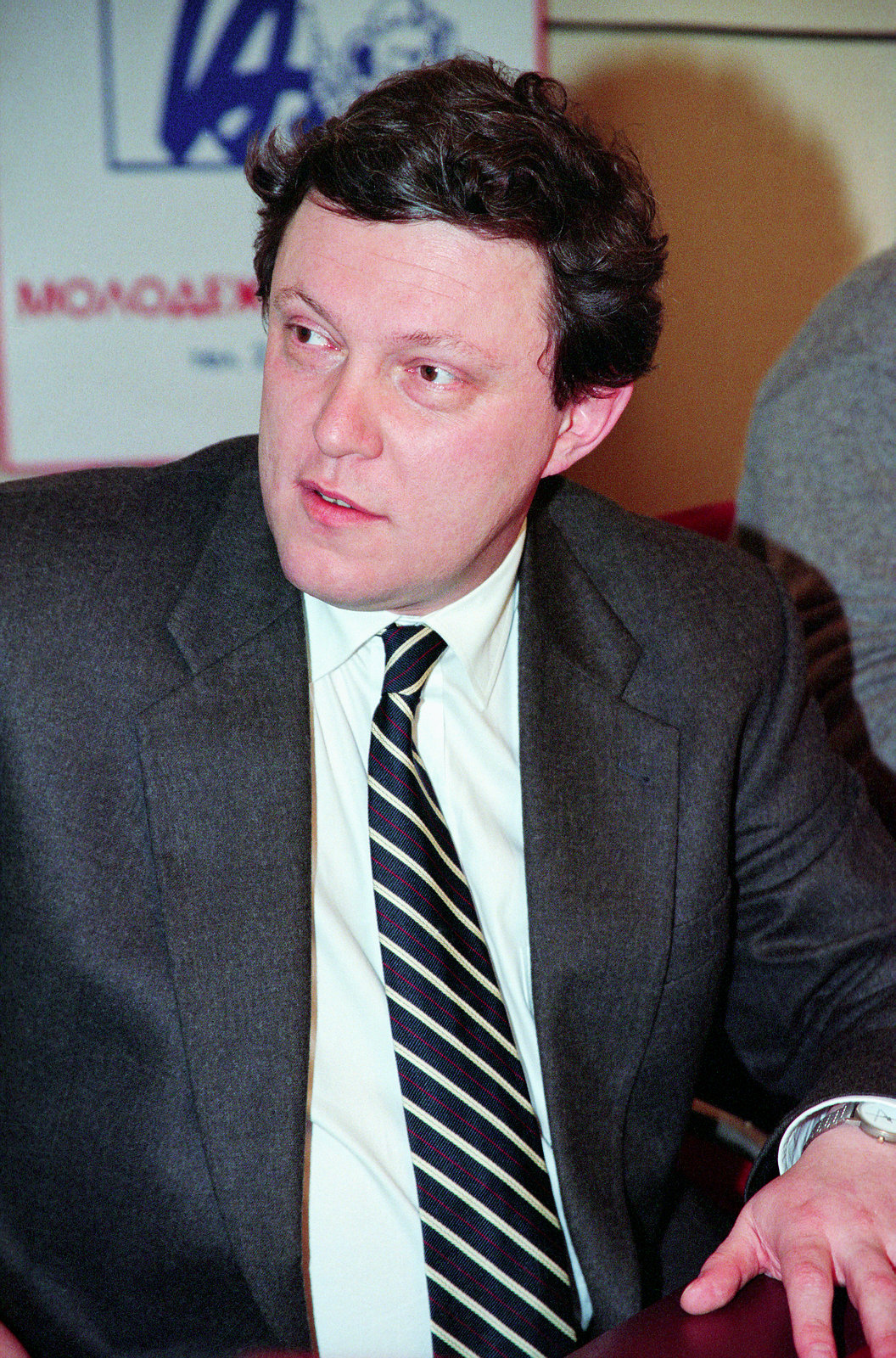
Yavlinsky in 1999

In May 1999, Yavlinsky joined forces with the Communist Party in an attempt to impeach Yeltsin. The news media had been full of speculation that if the Duma were to proceed with the impeachment, Yeltsin might retaliate by firing the communist-backed Cabinet of Prime Minister Yevgeny Primakov. This would have precipitated a political crisis and the possible dissolution of the Duma and threatened the political stability that Primakov has brought Russia since previous summer. Of the four charges of impeachment, the one accusing Yeltsin of abuse of power in connection with war in Chechnya garnered the most support from both parties. Yavlinsky said that this was a warning to all politicians that they would be judged for their actions. Just as the Communists began to nod their assent, Yavlinsky attacked them, dismissing the other charges as politically inspired. He said that Yeltsin had made serious mistakes, sometimes fateful, during the reforms, which had led to the bankruptcy of the country, not out of a desire to destroy Russia, but because he was unable to make a break with his past, and that he had not intended to destroy or liquidate anyone, and did not have such a conscious goal. In summary, Yavlinsky declared:

Such indifference and negligence is a long-time tradition of the Communist-Bolshevik leaders from whose midst he (Yeltsin) rose and with whom his entire biography is linked. The Communist regime headed by Stalin deliberately murdered tens of millions of citizens of various nationalities. The party which proclaims as its historical leaders and heroes Lenin and Stalin, the ideologists and organizers of massive crimes against humanity, assumes responsibility for these atrocities with cynical pride.

Although Yavlinsky's repeated statements that all the party's 46 State Duma deputies would vote unanimously in favour of the charge on the Chechen war, eight defected and sided with Yeltsin. The outcome was still 17 votes short of the two-thirds majority (300 votes) needed to start impeachment proceedings.

In 1996 and 2000, Yavlinsky ran for president with the backing of his party and other organizations. In 1996 presidential elections he came fourth and received 7.3% of the vote. In the 2000 presidential elections he finished third and received 5.8% of the vote. In both cases, he did not subsequently offer his support to either Yeltsin or Putin or their Communist opponent in both elections, Gennady Zyuganov.

Yavlinsky never concealed his lukewarm view of the breakup of the Soviet Union in 1991 which occurred while he was negotiating an economic treaty among the republics. However, he never advocated a restoration of the Soviet Union or a revision of post-Soviet borders.

Yavlinsky was at times critical of US policies toward Russia, particularly under the Clinton administration. Some of his most trenchant criticisms are contained in his lecture at the Nobel Institute delivered in May 2000.

== Activities under Putin's first and second administrations (2000–2008) ==
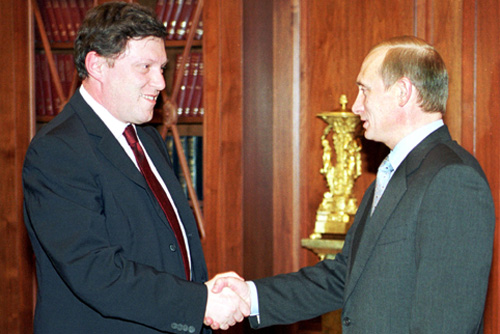
President Putin with Yavlinsky in 2000

Under the Putin presidency, Yavlinsky remained an active opponent of any military solution to the problems in Chechnya. In 2002, he took part in the negotiations with the Chechen terrorists during the Moscow theatre hostage crisis and was praised by President Vladimir Putin for his role in the standoff. His party also campaigned against imports of radioactive waste into Russia, thereby building a crucial alliance with environmental NGOs, as well as with human rights organisations, labour unions, women associations, and ethnic minority groups. He was also an uncompromising critic of the government reforms under Putin of the housing and utilities sector and the energy sector. On a number of occasions the Yabloko faction in the State Duma initiated petitioning campaigns for the resignation of the government.

Yavlinsky has had difficult relations with the authorities both under Yeltsin and under Putin. While supporting Putin's early foreign policies of developing closer ties to the United States, he remained critical of domestic policies, in particular the arrest of Mikhail Khodorkovsky in the fall of 2003. He became even more outspoken about the assault on democratic freedoms in Russia and insisted that Putin's policies represented a direct continuation of Yeltsin's policies.

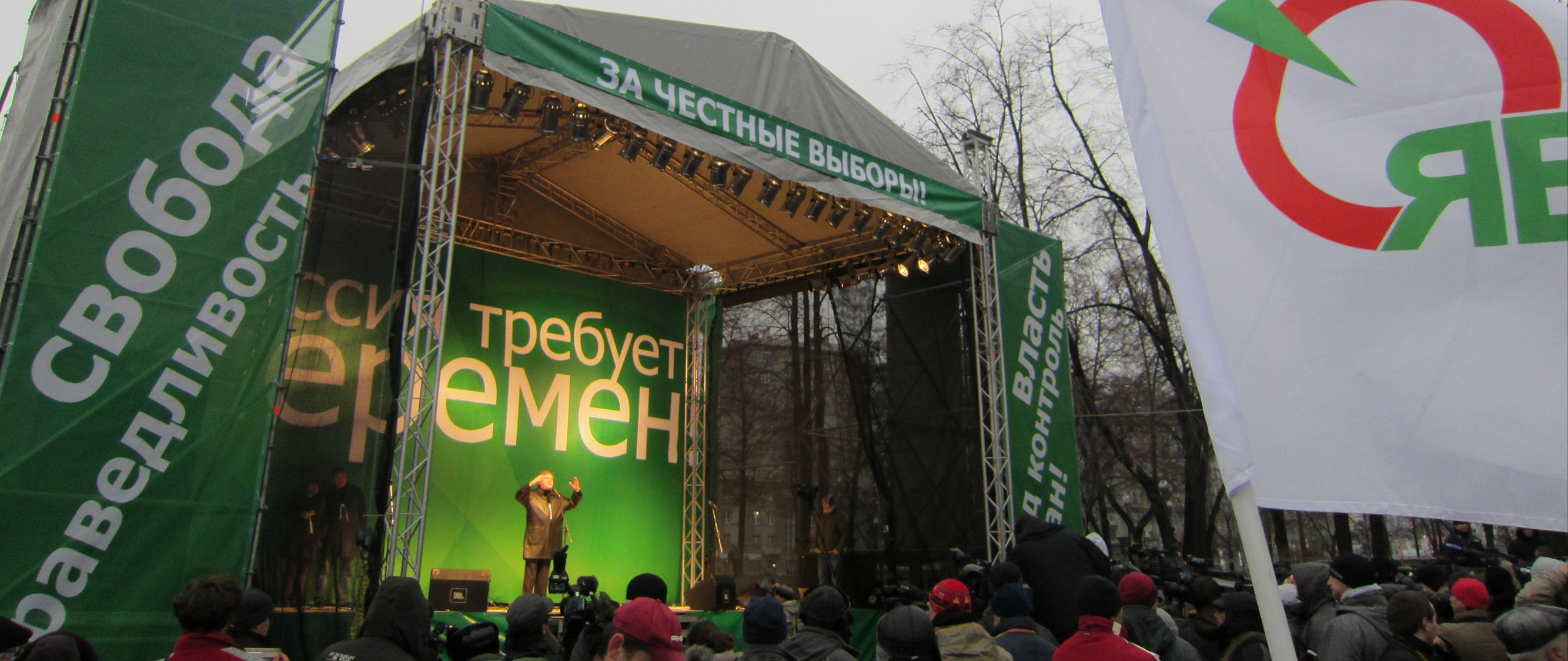
Grigory Yavlinsky at a rally in Bolotnaya Square, Moscow. 17 December 2011

In the 2003 elections to the Duma, Yabloko failed to cross the 5% threshold of Duma representation. Yavlinsky later recalled that Putin had telephoned him early on election night to congratulate him, apparently believing – or pretending to believe – that Yabloko had succeeded in gaining representation.

Yavlinsky refused to run for president in 2004, claiming that Putin had rigged the elections to the point of making them meaningless.

After the Yabloko Party failed again to secure representation in the 2007 Russian legislative election, there was some possibility that Yavlinsky might run again for presidency in 2008. However, Yabloko and Yavlinsky himself supported the longshot and largely symbolic candidacy of émigré dissident Vladimir Bukovsky who in the end failed to clear legal obstacles to his registration.

On 22 June 2008, Yavlinsky stepped down as party leader at Yabloko's 15th congress, proposing in his place the candidacy of Moscow City Duma deputy Sergey Mitrokhin who was elected as the new party chairman. Yavlinsky remained a member of Yabloko's Political Committee (elected there with the largest number of votes) and a regular spokesman for the party, particularly in local election campaigns.

== Post-financial crisis (2008–2011) ==
In an interview at HSE's conference Yavlinsky stated that common disease for all states in the late 20th century – early 21st century was the merger of the state with business. According to Yavlinsky, this is a key trigger of the economic crisis in the US. A fusion of Wall Street and the White House paralyzed all the possibilities of Barack Obama other than the injection of fresh money in the old economy. Such an approach has no future owing to the level of public debt and poor quality of the state in decision making, he told.

According to Yavlinsky, the 2008 financial crisis happened owing to the appearance of insurance-backed loans, which led to a dramatic increase in the number and volume of such loans. If a business goes insolvent, creditors are paid by the insurance. This created the impression that the loans were safe. However, the reliability of borrowers declined. When too many extremely unreliable loans were issued in the United States, at some point a number of borrowers went insolvent at the same time, making it impossible to pay the insurance, Yavlinsky wrote. As a result, no money was returned to the lenders. As a result, the biggest banks and investment companies went bankrupt. In simple terms, this is a gigantic "financial pyramid" (Ponzi scheme), he says.

Let's assume you borrow from someone, but things don't work out. However, you still need to pay them back and pay the interest. So you borrow from someone else paying them interest. To pay back, you borrow more, and so on and so on until it ends in failure. The enormous scale of the "financial pyramid" became possible because of extremely lax financial regulation of the government.

In his opinion, the crisis could have been resolved by bankrupting all the financiers and bankers responsible. However, as there were too many of them, and in many respects the economy was dependent on them, such an approach might engender even greater social problems. In addition, they are so integrated in the US power elites. Therefore, owing to fears of social unrest, the US government saved them by giving them funds financed by the taxpayers, in the end helping the parties that were actually responsible for the crisis. Applying this approach, the officials hoped that the economy would work and would start to grow after receiving a huge infusion. However, economic activity didn't grow despite the US$750 billion injected by the Bush administration and the US$800 billion invested by the Obama administration because of market distrust. In the book Realeconomik: The Hidden Cause of the Great Recession (and How to Avert the Next One), Yavlinsky makes the case that a stable global economy cannot be achieved without a commitment to established social principles in business and politics:

The title and subtitle reflect the central idea of the book: the cause of the crisis is that at the core, modern capitalism is concerned with money and power, not ideals, morals, or principles. The word Realeconomik is used as an analogue to Realpolitik, a pejorative term for politics that masquerades as practicality while in fact comprising the cynicism, coercion, and amorality of Machiavellian principles. An entire generation of Western politicians, businessmen, and economists has come of age without ever thinking seriously about the relationship between morality and economics or ethics and politics. I do not seek to make any moral judgments: I aim instead to be descriptive and analytical. My goal is to indicate those areas that are usually not discussed in public. I feel the urgency to state clearly the things that I believe to be crucial to understanding the events unfolding before our eyes. The nature of the Great Recession is not only economic, or perhaps not even attributable mainly to economic factors. Neither is it the product of mere complacency and negligence of duty on the part of authorities and top-level managers in the private sector, as some experts insist. Rather, the underlying fundamentals and causes go deeper – to such things as general rules of society and the logic to which they are subject, encompassing the issues of individual and social values, moral guidance, and public control, as well as their evolution over the past several decades. These issues are much more serious and have a greater impact on economic performance than is customarily believed.

Yavlinsky argues that the world of money should not be viewed as separate from culture and society: he believes that the financial crisis was merely a symptom of a wider moral collapse, and that it is time to examine how we live:

Even comparatively sophisticated ways of responding to this crisis, as proposed by many, such as writing new, stringent rules, exercising more public control over their enforcement, imposing taxes on some kinds of financial operations, and the like will not resolve fundamental problems, which are not simply economic. Far less will be achieved by simply "pouring money on the crisis," even if it is accompanied by exposing the banking secrets of thousands of officials and businessmen. There are no ready-made solutions to these problems. However, I hope Realeconomik will provide a fresh perspective for anyone concerned about another bursting bubble, persistently high unemployment, the "new normal" (economic stagnation in a low-growth, low-inflation environment), financial volatility, sharply rising poverty rates (even in industrialised nations such as the United States), and social unrest, or the possibility of something more catastrophic. It is difficult to talk about the economy from the perspective of morality, as the very concept of morality seems to be devoid of established content, is subject to broad interpretation, and is often rather elusive. But those difficulties seem insufficient reason to exclude morality from economic analysis and research. It is essential to treat the issue of morality seriously and extensively to provide a meaningful perspective for economic processes and their consequences, especially in the framework of long term analysis.

== Tenure as a regional legislator (2011–2016) ==
=== Mass protests and campaigns ===
In September 2011 Yavlinsky was appointed head of the electoral list of Yabloko Party for the State Duma elections of the sixth convocation by a resolution of the party's congress. According to the official results of the elections held on 4 December 2011, Yabloko failed to surmount the five per cent barrier and as a result was not accorded any seats in the Russian parliament. However, the party gained more votes than in previous elections (3.43%), thereby securing state financing. At the same time, Yabloko candidates were elected in three regions, including the Legislative Assembly of Saint Petersburg where the party won 12.5% of the votes and six mandates. Yavlinsky, who also headed the party list for these elections, agreed to head the Yabloko fraction in Saint Petersburg and received the mandate of a state deputy on 14 December 2011.

On 18 December 2011 Yavlinsky was nominated by the Yabloko Party congress as the party's candidate for the Russian presidential elections scheduled for 4 March 2012. On 18 January 2011 he submitted to the Central Electoral Commission of the Russian Federation the 2 million signatures in support of his candidacy required to participate in the elections. After checking the signatures, the commission claimed to have identified photocopies of signatures and refused to register Yavlinsky as a candidate, rejecting 25.66% of the submitted signatures on the grounds that they were defective.

On 8 February 2012 the Supreme Court of the Russian Federation rejected Yavlinsky's appeal against the decision of the Central Electoral Commission, finding the decision not to register his candidacy to be legal. Commenting on his disqualification, Yavlinsky declared that the decision was politically motivated.

Yavlinsky actively supported the protests in Russia in December 2011 – March 2012 against the falsifications during the elections and was a frequent speaker at the meetings "For Fair Elections" in Moscow. On 14 and 15 May he visited Saint Isaac's Square in Saint Petersburg where the opposition camp was located. He participated in the "March of Millions" in Moscow on 6 May and 12 June.

=== Legislation ===
At the elections of deputies of the Legislative Assembly of Saint Petersburg of the 5th convocation Yavlinsky was the only candidate in the municipal part of Yabloko's list and on this basis headed the party at the Saint Petersburg elections. According to official data, the party won 12.5% of the votes and formed a faction of six deputies in the city parliament. Throughout his term as a deputy (December 2011 to September 2016), Yavlinsky worked in Saint Petersburg several days a week, while continuing to live in Moscow. He participated in plenary sessions, committee sessions, would see constituents and address their concerns.

During his work at the legislative assembly Yavlinsky prepared the conceptual strategy "Greater Saint Petersburg. 21st Century", which combined economic, spatial and time-based approaches to the development of the entire metropolitan area of Saint Petersburg and Leningrad Region – Greater Saint Petersburg. It was submitted in February 2015 to the Governor of the city Georgy Poltavchenko. In April 2015 Yavlinsky outlined the key concepts of the document to representatives of the authorities and business of Saint Petersburg and Leningrad Region at the first strategic session held as part of preparations for the forum "Harmony of Versatility".

During the five years of work of the Yabloko fraction headed by Yavlinsky, Saint Petersburg's parliament adopted 25 per cent of the numerous initiatives proposed by Yabloko's deputies (almost 100 in total).

=== Opposition to the Russo-Ukrainian War ===
At the end of February 2014 Yavlinsky published in the Russian business daily Vedomosti an article with the heading "Russia is creating a zone of instability around its borders". He wrote that a social contract had existed in Ukraine until the end of autumn 2013: the people had been prepared to endure Yanukovych as long as they could see the country moving towards Europe. Yavlinsky notes in the article that on the eve of the signing of the EU Association Agreement, it became clear that the European option was not splitting the country: on the contrary, it was bringing people together. Notwithstanding all the serious Ukrainian internal drivers of the evolving crisis, it was primarily attributable to developments in Russia:

Russia's unnatural refusal to move along the European path implies a rift in the post-Soviet space. The Ukrainian crisis is the result of this rift. Instead of moving together with Ukraine towards Europe, Russia is trying to draw the country in the diametrically opposing direction. Through its renunciation of the European vector, Russia is creating a zone of instability, as virtually all its Western and even southern neighbours are in the final analysis striving for Europe. Accordingly, all these countries will have significant forces fighting Russia's plans to hold them back and not let them go. Sooner or later the instability caused by this erroneous anti-European course will also come to Russia itself.

On 16 March 2014, on the eve of the referendum in Crimea, Yavlinsky published an article in the independent Russian newspaper Novaya Gazeta entitled: "Peace, not war. How to achieve the former and prevent the latter". In the article, he wrote in particular:

The positions and actions of the powers-that-be in Russia in respect of Ukraine and in connection with developments there are a reckless political adventure.

We believe that it is absolutely unacceptable to even raise the idea of using Russian troops in Ukraine. This is the position held by Yabloko.

We also believe that the separation of Crimea from Ukraine and its annexation is an error at the national level.

The fundamental goal of such a policy implemented by the leadership of our country is clear. This is the positioning of Ukraine as a "failed state", which is popular among the entourage close to the powers that be. They tend to believe that it is in Russia's interests to push Ukraine into political degradation and territorial collapse, or to transform it into a puppet state.

We are convinced that it is in Russia's interests to make an immediate break with such ideology and to bring such policies to an end.

The immediate result of Crimea's annexation would be to transform Russia into a country with zero reputation and borders that are not recognised internationally.

In the same article Yavlinsky advocated the immediate convening of an International Conference on political, legal and military issues related to Ukraine, in particular, on a range of Crimean issues. In October 2014, the Federal Political Committee of the Yabloko Party on the initiative of Grigory Yavlinsky adopted a decision to assess developments in the Donbas, stating in particular:

The annexation of Crimea and transfer of Russian weapons to so-called "separatists", the sending of volunteers to them, propaganda and military support from Russia – all these factors can be defined as "warmongering".

On 13 December 2014 at a Yabloko Party meeting, Grigory Yavlinsky advocated the creation of a "buffer zone" between Russia and Ukraine, with the participation of international observers, negotiations with Ukraine's leadership, the removal of mercenaries and materiel from the country and the provision of guarantees to the public which should in the end lead to the holding of a "legitimate referendum" on the status of Crimea organised under Ukrainian law "so that this problem does not haunt Russia forever". "We need to say: Yes, Crimea is not our territory". At the same time, Yavlinsky stated that Crimea's future should be determined by the inhabitants of the peninsula on the basis of respective legislation: "We hold that the referendum on 16 March 2014 was illegal, conducted in a rush with utter disregard for any rules, laws and norms and under the "protection" of the Russian Armed Forces." "I want my country to have internationally recognised borders. I want people living in Crimea to be fully-fledged citizens of Europe. However, the key is that this issue should be resolved in such a way that Russia can say: We are a European country, we are building our future together with Europe on the same rules governing how hundreds of millions of people live". The politician proposed that a "legal and legitimate referendum (or local referenda with prospects of the cantonisation of Crimea)" be held based on Ukrainian legislation and international norms of law "agreed with Kyiv, the Crimean authorities, Russia, the EU, OBSE and the United Nations." Such a referendum conducted under stringent international control should contain three questions: whether the people want to live as part of Ukraine, as an independent Crimean state or as part of Russia.

Yavlinsky and Yabloko prioritised the topics of the war in Donbas and the annexation of Crimea during the party's election campaign for the State Duma of the 7th convocation in 2016. During the election campaign, on federal TV channels, Yavlinsky repeatedly criticised the Kremlin's policy in Ukraine and disclosed that Russian citizens were participating in the military actions in Ukraine.

In 2017 Yavlinsky developed a peace plan for Donbas consisting of 10 points. The plan provided guarantees for the long-term safety of the region's inhabitants and proposed an end to the war. It was one of the key policy documents of Yavlinsky's presidential campaign in 2018.

== 2016 parliamentary elections ==
A Yabloko Party congress held in July 2016 established the electoral list of the party's candidates for the elections to the State Duma of the 7th convocation. Based on the party's voting results, Yavlinsky was elected head of the federal list of the Yabloko Party.

Yavlinsky stated that the State Duma campaign should be perceived exclusively as part of preparations for the Russian presidential elections in 2018. On 23 April 2016 at a meeting of the Political Committee of the Yabloko Party, Yavlinsky declared that the expansion of the powers of the employees of the law enforcement authorities in the law "On the Police" and the creation of Rosgvardiya (National Guard of the Russian Federation) were actions adopted by the regime to prepare for the 2018 presidential elections, which will become the "bifurcation point":

The presidential elections – these represent possibly the last chance for peaceful regime change with no spilling of blood.

At the Yabloko Party congress in July 2016 Yavlinsky declared that society must establish a comprehensive alternative to Vladimir Putin at the impending presidential elections, and start fighting for this choice:

Without this step, it will not prove possible to change the regime in Russia peacefully and legally, and there is simply no other method.

Yabloko's election programme entitled "Respect for the Individual" stated:

This is a programme for the transition from a state of war to a state of peace, from the power of corruption to the power of law, from state lies to truth, from injustice to justice, from violence to dignity, from humiliation of the individual to respect for the individual.

Yabloko's experts drafted a package of more than 140 draft laws in 20 different sectors that they planned to submit to the State Duma if elected. The draft laws included the "Land-Home-Roads" programme developed by Yavlinsky and a set of laws to overcome the consequences of the criminal privatisation of the mid-1990s. In addition, Yavlinsky proposed his own Economic Manifesto to the regime: the economic programme prioritised the adoption of a clear and unambiguous decision in favour of economic development and growth as the goal of both economic and state policy.

Representing the party in election debates on federal TV channels and radio stations, Yavlinsky reiterated the need to settle the military conflict in Donbas and resolve the Crimean issue. He dubbed the Russo-Ukrainian War a crime and condemned the military operation in Syria as senseless. He noted that the Russian economy was being destroyed by politics, and that if this did not stop, Russia might soon end up as an underdeveloped country for good, inevitably leading to the country's collapse, given its size and borders with the most unstable regions.

According to the official results, Yabloko Party won 1.99% of the total votes (1,051,535 votes) in the State Duma elections. Immediately after they were announced, the party's leadership issued a statement rejecting the results and accusing the authorities of tampering with actual electoral turnout and falsifying the voting. The party declared:

The State Duma has for the first time in the new Russian history been formed by a minority of the country's population. Consequently, it does not represent Russian society and is not a body of popular representation. Tampering with the actual turnout, instances of mass compulsory voting, as well as direct falsification during the counting of the votes and drafting of the protocols, does not make it possible to declare the federal elections held on 18 September to be honest and legitimate.

Summarising the election results, Yavlinsky said that the importance of Yabloko's participation in these elections was to tell the truth: on the criminal nature of the war with Ukraine, the senselessness of the war in Syria, the need to rectify the Crimean problem, the depleted nature of the economic system and the dead end facing the country. Against this backdrop, the party had participated in the elections to create the requisite conditions for the peaceful transformation of the system. In the opinion of Yabloko's leader, this can only be achieved through the transparent and coherent demonstration that millions of people in Russia support such a position.

== 2018 presidential elections ==
In June 2015 the Yabloko Party declared that it was necessary to establish an alternative to Vladimir Putin as the only effective strategy of the democratic opposition and proposed Yavlinsky for this role three years before the presidential election.

The following is taken from the decision of the Federal Political Committee of Yabloko "On the Political Strategy of the Party to 2018":

The key is that this should not be "someone like Putin, but without corruption", not Putin 2.0, but instead a politician with different convictions, personal qualities, thinking and a modus operandi in politics that is diametrically opposed to Putin's approach since 2000 and to the system which begat him – since the time of the foundation of our Party at the start of the 1990s. Yavlinsky also personifies today a categorical rejection of aggression, annexation and war as a means to build a "Russian world" and the Russian authoritative-oligarchic political and economic system, which inevitably led to the current exclusively hazardous and dead-end political situation.

In summer 2017, as part of preparations for the presidential elections, Yabloko conducted a wide-ranging campaign for the withdrawal of Russian armed forces from Syria and the allocation of the freed-up resources in 2017 to deal with the country's internal needs. The renunciation of geopolitical adventures in favour of internal development became the key talking point of Yavlinsky's presidential programme. In a short period over 100,000 signatures were collected throughout Russia. The campaign entitled "Time to return home" also had a significant impact on the public mood. According to the opinion polls, during the campaign the number of advocates for the withdrawal of Russian forces from Syria increased to 50%.

The issue of terminating military actions in the East of Ukraine and determining Crimea's status dominated Yavlinsky's election campaign. In 2017 Yavlinsky developed a peace plan for the Donbas, consisting of 10 points. The plan included a guarantee of long-term safety for the inhabitants of the regime and an end to the war. This plan was one of the key policy documents of Yavlinsky's 2018 presidential campaign. Yavlinsky dedicated a special online project entitled "However, is Crimea our territory?" to the topic of determining Crimea's status, where he advocated, inter alia, convening an international conference and explained how to prevent a war between Russian and Ukraine.

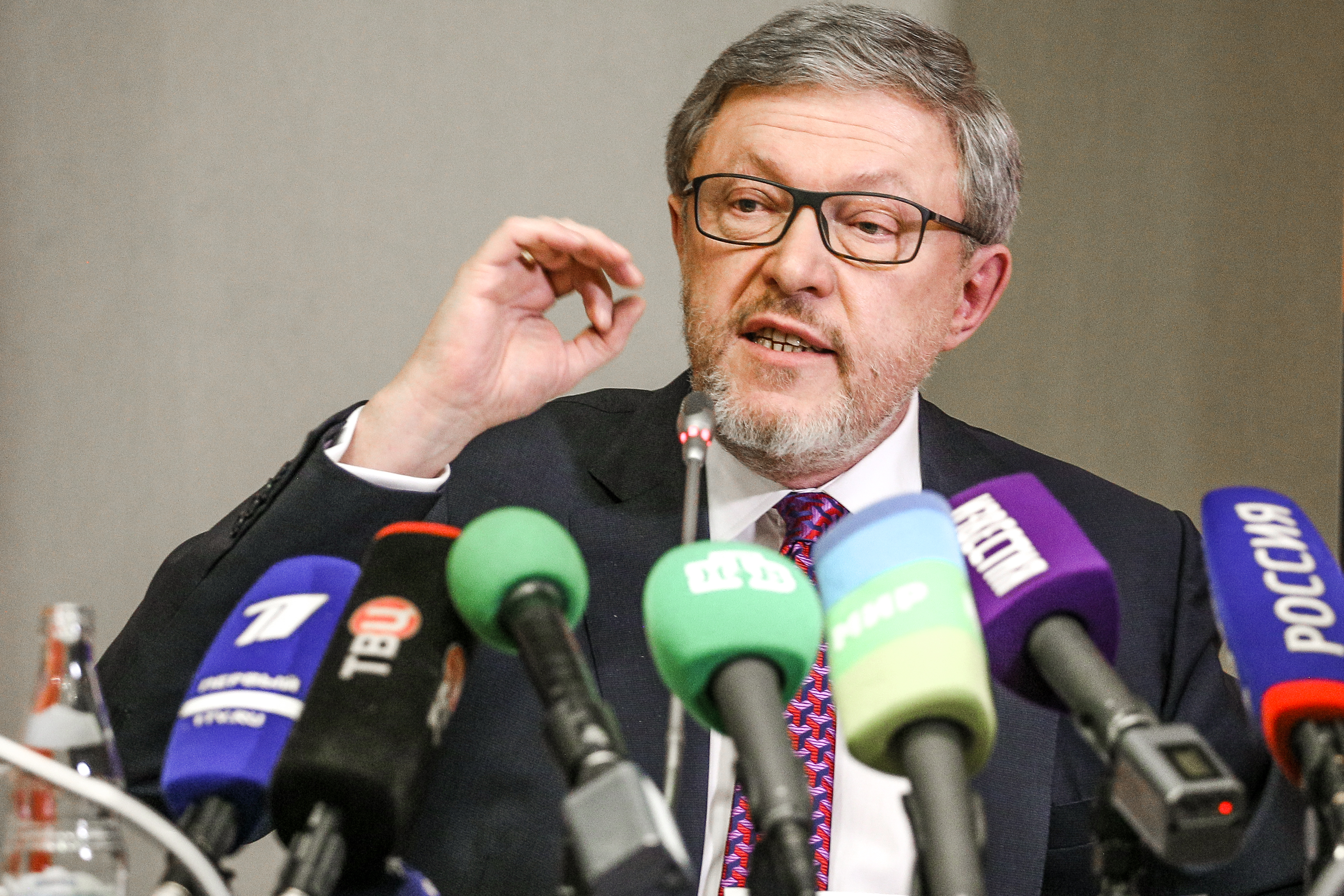
Yavlinsky in 2018

Other key positions of Yavlinsky's presidential campaign included the restoration of direct mayoral elections and the implementation of a new budget policy. He insisted on a change in the tax allocation structure to favour regions and municipalities, as well as a change in budget expenditure priorities – from the financing of the security, defence and law enforcement authorities and the state bureaucracy to social expenditure.

Yavlinsky cited the rise in poverty as a key indicator of the detrimental nature of Russia's politics. He held that reducing poverty and eliminating the excessive stratification of society was the priority objective that the new President of Russia would have to resolve. To achieve this goal, he proposed such measures as exempting the poorest population strata from tax, a one-time windfall tax on major earnings obtained based on the results of the fraudulent cash-for-share auctions conducted in the 1990s, the creation of personal accounts of Russian citizens that would be used for the transfer of revenues from the sale of natural resources, the implementation of the "Land-Homes-Roads" programme. Yavlinsky's programme also prioritised reforms of the judiciary, the inviolability of private property, the independence of the mass media and online freedom.

When participating in the presidential elections, Yavlinsky was aware that he would not defeat the current Head of State Vladimir Putin. He ran on the assumption that a high level of support for the candidate from the democratic opposition would lead to material adjustments to current policies.

A change in policy is vital. There is significant demand in our society for a ruthless dictator. If I am unable to show that different policies enjoy significant backing, then the former demand will be met. When a responsible leader is backed by 10 million people, when they speak the truth frankly and directly, the situation in the country and our life as well starts to change. Such a significant number of people cannot be ignored. The ideas and proposals of their candidate will have to be considered" (from an interview with the radio station Echo Moskvy on 12 January 2018)

Shortly before the start of the election campaign, Yavlinsky published an article in mid-December 2017 in Novaya Gazeta entitled "My Truth", where he wrote that the forthcoming "elections" were not elections, but rather the equivalent of an "electoral Halloween' and that in these circumstances, the reason for his participation was:

…to fight for truth against the backdrop of lies, Bolshevism and obscurantism, a fight against a real and dangerous political mafia which is leading my country to the precipice. The fight for truth is not comfortable and you have to pay. Formal humiliation over percentages, abuse, undue pressure, gossip from the political in-crowd – this is the price I am ready to pay.

On 22 December 2017 Yavlinsky was officially nominated as the Yabloko Party's candidate in the presidential elections. On 7 February 2018 he was officially registered by the Central Electoral Commission.

During the three-month campaign Yavlinsky travelled almost 40,000 kilometres, visited 20 cities and 16 Russian regions.

According to the official results announced on 18 March 2018, Yavlinsky won 1.05% of the votes and came fifth. However, the Yabloko Party stressed that the "voting results do not reflect the actual results of the elections", as the presidential elections had been transformed into a "plebiscite on support for the current president".

At the end of March 2018 Yavlinsky published an article in the Russian daily Nezavisimaya Gazeta entitled "The elections were won by a significant minority", in which he analysed the overall election campaign and its results and forecast developments in the country:

The politics of Vladimir Putin are destroying the economy and there are no premises for expecting any change. The Kremlin may appoint an inveterate liberal as a minister, "toning down" slightly the anti-West rhetoric and saying something about freedom. However, the key cause of domestic problems and external sanctions is not rhetoric, but instead the political and economic system and political policy which remains unchanged. That is why everyone lost the elections: both the participants, the people who called for a boycott, the people who simply didn't turn up to vote, the majority of people who voted for Putin, honest left wingers and national patriots. And they did not simply lose the elections – they lost any hope of a future. An absolute minority won, who piggyback on politics leading the country to a dangerous dead-end. This is the crux of these developments.

== Position on the 2020 coronavirus pandemic ==
In March 2020 Yavlinsky and the Yabloko Party developed and proposed for implementation an anti-crisis plan to combat the consequences of the pandemic, including an increase in healthcare expenses, compensation and subsidised assistance for individuals who were suffering and a whole range of benefits and alleviation of the tax burden on small and medium-size business which had missed out on revenue owing to COVID-19 related restrictions. Yavlinsky asserted that the state had sufficient funds to implement the anti-crisis plan – they could be taken from the National Welfare Fund and the country's foreign currency and gold reserves. However, such expenditure was not part of the Kremlin's plans. As the mass media reported, all the country's financial reserves were intended for a "rainy day", as confirmed by the events in Ukraine in 2022. The Russian government studied Yabloko's plan, but refused to implement it. In May 2020 in his article "After Lockdown" Yavlinsky stated that the Russian state would not invest in the economy, because Putin was preparing for confrontation with the West and had been setting aside all the resources deemed necessary to achieve this goal:

The state might, by making a serious effort, be able to extricate the economy from a post-lockdown torpor. However, Russia's regime is of poor quality and accordingly does not have any smart policies. Putin's regime will not invest the amount in the economy that is objectively required, as it considers the fight with the West to be its historical mission, and not the creation of a modern economy and an increase in the prosperity of its citizens. This is the crux of the Russian crisis and not COVID-19. The focus of the Russian establishment on the fight with the West is becoming dangerous for Russia and the world.

== Opposition to the 2020 constitutional amendments ==
On 15 January 2020 the Russian President Vladimir Putin, in his appeal to the Federal Assembly, declared that amendments should be introduced to the existing Constitution of the Russian Federation, including repudiation of international law in Russia, the consolidation of power in the hands of one individual – the President, as well as the lifting of restrictions on the terms of office of the President, which would enable the existing Head of State to hold this post until 2036. Yavlinsky castigated the proposed amendments — both in terms of their nature and the form used to introduce them – without any public debate, without alternative proposals and through the holding of an illegal referendum. On 21 January 2020 Yavlinsky announced the start of work on an alternative package of amendments to the Constitution, including the drafting and submission of fundamentally different amendments to the Constitution to the court of public opinion. This led to the foundation of the Public Constitutional Council, which included politicians, public figures and journalists. Leading experts on constitutional law in Russia were also involved. A package of amendments was prepared, which – unlike the ones proposed by Putin – were intended to strengthen the 1993 Constitution and "implement the idea of expanding the participation of individuals in the life of the state and create a system of authentic people power and the supremacy of the law." Yabloko Party deputies in regional legislative assemblies introduced alternative amendments for consideration by the State Duma.

A referendum on the introduction of amendments to the Constitution was held from 25 June to 1 July, in violation of all the legislative norms of the Russian Federation. According to the official results, over 78% of Russian citizens voted for Putin's amendments (on the eve of the referendum, according to the independent polling organisation Levada Center, the alternative package of the amendments drafted the Public Constitutional Council enjoyed the backing of 28% of Russians, while 25% of the respondents said that they supported Putin's amendments). Immediately after the voting, Yavlinsky declared that this was the ill-fated end of the era of post-Soviet modernisation and the start of the destruction of law for the country as a whole. In August Yavlinsky's work "The Day After. On the end of a lost era and the outlook for the future" was published, where he summarised the results of almost three decades of the abortive post-Soviet modernisation of Russia.

== Comments about Alexei Navalny (2021) ==
After the attempted assassination of Alexey Navalny and his subsequent arrest in Russia, Yavlinsky repeatedly called for an investigation into poisonings in Russia and the creation of an international investigative group.

On the eve of the street protests in support of Navalny, the Yabloko Party issued a statement on 22 January 2021 in which it demanded the release of all political prisoners in Russia – at the time over 300 people, including Alexey Navalny. The party also demanded that the federal and regional authorities show maximum restraint and refrain from violence against participations in peaceful political actions. Yabloko also called on the protest organisers and participants to display the maximum caution and responsibility:

The regime will use unlimited brutality and power against the participants in the protest. The protesters must understand the serious danger that they are exposing both themselves to and the people they are calling on to take to the streets. Calls for the participation of minors in unsanctioned protests are categorically inadmissible. Such calls are criminally irresponsible, whoever makes them.

After the first protests and mass detentions of participants in the protests, Navalny's headquarters declared on 4 February that subsequent protests might be held in spring 2021. Navalny's closest companion and one of the protest organisers Leonid Volkov admitted that he had called on people to take to the streets in order to attract the maximum possible public attention to the case against Navalny. Volkov declared: "At the time we had to cast everyone into the hearth. However, we had no other choice. We had to do this to consolidate public support prior to the decision of the court … And we achieved this goal at a high cost – …12,000 detainees." On 6 February 2021 Yavlinsky published the article: "No to Putinism and Populism" in which he analysed protest activism in Russia over the past ten years and also evaluated critically populist policies, holding that populism in politics poses a threat globally, including Russia:

Unleashing class populism in Russia, provoking confrontation between the rich and poor, will not lead to anything positive. The nationalist ploy of whipping up society for the sake of the battle against Putin was one of the drivers for spring 2014, with the annexation of Crimea and war in Ukraine.

Yavlinsky also roundly criticised Navalny's political line, calling it "populism and nationalism" – in particular, this concerned Navalny's participation in the nationalist "Russian Marches", his calls to bomb Tbilisi during the war with Georgia, and also his statements on the status of Crimea and the war in Donbas. In the article Yavlinsky warned against backing such a political line, noting that choosing between two evils never turns out well:

<...> today the new propagandists calling themselves members of the opposition, browbeat people tired with the immutability of the regime and corruption about Putinism. They consciously prompt them to choose the lesser of two evils, but do not say that the lesser evil, after conquering the bigger evil, always becomes even bigger than the original.

After the publication of the article "No to Putin and Populism", Navalny's supporters slammed Yavlinsky. One of the most common complaints was that Yavlinsky had criticised a prisoner. In response to the avalanche of criticism, Yavlinsky published an article on 11 February entitled "It is so simple to become executioners: Stay silent!", in which he explained why it was important at this particular moment in time to assess Navalny's politics:

This article is a conversation on what is happening right now, on the risks that are intensifying, on the future of our country and on what should be done to make Russia free, democratic and modern. Such a conversation is bound to affect Navalny who has been at the centre of public attention since August last year and has sought to be the leader, and not simply a politician. Accordingly, it goes without saying that his political position should be analysed and discussed.

<...>

Calling themselves the opposition, his activists keep repeating that the regime believes in its own propaganda and that this is its weak spot. However, now the same thing is also happening in the protest movement. People are starting to believe that Putin is shaking with fear after Navalny's films and that he was afraid of the return of his opponent from Berlin. Well, this is nonsense! Today, however, a lot of people are paying a high price for this fantasy. In this situation, a politician cannot stay silent for the sake of psychological comfort, tact or tactics.

Yavlinsky also noted that the ultimate goal of Navalny's political plan was to organise the next "smart voting" campaign for the State Duma elections in autumn 2021. Yavlinsky termed this strategy a "stupid and dangerous artifice":

Since 2011, including thanks to Navalny's artifice, calling on the electorate "to vote for anyone, but United Russia", we have a Duma supporting unanimously Putin's foreign policy adventures and desecration of the Constitution, rubber-stamping repressive laws and whipping up hysteria in the search for internal enemies and foreign agents. And what will happen now? Navalny's team will continue promoting this folly while we must "tactfully" stay silent, because Navalny has ended up in a prison colony? No, it doesn't work like that: in a country that is rapidly becoming impoverished, the danger of national socialism is increasing, while the support of the Mironov-Prilepin party and the Liberal Democratic Party of Russia is the path leading directly to fascism.

During the election campaign for the State Duma elections in autumn 2021 Navalny's supporters conducted a wide-ranging campaign in support of "smart voting", advocating that people vote, inter alia, for communists and representatives of the Mironov-Prilepin bloc. Such mass media as Echo Moskvy and the TV channel Rain also signed up to this campaign. As a result, the number of representatives of the Communist Party increased in the State Duma of the 8th convocation. Yavlinsky noted: "The Communists have established a foothold as the ideological prop of the regime and will push even more state policy towards war …". Meanwhile, during the election campaign, Yavlinsky and the Yabloko Party called on the electorate to vote against the war, but this call was not heard. According to official data, 1.34% of the electorate voted for Yabloko. Yavlinsky believes that this happened in part owing to widespread involvement in the smart voting strategy:

When President Putin effectively declared war against Ukraine last summer (2021) in his article – doctrine on the "historical past", while the Minister of Defence was put at the top of the United Russia list, the propagandists-supporters of "smart voting" did not want to understand that this also represented a declaration of the regime on its intentions to start a war. At the time, the thoughts and imagination of many "opinion leaders" were preoccupied by the instructions that they had been issued on who to vote for, meaningless electoral calculations, and fantasy thinking on how "smart voting" would help the prisoner Navalny. Yabloko's calls on people to oppose the war, in other words, not to vote for candidates from the parties benefiting from "smart voting", which are the parties of war together with United Russia, were unfortunately not heard. And now in February 2022 our country is actually on the verge of war, which will, if it happens, become a major misfortune for Ukraine and a lethal national disaster for Russia (G. Yavlinsky "With Putin and Populism". 10 February 2022)

== 2021 parliamentary elections ==
On 12 July 2021 Russian President Vladimir Putin published an article entitled "On the Historical Unity of Russians and Ukrainians". In his article Putin threatened Ukraine and the entire Western world with war. On 19 July Yavlinsky published his reaction to Putin's doctrine. In the article "On the Historical Future of Russia and Ukraine", he castigated this position and warned against the existential threat of such a conflict for Russia and the whole world.

<...> this article was a warning. Even though it was addressed not so much to us as to a notional version of the West, it was published on the eve of what we call elections in our country, and this makes Russian citizens its active recipients to a material extent. Russia's citizens will have an opportunity to express their views on the policy proclaimed by the President. We can vote "for": for Russia's right to a significant proportion of the territories of neighbouring Ukraine, for a plan to strip Ukraine of its sovereignty and statehood, and accordingly for the opportunity to wage war with Ukraine at any moment in time. This means voting for United Russia, the Communist Party of Russia, the Liberal Democratic of Russia and A Just Russia – Patriots for Truth. However, we can also vote against such a policy – for peace, the prospects of mutual understanding with the European Union, for equal and amicable relations with Ukraine and Belarus. And this means voting for Yabloko. (G. Yavlinsky. "On the Historical Future of Russia and Ukraine". 19 July 2021).

Yavlinsky did not stand in the elections to the State Duma of the 8th convocation. Instead, he participated proactively in the election campaign of the Yabloko Party, met with voters, called on people to vote for the party and its representatives in numerous election interviews. In his speeches Yavlinsky spoke constantly about the threat of war with Ukraine, stressing that at this time only this issue determined Russia's future. Voting in the State Duma elections in autumn 2021 was in his opinion a plebiscite on people's attitudes to war. Yabloko was the only political party to speak out against the impending war with Ukraine in these elections. However, the anti-war calls of Yavlinsky and Yabloko were not supported in the opposition mass media and protest movement in Russia, which deployed a large-scale campaign in support of "smart voting", calling on the electorate to vote for the Communists and other advocate of repressions, national policy and the war with Ukraine.

According to official data, 1.34% of the electorate voted at the State Duma elections in September 2021 for the Yabloko Party. Five months after the elections, the State Duma of the 8th convocation voted unanimously for the ratification of friendship treaties between the Russian Federation and districts of East Ukraine which declared its sovereignty unilaterally (the Donetsk People's Republic and the Lugansk People's Republic). Two days later Russia launched its invasion of Ukraine.

After the elections, which resulted in an increase in the number of Communist deputies in the State Duma, Yavlinsky stated that the supporters and advocates of Smart Voting would be responsible for any future actions of the State Duma deputies supported by Smart Voting. He also stated that the Russian regime perceived the widespread voting for Communists as a signal on the admissibility of intensifying repressions and on the need to consolidate Russia's imperialist policy. The Kremlin also interpreted the refusal of society to support the anti-war calls of Yabloko to mean to all intents and purposes support for a policy of war.

== On the invasion of Ukraine (2022–26) ==
On 24 January 2022, when the situation on the border with Ukraine deteriorated, Yavlinsky and the Yabloko Party published a statement, warning that "in the case of Russia the war will have irreversible destructive consequences", while "the political outcome will be the collapse of the Russian state and national disaster." On 27 January Yavlinsky presented an action plan to Russia's leadership, which would prevent military confrontation with Ukraine and the West, and proposed that the Yabloko Party act as the mediator in an international negotiating process as preparations for direct negotiations between the Russian and Ukrainian Presidents Vladimir Putin and Volodymyr Zelenskyy.

On 24 February 2022, after the launch of the Russian invasion into Ukraine, the Federal Political Committee of the Yabloko Party published the following statement signed by Yavlinsky:

Yabloko expresses its categorical protest against the military actions against Ukraine. This war is a war being waged by Russia against the objective march of history, a war against time, and a tragic disconnect from the reality of the modern world.

The consequences of this war will be with us for a long time. Today, however, we are talking first and foremost about a tragedy, the sufferings and destruction of people, something that can never be corrected. The tragedy is due to the lies, brutality and absolute indifference of the Russian regime to people.

The Yabloko Party believes the war with Ukraine to be the gravest crime.

We believe that this war is contrary to Russia's national interests and destroys Russia's future.

Yavlinsky and Yabloko also offer all the capabilities, resources and knowledge of the party for the practical creation of a special humanitarian corridor for the exchange of prisoners and the dead in Ukraine. The Party sent corresponding appeals to the Russian and international structures, inter alia, to the International Committee of the Red Cross.

In public speeches, Yavlinsky has been calling for an immediate ceasefire agreement, the exchange of prisoners and the bodies of the dead and the start of peaceful negotiations between Russia and Ukraine, and has offered to participate in person in negotiations on the exchange of prisoners and the bodies of the dead.

On 4 February 2023 Novaya Gazeta published an article by Grigory Yavlinsky on the front page of its weekly issue entitled "Just Stop!" where he called for a cease fire in the fighting between Russia and Ukraine. The article was translated into English on 9 February 2023 and published in the American magazine The Nation, entitled Stop the Killing:

A cease-fire agreement is not a treaty; it is not about peace, and not even about a truce or large-scale dialogue. It is a political demand aimed at saving lives. That's the main thing today.

A cease-fire agreement is the very first step toward a settlement. As long as there is fighting and people are dying, no attempts at discussion or negotiation are meaningful. Therefore, under the circumstances, a cease-fire agreement is required to make way for any positive development.

A cease fire is a political demand, the realization of which depends entirely on the willingness and understanding of the people making the decisions.

Previously, another American weekly Newsweek issued on 7 February 2023 a similar review of Yavlinsky's article in its material Putin Opponent Calls for Ukraine Ceasefire to Stop Bloodshed. The article was accompanied by quotes from an interview with Yavlinsky in the publication:

The situation is such that it would have never any kind of end because there is no possibility for any victory from both sides, so it's endless. Ukraine has achieved a lot and paid the price for that already, and now it's such a situation that the continuation of the war can destroy all this because the devastation would be enormous.

In Yavlinsky's opinion, such an agreement could only be concluded if it had the backing of the leadership of Russia, Ukraine, the US, the European Union and NATO. On 1 July 2023 Grigory Yavlinsky publicised seven key talking points on a cease fire in Ukraine. Live on the YouTube channel Zhivoy Gvozd, Yavlinsky commented in detail on each point and called on the media and others to start working on informing the public that a cease-fire agreement must be concluded as the only possible path to peace:

It is vital that the cease-fire proposal enjoy the broadest possible public support. That is why we must constantly talk about this issue and try to persuade people to come round to this point of view.

<...>

In the case of both Russia and Ukraine, the existence of these countries in the 21st century is contingent on a ceasefire enacted as soon as possible, for the issue today is whether these people will have a future. This is a fundamental security issue for all of Europe, and possibly for the world as a whole.

The seven talking points were published on Grigory Yavlinsky's official website and disseminated in social networks. The talking points were also translated into English and posted on the politician's English-language website.

In October 2023 Yavlinsky had urged Vladimir Putin to consider a cease-fire in Ukraine; after the US 2024 elections he lauded Donald Trump’s announcements about wanting to end the war.

Some observers considered Yavlinsky to be a likely presidential candidate in 2024, considering him to be the only remaining noteworthy politician opposed to the war with Ukraine to have neither been killed nor imprisoned. Yavlinsky ultimately declined to participate in the election in late December 2023.

In the 2026 Russian legislative election, Yavlinsky's party is the only one to be opposed to the invasion.

== Personal life ==
Yavlinsky met his wife, Yelena, while studying at the Plekhanov Institute, and the couple have two children. Their son Mikhail was born in 1971 and currently works for the BBC Russian Service in London. Their other son, Aleksey, was born in 1981 and works as a computer programmer in Moscow.

A 2011 interview revealed that political opponents of Yavlinsky's had his 23-year-old piano-playing son kidnapped in 1994, and his fingers cut off and mailed to him. He declined to reveal who was behind the attack and their demands, but said he "did everything to ensure the safety of his children".

== Books ==
- Transition to a Market Economy (500 Days Program) St. Martin's Press, New York, 1991)
- G. Yavlinsky. Economics and Politics in Russia: Diagnosis. Harvard, 1992.
- Laissez-Faire versus Policy-Led Transformation (lesson of the Economic Reforms in Russia) EPIcenter-NikaPrint, 1994
- The Inefficiency of Laissez-Faire in Russia: Hysteresis Effects and the Need for Policy-Led Transformation Journal of Comparative Economics. Volume 19, N 1. 1994. G. Yavlinsky and S. Braguinsky.
- G. Yavlinsky. An Uncertain Prognosis // Journal of Democracy, Vol. 8, No. 1, January 1997, pp. 3–11.
- Russia's Phony Capitalism // Foreign Affairs, 1998. Vol. 77, No. 3.
- Braguinsky S., Yavlinsky G. Incentives and Institutions: The Transition to a Market Economy in Russia. Princeton University Press, 2000, 280 pp.
- G. A. Yavlinsky. Ten years after the Soviet breakup – Going backwards // Journal of Democracy, 2001. Vol. 12, No. 4, p. 79–86.
- G. A. Yavlinsky. Peripheral Capitalism Review By Lilia Shevtsova; 159 pages, Moscow: Integral-Inform, 2003
- G. A. Yavlinsky. Realeconomik. The Hidden Cause of the Great Recession (And How to Avert the Next One) / Пер. с рус.: A. W. Bouis. L., New Haven: Yale University Press, 2011.
- G. A. Yavlinsky, A.Kosmynin. Peripheral Authoritarianism What Russia Has Achieved and Why.
- G. A. Yavlinsky, A.Kosmynin. Notes on History and Politics: the People, the Country, and the Reforms.

== See also ==
- 1995 Russian legislative election
- 1999 Russian legislative election
- 2003 Russian legislative election

Party political offices
New political party	Chairman of the Yabloko; 1993–2008	Succeeded by Sergey Mitrokhin
New political party	Yabloko presidential candidate 1996, 2000, 2018	Succeeded by Don't participate in 2004 and 2008 presidential elections
