= U.S. Russia Foundation =

American non-profit organization

- Founded: 2008
- Purpose: Russia-United States relations
- Location: Washington, DC, United States
- Origins: 32nd G8 summit
- Region served: United States, Russia
- Key people: John Beyrle (Chairman); Matthew Rojansky (President & CEO)
- Website: usrf.us

The U.S. Russia Foundation (USRF) is an American non-profit organization founded in 2008 that aims to strengthen relations between the United States and Russia and to promote the development of the private sector in the Russian Federation. While initially established with its headquarters in Moscow, the organization attracted negative attention from the Russian government and relocated to Washington, D.C. in 2015.

== Leadership ==
The President and Chief Executive Officer of USRF is Matthew Rojansky, who joined in 2022. Rojansky was previously Director of the Wilson Center's Kennan Institute and Deputy Director of the Russia and Eurasia Program at the Carnegie Endowment for International Peace.

Past presidents of USRF include Celeste Wallander (2017–2022) and Mark Pomar (2008–2017). Ambassador John Beyrle serves as Chairman of the Board of Directors (2018–present). Previous chairmen include Ambassador James Collins (2008–2018) and Steve Pease (2008-2018).

== History ==
=== Predecessor: U.S. Russia Investment Fund (1995-2008) ===
USRF is the legacy organization of the U.S. Russia Investment Fund (TUSRIF), which was established by the United States government in 1995 pursuant to the Support for East European Democracy Act (SEED) of 1989. It was the result of the merger of two funds established in 1993-1994: the $340-million Russian American Enterprise Fund (RAEF) and the $100-million Fund for Large Enterprises (FLEER). Most of the money came from the United States Agency for International Development (USAID).

Its main goal was to promote investments in Russia. It specialized in "early venture, mid venture, and growth capital investments in middle market companies", with a focus on the "media, retail, consumer goods, financial services, information technology, and telecommunication sectors". TUSRIF and Kohlberg Kravis Roberts & Company owned 51% of the Imperial Porcelain Factory until 1999, when it was nationalized by the Government of Russia.

In 2000, it established DeltaBank, the first bank to sell Visa credit cards in Russia. In October 2000, it became a majority shareholder of the European Bank for Reconstruction and Development. Meanwhile, they acquired JPMorgan Chase's banking license in 2000 and established DeltaCredit, the first bank to sell residential mortgages in Russia, in 2001.

By 2005, TUSRIF had invested $300 million in 44 Russian companies, including the aforementioned DeltaBank and DeltaCredit as well as two television networks. However, DeltaCredit was acquired by the Société Générale for $100 million that year. Meanwhile, TUSRIF also invested in small businesses, for example in Nizhny Novgorod.

TUSRIF was replaced by the U.S. Russia Foundation (USRF) in 2008. Three years later, in 2011, the disposal of $150 million from the fund was tabled by the United States Agency for International Development (USAID) and the United States Congress, on the recommendation from the Obama administration that half should go to the United States Department of the Treasury and half to support American values in Russia. By 2012, the Obama administration asked Congress to allocate only $50 million to support human rights non-profit organizations in Russia.

=== U.S. Russia Foundation (since 2008) ===
The establishment of the U.S. Russia Foundation was announced by presidents George W. Bush and Vladimir Putin at the 32nd G8 summit in 2006. It was an outgrowth of The U.S. Russia Investment Fund. It was registered in the United States in 2008 and in Russia in 2009. From 2009 to 2015, USRF operated a Moscow office. USRF supported numerous projects in Russia by being a co-funder together with Russian institutions.

Beginning in 2013, USRF along with other Western organizations came under increasing attack by anti-Western Russian organizations and media. By 2015, its CEO, Mark Pomar, was denied entry into Russia. Meanwhile, the organization was declared "undesirable" by the 2015 Russian undesirable organizations law. Indeed, the Office of the Prosecutor General of Russia, chaired by Yury Chaika, suggested it posed "a threat to the foundations of the constitutional system of the Russian Federation and the state's security." The United States Department of State (USDS) responded by saying, "We reject the contention that the Foundation's activities constitute a threat to Russia's security. On the contrary, this designation is another deliberate step to further isolate the Russian people from the rest of the world." After the closure of USRF headquarters in Moscow, the Foundation relocated to Washington, D.C. in 2015.
