= NF-kappa-B-activating protein =

Protein-coding gene in the species Homo sapiens

NKAP

Identifiers
- Aliases: NKAP, NFKB activating protein, MRXSHD
- External IDs: OMIM: 300766; MGI: 1914300; GeneCards: NKAP

Gene location (Human)
Chr.	X chromosome (human)
Band	Xq24	Start	119,920,672 bp
Band	Xq24	End	119,943,751 bp

Gene location (Mouse)
Chr.	X chromosome (mouse)
Band	X|X A3.3	Start	36,390,448 bp
Band	X|X A3.3	End	36,414,399 bp
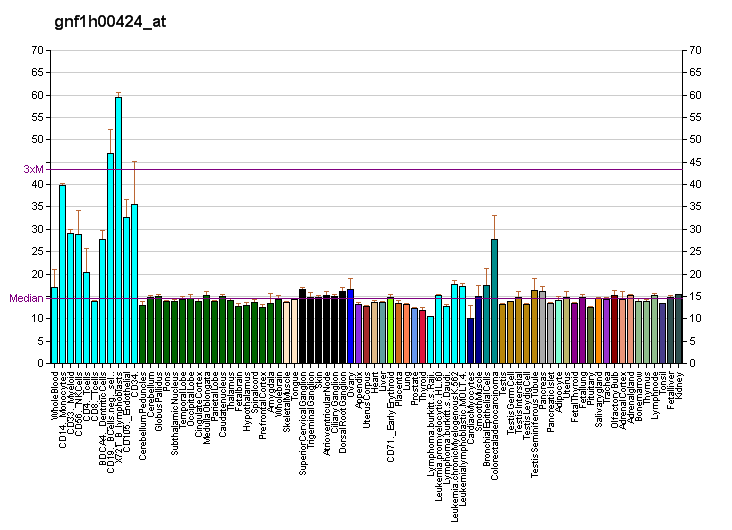
RNA expression pattern
Bgee	Human / Mouse (ortholog); Top expressed in: Achilles tendon; sural nerve; gonad; monocyte; buccal mucosa cell; gastrocnemius muscle; C1 segment; muscle of thigh; right adrenal cortex; left adrenal gland / Top expressed in: aortic valve; otic placode; ascending aorta; fossa; otic vesicle; substantia nigra; external carotid artery; internal carotid artery; condyle; supraoptic nucleus; More reference expression data
BioGPS	More reference expression data
Gene ontology
Molecular function	chromatin DNA binding; protein binding; RNA binding; chromatin binding
Cellular component	nucleus; nucleoplasm; cytosol
Biological process	Notch signaling pathway; stem cell population maintenance; hematopoietic stem cell proliferation; hemopoiesis; granulocyte differentiation; negative regulation of transcription by RNA polymerase II; T cell differentiation in thymus; positive regulation of alpha-beta T cell differentiation; regulation of transcription, DNA-templated; transcription, DNA-templated; positive regulation of protein targeting to mitochondrion; negative regulation of transcription, DNA-templated
Sources:Amigo / QuickGO
Orthologs
Databases	NCBI: entry; OMA: entry
Species	Human	Mouse
Entrez	79576	67050
Ensembl	ENSG00000101882	ENSMUSG00000016409
UniProt	Q8N5F7	Q9D0F4
RefSeq (mRNA)	NM_024528	NM_025937
RefSeq (protein)	NP_078804	NP_080213
Location (UCSC)	Chr X: 119.92 – 119.94 Mb	Chr X: 36.39 – 36.41 Mb
PubMed search
- Wikidata
View/Edit Human	View/Edit Mouse

NF-kappa-B-activating protein is a protein that in humans is encoded by the NKAP gene. NKAP is a nuclear protein that is essential for T cell maturation. NKAP physically associates with histone deacetylase 3 (HDAC3). NKAP has also been identified as an RNA-binding protein that localizes to nuclear speckles and associates with RNA-binding and splicing factors, with evidence supporting a role in pre-mRNA splicing and RNA processing. NKAP is also required for normal hematopoiesis and the maintenance of hematopoietic progenitor cells; loss of NKAP can induce cellular senescence or cell death. The interaction between NKAP and HDAC3 is required for hematopoietic stem cell maintenance and survival. Pathogenic variants in NKAP have been associated with an X-linked neurodevelopmental disorder, Hackmann–Di Donato syndrome. NKAP variants have additionally been associated with congenital heart defects, with the p.Arg330Cys variant reported to alter NKAP nuclear localization and impair its interaction with HDAC3.
