= 1998 Russian financial crisis =

Mid-1998 economic crisis in Russia

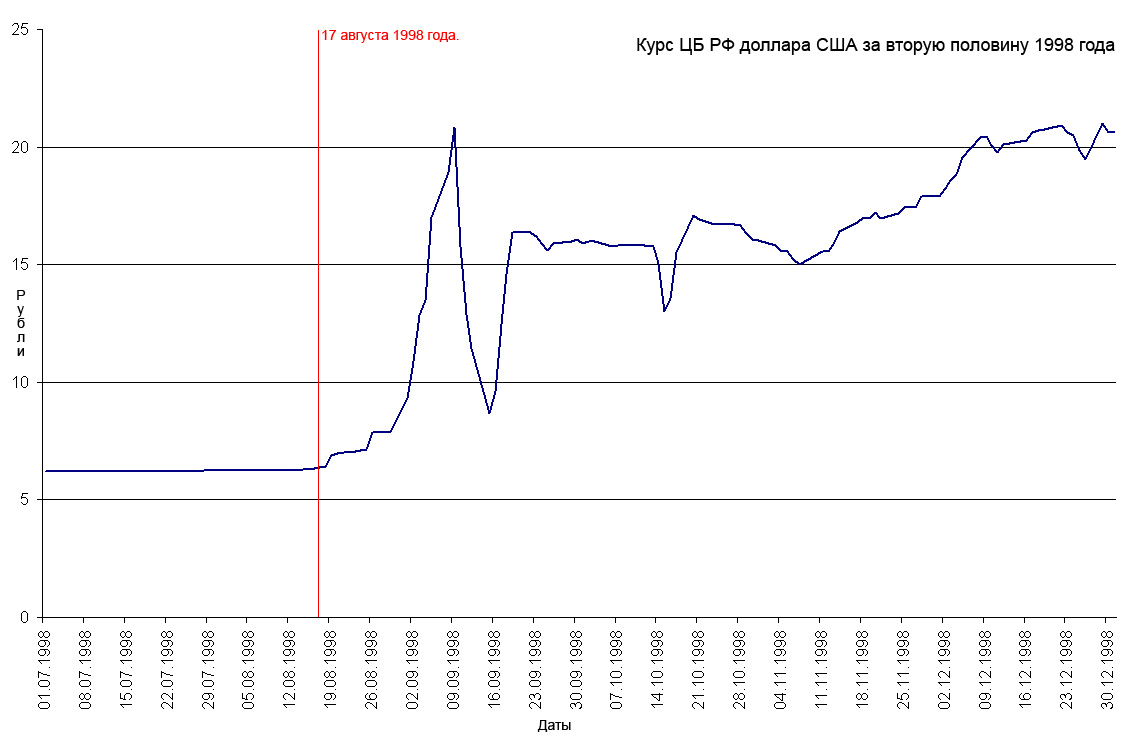
A graph shows the USD to Russian ruble exchange rate in the second half of 1998. In the weeks following 17 August, one US dollar went from being worth 6.43 rubles to being worth over 21 rubles.

The Russian financial crisis (also called the ruble crisis or the Russian flu) began in Russia on 17 August 1998. It resulted in the Russian government and the Russian Central Bank devaluing the ruble and defaulting on its debt. The crisis had severe impacts on the economies of many neighboring countries.

== Background and course of events ==
Russian economy since fall of the Soviet Union (2008 international dollars)

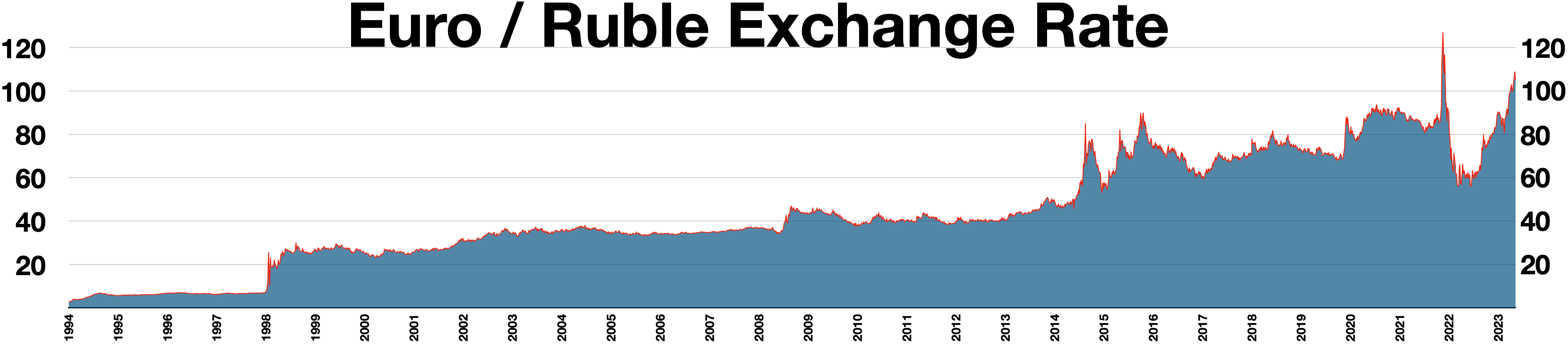
EUR/Ruble exchange rate (Rubles per Euro)

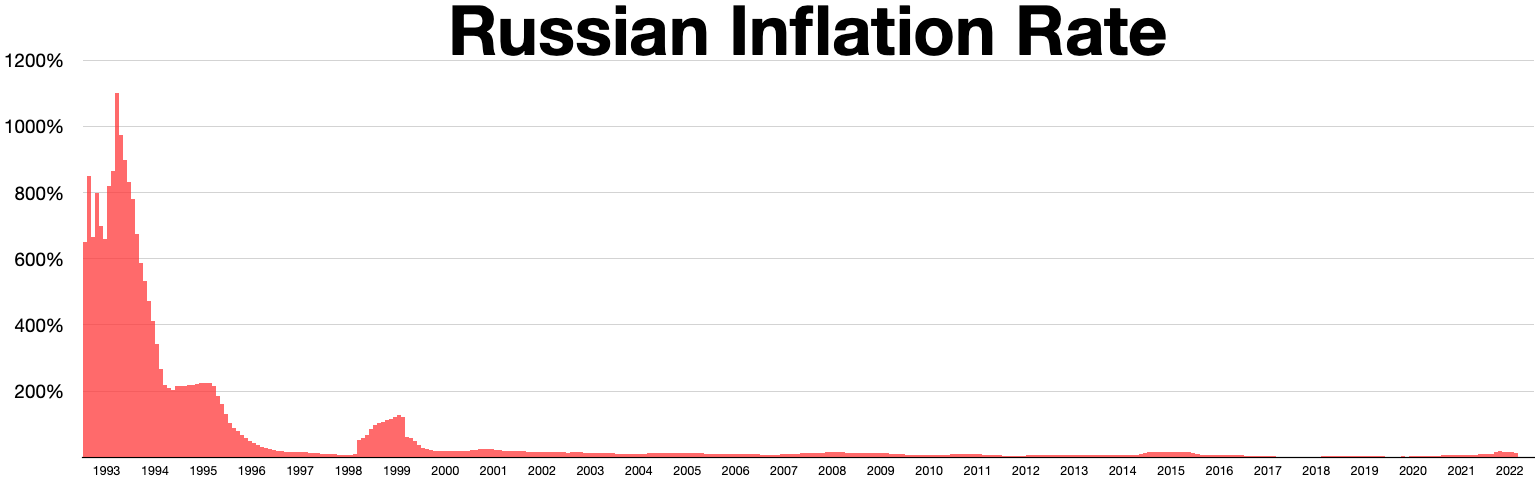
Russian inflation rate 1993-2022

Declining productivity, a high fixed exchange rate between the ruble and foreign currencies to avoid public turmoil, fatal financial imprudence, and a chronic fiscal deficit led to the crisis. The economic cost of the first war in Chechnya took a significant toll on the Russian economy. In early 1995, it was estimated that the war was costing Russia close to $30 million per day. Following the cessation of hostilities in 1996, it was estimated that the war in Chechnya cost Russia $5.5 billion, causing budget deficits close to 10% of their GDP.

In the first half of 1997, the Russian economy showed some signs of improvement. However, soon after this, the problems began to gradually intensify. Two external shocks, the Asian financial crisis that had begun in 1997 and the following declines in demand for (and thus price of) crude oil and nonferrous metals, severely impacted Russian foreign exchange reserves. A political crisis came to a head in March when Russian president Boris Yeltsin suddenly dismissed Prime Minister Viktor Chernomyrdin and his entire cabinet on 23 March 1998. Yeltsin named Energy Minister Sergei Kiriyenko, then 35 years old, as acting prime minister.

On 29 May 1998, Yeltsin appointed Boris Fyodorov as Head of the State Tax Service.

In an effort to prop up the currency and stem the capital flight, in June, Kiriyenko hiked GKO interest rates to 150%.

A $22.6 billion International Monetary Fund and World Bank financial package was approved on 13 July 1998 to support reforms and stabilize the Russian market by swapping out an enormous volume of the quickly maturing GKO short-term bills into long-term Eurobonds. The Russian government decided to keep the exchange rate of the ruble within a narrow band, although many economists, including Andrei Illarionov, urged the government to abandon its support of the ruble.

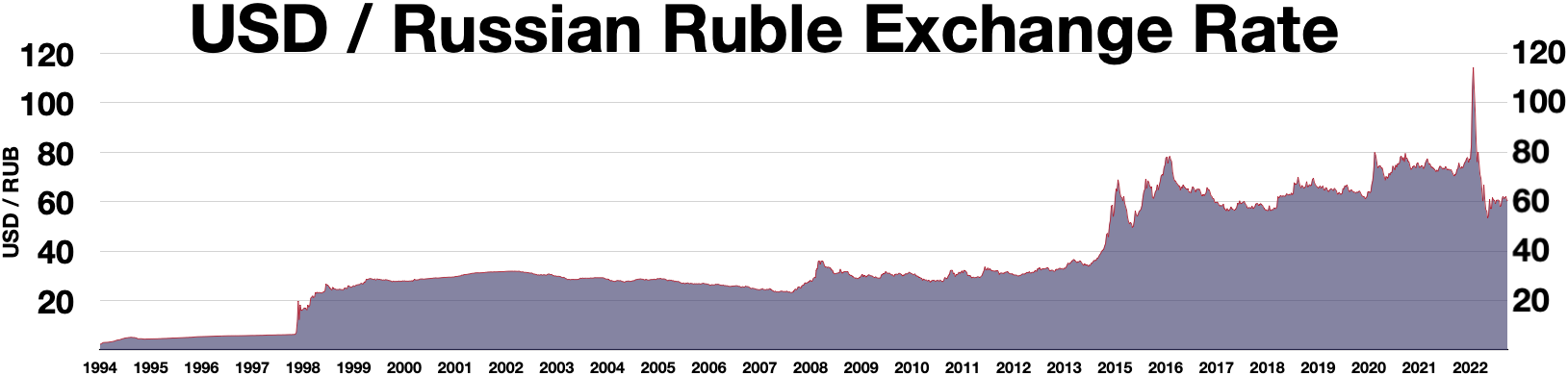
USD / Russian Ruble exchange rate

On 12 May 1998, coal miners went on strike over unpaid wages, blocking the Trans-Siberian Railway. By 1 August 1998, there was approximately $12.5 billion in debt owed to Russian workers. On 14 August, the exchange rate of the Russian ruble to the US dollar was still 6.29. In June 1998, despite the bailout, monthly interest payments on Russia's debt rose to a figure 40 percent higher than its monthly tax collections.

Additionally, on 15 July 1998, the State Duma, which was at the time dominated by left-wing parties, refused to adopt most of the government's anti-crisis plan, so the government was forced to rely on presidential decrees. On 29 July, Yeltsin interrupted his vacation at Dolgiye Borody residence and flew to Moscow, prompting fears of a Cabinet reshuffle, but he only replaced Federal Security Service Chief Nikolay Kovalyov with Vladimir Putin.

At the time, Russia employed a "floating peg" policy toward the ruble, meaning that the Central Bank decided that at any given time the ruble-to-dollar (or RUB/USD) exchange rate would stay within a particular range. If the ruble threatened to devalue outside of that range (or "band"), the Central Bank would intervene by spending foreign reserves to buy rubles. For instance, during the year before the crisis, the Central Bank aimed to maintain a band of 5.3 to 7.1 RUB/USD, meaning that it would buy rubles if the market exchange rate threatened to exceed 7.1 rubles/dollar. Similarly, it would sell rubles if the market exchange rate threatened to drop below 5.3.

The inability of the Russian government to implement a coherent set of economic reforms led to a severe erosion in investor confidence and a chain reaction that can be likened to a run on the Central Bank. Investors fled the market by selling rubles and Russian assets (such as securities), which also put downward pressure on the ruble. This forced the Central Bank to spend its foreign reserves to defend Russia's currency, which in turn further eroded investor confidence and undermined the ruble. It is estimated that between 1 October 1997 and 17 August 1998, the Central Bank expended approximately $27 billion of its U.S. dollar reserves to maintain the floating peg.

It was later revealed that about $5 billion of the international loans provided by the World Bank and International Monetary Fund were stolen upon the funds' arrival in Russia on the eve of the meltdown. Russian representatives describe inquiry into the fate of the money as "anti-Russian".

== Crisis and effects ==
On 17 August 1998, the Russian government devalued the ruble, defaulted on domestic debt, and declared a moratorium on repayment of foreign debt. On that day the Russian government and the Central Bank of Russia issued a "Joint Statement" announcing, in essence, that:

1. the ruble/dollar trading band would expand from 5.3–7.1 RUB/USD to 6.0–9.5 RUB/USD;
2. Russia's ruble-denominated debt would be restructured in a manner to be announced at a later date; and, to prevent mass Russian bank default,
3. a temporary 90-day moratorium would be imposed on the payment of some bank obligations, including certain debts and forward currency contracts.

On 17 August, the government declared that certain state securities, such as GKOs and OFZs, would be transformed into new securities.

At the same time, in addition to widening the currency band, authorities also announced that they intended to allow the RUB/USD rate to move more freely within the wider band.

At the time, the Moscow Interbank Currency Exchange (or "MICEX") set a daily "official" exchange rate through a series of interactive auctions based on written bids submitted by buyers and sellers. When the buy and sell prices matched, this "fixed" or "settled" the official MICEX exchange rate, which would then be published by Reuters. The MICEX rate was (and is) commonly used by banks and currency dealers worldwide as the reference exchange rate for transactions involving the Russian ruble and foreign currencies.

From 17 to 25 August 1998, the ruble steadily depreciated on the MICEX, moving from 6.43 to 7.86 RUB/USD. On 26 August 1998, the Central Bank terminated dollar-ruble trading on the MICEX, and the MICEX did not fix a ruble-dollar rate that day.

On 2 September 1998, the Central Bank of the Russian Federation decided to abandon the "floating peg" policy and float the ruble freely. By 21 September, the exchange rate reached 21 rubles for one US dollar, meaning it lost two-thirds of its value of less than a month earlier.

On 28 September, Boris Fyodorov was discharged from the position of the Head of the State Tax Service.

The moratorium imposed by the Joint Statement expired on 15 November 1998, and the Russian government and Central Bank did not renew it.

Following Russia's default in August, Ukraine also defaulted one month later, in September 1998. Moldova also defaulted in 1998, but ended its default by the end of the year, whereas Russia and Ukraine remained in default until 2000.

=== Inflation ===
Russian inflation in 1998 reached 84 percent and welfare costs grew considerably. Many banks, including Inkombank, Oneximbank, and Tokobank, closed as a result of the crisis.

=== Banking ===
Bankers Trust suffered major losses in the summer of 1998 due to the bank having a large position in Russian government bonds, but avoided financial collapse by being acquired by Deutsche Bank for $10 billion in November 1998. This made Deutsche Bank the fourth-largest money management firm in the world after UBS, Fidelity Investments, and the Japanese post office's life insurance fund.

=== Agriculture ===
The main effect of the crisis on Russian agricultural policy has been a dramatic drop in federal subsidies to the sector, about 80 percent in real terms compared with 1997, though subsidies from regional budgets fell less.

=== Political fallout ===
The financial collapse resulted in a political crisis as Yeltsin, with his domestic support evaporating, had to contend with an emboldened opposition in the parliament. A week later, on 23 August 1998, Yeltsin fired Kiriyenko and declared his intention of returning Chernomyrdin to office as the country slipped deeper into economic turmoil. Powerful business interests, fearing another round of reforms that might cause leading enterprises to fail, welcomed Kiriyenko's fall, as did the Communists.

Yeltsin, who began to lose his hold on power as his health deteriorated, wanted Chernomyrdin back, but the legislature refused to give its approval. After the State Duma rejected Chernomyrdin's candidacy twice, Yeltsin, his power clearly on the wane, backed down. Instead, he nominated Foreign Minister Yevgeny Primakov, who was approved by the State Duma by an overwhelming majority on 11 September 1998.

Primakov's appointment restored political stability because he was seen as a compromise candidate able to heal the rifts between Russia's quarreling interest groups. There was popular enthusiasm for Primakov as well. Primakov promised to make payment of wages and pensions his government's first priority and invited members of the leading parliamentary factions into his Cabinet.

Communists and the Federation of Independent Trade Unions of Russia staged a nationwide strike on 7 October 1998 and called on President Yeltsin to resign. On 9 October 1998, Russia, which was also suffering from a poor harvest, appealed for international humanitarian aid, including food.

== Recovery ==
Russia bounced back from the August 1998 financial crash with surprising speed. Much of the reason for the recovery is that world oil prices increased rapidly during 1999–2000 and Russia ran a large trade surplus in 1999 and 2000. Another reason is that domestic industries, such as food processing, had benefited from the devaluation, which caused a steep increase in the prices of imported goods.

Also, since Russia's economy was operating to such a large extent on barter and other non-monetary instruments of exchange, the financial collapse had far less of an impact on many producers than it would have had the economy been dependent on a banking system. Finally, the economy was helped by an infusion of cash. As enterprises were able to pay off debts in back wages and taxes, consumer demand for goods and services produced by Russian industry began to rise.

== Positive effect ==
The crisis was praised by James Cook, the senior vice president of The U.S. Russia Investment Fund, on the basis that it taught Russian bankers to diversify their assets.

Economist Anders Åslund credits the 1998 financial crisis with providing the decisive push towards real market economy in Romania and most of the post-Soviet countries (which, until then, had only liberalized slowly and partially). For instance, Romania's first major privatization along with the first privatization of a state-owned Romanian bank took place in the aftermath of the Russian crisis, at the end of 1998, November and December respectively.

== See also ==
- GKO, Russian government bonds
- OFZ (bond)
- Great Recession in Russia
- Long-Term Capital Management, hedge fund sunk in the wake of the Russian crisis
- Russian financial crisis (2014–2017)
- 2022 Russian financial crisis

Contemporaneous financial crises

- 1997 Asian financial crisis
- 1998–2002 Argentine great depression, which then led to the 2002 Uruguay banking crisis
- Lost Decade, Japan's economic crisis
- Samba effect

General

- Flight-to-liquidity
- Sovereign default
- Vulture fund
