= Unistream =

Russian international money transfer company

- Company type: Joint-stock company
- Industry: Banking
- Founded: 2001
- Headquarters: Moscow, Russia
- Key people: Kibalnik Nadezhda Nikolaevna (Chairman of the Board), Ksenia Mikhailovna Chernysheva (President of the money transfer system)
- Website: http://unistream.ru/

UNISTREAM (Russian: ЮНИСТРИМ), sometimes written UNISTREAM Bank, is an international money transfer company and bank based in Russia.

The service was originally a department of Uniastrum Bank, but in 2006 became a separate company, with its own banking license.

Unistream has operations at 335,000 locations in over 100 countries.

== History ==
The Unistream system began functioning as a department of Uniastrum Bank in 2001. The system entered the market, offering tariffs from 1%.

In 2005, the management of Uniastrum Bank made a decision to spin off the system into a separate business. On May 31, 2006, the Central Bank of Russia registered CB Unistream OJSC under No. 3467 and on August 16, 2006, issued a banking license to Unistream CB OJSC.

In November 2006, a 26% stake in the British company Aurora Russia Limited was sold. This deal provided an inflow of $20 million and made the foreign company a co-investor in the business.

The Unistream system is a co-founder of the National Payments Council, founded under the auspices of the Central Bank of the Russian Federation and ARB.

According to the results of 2013, Unistream was named “The Best Money Transfer System in Eastern Europe” by International Finance Magazine. 2012 - laureate of IAMTN (International Association of Money Transfer Systems) and Global Banking & Finance Review Awards.

In February 2015, the Expert RA rating agency confirmed the credit rating of JSC CB Unistream on the national scale at the A + level "Very high level of creditworthiness", the forecast is "stable", the second sublevel, and also assigned a rating on the international scale " BBB− "Moderately high level of long-term creditworthiness", outlook "stable".

At the end of 2015, Unistream launched a service for online transfers from bank cards on its own website.

In October 2016, Ukraine banned operations of Unistream and all other Russian payment systems as part of its sanction policy against the "Russian military intervention in Ukraine".

Since 2016, Unistream has been cooperating with the money transfer network Moneyto Ltd, which acquired the rights to use the Unistream Money Transfer trademark in the European Union.

After the Visa and Mastercard payment systems left Russia in March 2022 after the Russian invasion of Ukraine, Unistream became one of the most popular money transfer services for the large number of Russians who departed for “near abroad” countries, such as Armenia, Georgia and Kazakhstan. However, on July 20, 2023, the United States imposed sanctions against Unistream Bank and, accordingly, the payment system. After that, banks in neighboring countries, fearing secondary sanctions, began one after another to refuse to accept or send transfers or limit them to rubles. The payment system promised to develop an alternative solution for cross-border payments.

=== Sanctions ===
On 20 July 2023, Unistream Bank, came under US sanctions, resulting in a number of banks ceasing operations with Unistream.

As of July 25, the Armenian banks Ardshinbank, Converse Bank, Armeconombank, IDBank, Evokabank, Inecobank, the main Georgian banks - Bank of Georgia, Liberty, TBC, BasisBank, Credo Bank, the Kazakh postal system Kazpost and Freedom Finance Bank, the Kyrgyz DemirBank, the largest banks in Moldova - Agroindbank, Moldinkombank, Victoriabank suspended using Unistream.

Immediately after the announcement of sanctions in July, Unistream Bank announced that it would develop an alternative channel for transfers abroad in order to continue to operate as before. Representatives of the bank noted that they have developed an infrastructure solution that allows uninterrupted continuation of interaction with partners as usual and that this solution will be implemented as soon as possible. No specific dates were specified.

== Shareholders ==
- GUTRANSFERS GG LIMITED, 100%

== Activity ==
- The Bank does not operate in the area of highly risky segments, does not operate in the retail lending market.
- International payment system "Unistream" was recognized as the winner in the category "Best Money Transfer System Russia 2015" (The best money transfer system in Russia 2015)
- Unistream is the organizer of the international conference "Bank of the Future", dedicated to payment services, money transfers and innovations.
- Payment system "Unistream" is recognized by the Bank of Russia as nationally significant.
- On May 24, 2017, Expert RA revised the credit rating of JSC CB Unistream due to a change in the methodology and assigned a rating at the level of “ruBBB +” (corresponds to the rating “A + (III)” according to the previously used scale). The rating has a stable outlook.
- Unistream is a member of ARB (Association of Russian Banks), Association “Russia” (Association of Regional Banks of Russia), IAMTN, BACEE, SWIFT.
- In October 2016, the system was included in the Ukraine's sanctions list. Its activity on the territory of Ukraine is prohibited.
- In accordance with the new classification of types of banking licenses of the Bank of Russia, Unistream operates under a universal license, which gives the right to conduct international operations, create branches in a foreign state and provide a wide range of banking services.

== Board of directors ==
- Skvortsov Oleg, Member of the Board of Directors
- Sergey Grigoryan, Member of the Board of Directors
- Eduard Zamanyan, Member of the Board of Directors
