= The U.S. Russia Investment Fund =

Investment fund

- Founded: 1995
- Headquarters: Suite 300, 545 Fifth Avenue, New York City, United States
- Key people: Patricia Cloherty (chairman, 1998–2008); James Cook (Managing Partner)

The U.S. Russia Investment Fund (TUSRIF) was an investment fund from 1995 to 2008. It was established by the United States government to make private investments in the Russian economy. By 2005, it had invested $300 million in 44 Russian companies. James Cook, Managing Director, founded and developed two of the leading companies DeltaBank, the first bank to sell credit cards in Russia, and DeltaCredit, the first bank to sell residential mortgages in Russia. TUSRIF was replaced by the U.S. Russia Foundation (USRF) in 2008, while its financial arm, Delta Private Equity Partners, was purchased by UFG Private Equity, a subsidiary of Deutsche Bank, in 2009.

== History ==
The U.S. Russia Investment Fund was established by the United States federal government in 1995. It was the result of the merger of two funds established in 1993-1994: the $340-million Russian American Enterprise Fund (RAEF) and the $100-million Fund for Large Enterprises (FLEER). Most of the money came from the United States Agency for International Development (USAID). The fund was managed by Delta Capital Management, and its chairman and chief executive officer was Patricia Cloherty.

Its main goal was to promote investments in Russia. It specialized in "early venture, mid venture, and growth capital investments in middle market companies", with a focus on the "media, retail, consumer goods, financial services, information technology, and telecommunication sectors". TUSRIF and Kohlberg Kravis Roberts & Company owned 51% of the Imperial Porcelain Factory until 1999, when it was nationalized by the Government of Russia.

In 2000, it established DeltaBank, the first bank to sell Visa credit cards in Russia. In October 2000, it became a majority shareholder of the European Bank for Reconstruction and Development. Meanwhile, they acquired JPMorgan Chase's banking license in 2000 and established DeltaCredit, the first bank to sell residential mortgages in Russia, in 2001.

The same year, it established the Delta Russian Fund, whose aim was to attract $150 million in venture capital from investors to reinvest in the Russian economy. It also invested in Runet, the Russian internet. The following year, in 2002, it invested $1 million in Egar Technology, a financial trading company, while the International Finance Corporation invested $1.5 million. In 2004, GE purchased the TUSRIF-managed DeltaBank for $150 million.

By 2005, TUSRIF had invested $300 million in 44 Russian companies, including the aforementioned DeltaBank and DeltaCredit as well as two television networks. However, DeltaCredit was acquired by the Société Générale for $100 million that year. Meanwhile, TUSRIF also invested in small businesses, for example in Nizhny Novgorod.

TUSRIF was replaced by the U.S. Russia Foundation (USRF) in 2008. Meanwhile, Delta Capital Management, which became Delta Private Equity Partners, was purchased by UFG Private Equity, a subsidiary of Deutsche Bank, in 2009. Three years later, in 2011, the disposal of $150 million from the fund was tabled by the United States Agency for International Development (USAID) and the United States Congress, on the recommendation from the Obama administration that half should go to the United States Department of the Treasury and half to support American values in Russia. By 2012, the Obama administration asked Congress to allocate only $50 million to support human rights non-profit organizations in Russia.
