= Patricia Cloherty =

American businesswoman

- Born: Patricia Mary Cloherty; July 2, 1942; San Francisco, California, U.S.
- Died: September 23, 2022 (aged 80); Miami, Florida, U.S.
- Education: San Francisco College for Women; Columbia University
- Occupation: Businesswoman

Patricia Mary Cloherty (July 2, 1942 – September 23, 2022) was an American businesswoman, company director, and private equity financier. She was the chairman and CEO of Delta Private Equity Partners. Cloherty served as manager of The U.S. Russia Investment Fund and Delta Russia Fund, two venture capital funds which operated in Russia. In 2004, Cloherty was named Businessperson of the Year by the American Chamber of Commerce in Russia. In 2007, Crain's New York Business named her one of the Most Powerful Women in New York. In 2008, Cloherty received the Order of Friendship from Russian president Vladimir Putin.

== Early life ==
Cloherty earned a bachelor's degree in 1963 from the San Francisco College for Women (now part of the University of San Francisco) and two master's degrees from Columbia University. After graduation, Cloherty spent two years in Brazil from 1963 through 1965 as a member of the newly created Peace Corps.

== Career ==
Cloherty began her career in venture capital at Patricof & Co. Ventures, which she joined in 1969. She was named a partner and later would become president and co-chair of the firm, along with founder Alan Patricof. After she left the firm, Patricof & Co. (now known as Apax Partners), became one of the largest private equity firms globally. In an interview with "Private Equity International" magazine, Cloherty stated that her track record in Russia included 14 write-offs and a return of 1.2 times capital invested.

In 1977, Cloherty was appointed Deputy Administrator of the U.S. Small Business Administration by President Jimmy Carter. In 1979, she founded and ran Tessler & Cloherty with her husband Daniel Tessler, which specialized in small businesses. In 1991, U.S. president George H.W. Bush appointed Ms. Cloherty as chairman of an Investment Advisory Council to revamp the Small Business Investment Company program of the U.S. Small Business Administration.

In 1995 President Clinton appointed Cloherty as a board member of The U.S. Russia Investment Fund with $440 million of investment capital. In 1998 she assumed the role of chairman, and in 2004 she became co-partner of the US Russia Investment Fund's general partner: Delta Private Equity Partners. The funds made direct equity investments in Russian companies in the financial services sector, consumer-related industries, and in the media, telecommunications, semiconductor and biotechnology fields. In April 2009, Private Equity International magazine reported that after a series of failures under Cloherty´s leadership, Delta Private Equity Partners was collaborating with UFG Private Equity, one of its limited partners, to merge with them.

Cloherty was a director of NYSE Euronext. She was a trustee of International House of New York, Teachers College, Columbia University and the Ewing Marion Kauffman Foundation and was a member of the Council on Foreign Relations. Cloherty was a president and chairman of the National Venture Capital Association, the national advocacy group for venture capital firms in the U.S. Cloherty served on the board of directors of Accion International from 1982 to 1986.

In both 2006 and 2007, APAX with Cloherty were named by Forbes Magazine on its "Midas List" of the 100 deal-makers and investors that year. On 17 March 2008 Russian president Vladimir Putin signed a decree awarding Cloherty the Order of Friendship for her contribution to the development of Russian business and for strengthening friendship and cooperation between the Russian Federation and the United States of America. Cloherty was the 2012 recipient of the Women in Private Equity Trailblazer Award, given annually by Falk Marques Group in tribute to pioneering women who have paved the way for their peers in private equity and other alternatives. Cloherty died at her home in Miami on September 23, 2022.
