= GKO =

GKO (abbreviation for Russian: Государственное Краткосрочное Обязательство, romanized: Gosudarstvennoye Kratkosrochnoye Obyazatyelstvo, lit. 'State Short-Term Bonds') are short-term zero-coupon government bonds issued by the Russian Finance Ministry and trade on the Moscow Inter Bank Currency Exchange (MICEX), as well as on five other currency exchanges connected with the MICEX and located in large regional cities. The last GKO auction was held in February 2004.

== History ==
The issuance of a short-term, ruble-denominated bond was approved by the Supreme Soviet of Russia in February 1993. The first GKO auction was held on 18 May 1993. Foreign investors were allowed into the trade from 1996.

=== 1998 default ===
The initials became synonymous with the 1998 Russian financial crisis when the state defaulted on its "GKO obligations" (bonds). The GKO crisis, the most significant financial crisis in post-Soviet Russia, caused turmoil amongst both foreign and domestic investors and creditors. The crisis led to the abrupt devaluation of the Russian ruble in several steps in August and September 1998. (The result of the ruble's value after the fall and some oscillations was the ruble's exchange rate against other nations' currencies was approximately 1/4 of its previous value .) The crisis severely undermined confidence in the ruble's stability, although such dramatic drops did not happen again until 2014.

After 1998 a new series of state bonds was issued. On 1 November 2006, the volume of the GKO-OFZ market reached 850.7 billion rubles at face value, having exceeded by 17.9% the volume reached at the beginning of the year. The market volume is growing as a result of the implementation of the Russian Finance Ministry's policy of substituting the external debt for the internal debt and developing a liquid internal government-securities market, which was intended to give market participants sufficient instruments to manage liquidity and form benchmarks for risk-free ruble interest-rates for all economic entities.

== See also ==
- OFZ (bond)
