= OFZ (bond) =

Coupon-bearing federal loan bonds issued by the Russian government

OFZ (abbreviation for Russian: Облигации федерального займа, romanized: Obligatsyi federal'novo zaima, lit. 'Federal Loan Obligations') are coupon-bearing federal loan bonds issued by the Russian government. The Ministry of Finance auctions off OFZs to finance the federal budget, or less commonly, to bail out troubled banks. Given their role, they form an essential part of the Russian financial system.

OFZs were introduced in June 1995 to complement the GKO market as an instrument with medium and long-term standing. Inflation-linked OFZ bonds are also issued. In August 1998, the Russian government defaulted on domestically issued debt, including OFZs. In 2012, OFZs were connected to the pan-Europe settlement system Euroclear.

The share of foreign-held OFZs increased from nearly zero in 2006 to 25% by the end of 2013. As of February 2018, 33.9% of all outstanding OFZs were held by foreigners. By September 2018 the number had dropped to 27%, due to the threat of further US sanctions against the Russian economy.

In February 2022, ING reported that the share of OFZs held by non-Russians has dropped to about 18%, as a result of the Russian recognition of the Donetsk and Luhansk People's Republics.

On the 22nd July 2026, Russian finance ministry suspended emission of OFZs after weak demand on the last auction at the beginning of the month. This situation last happened in February 2022 when the economic consequences of the Russo-Ukrainian war forced the Central Bank of Russia to raise suddenly its interest rate to 20% making them temporarily unaffordable.

== See also ==
- GKO
- National Settlement Depository
