= List of heads of state of the Soviet Union =

The Constitution of the Soviet Union recognised the Presidium of the Supreme Soviet (between 1938 and 1989) and the earlier Central Executive Committee (CEC) of the Congress of Soviets (between 1922 and 1938) as the highest organs of state authority in the Union of Soviet Socialist Republics (USSR) between legislative sessions. Under the 1924, 1936 and 1977 Soviet Constitutions these bodies served as the collective head of state of the Soviet Union. The chairman of these bodies personally performed the largely ceremonial functions assigned to a single head of state but was provided little real power by the constitution.

The Soviet Union was established in 1922. However, the country's first constitution was only adopted in 1924. Before that time, the 1918 Constitution of the Russian Socialist Federative Soviet Republic functioned as the constitution of the USSR. Based on the 1918 Constitution of the Russian SFSR, the Central Executive Committee (CEC) was established. It had a Presidium with a collective group of chairmen considered as the heads of state and had the power to determine what matters of income and taxation would go to the state budget and what would go to the local soviets, as well as the power to limit taxes. In periods between convocations of the Congress of Soviets the CEC held supreme power. In between sessions of the Congress of Soviets the CEC was responsible for all the affairs of the Congress of Soviets. The CEC and the Congress of Soviets was replaced by the Presidium and the Supreme Soviet respectively by several amendments to the 1936 Constitution in 1938.

Under the 1977 Constitution, the Supreme Soviet was the highest organ of state power and the sole organ in the country to hold legislative authority. Sessions of the Supreme Soviet were convened by the Presidium twice a year; however, special sessions could be convened on the orders of a Union Republic. In the event of a disagreement between the Soviet of the Union and the Soviet of Nationalities the Presidium could form a conciliation commission. If this commission failed, the Presidium could dissolve the Supreme Soviet and order new elections. The Chairman of the Presidium of the Supreme Soviet, along with the first and fifteen other vice chairmen, would be elected by the deputies of the Supreme Soviet. In practice, the Chairman of the Presidium held little influence over policy ever since the delegation of the office's power to the General Secretary of the Communist Party of the Soviet Union (CPSU) during Joseph Stalin's rule.

The Presidency was established in 1990 and the President would, according to the altered constitution, be elected by the Soviet people by direct and secret ballot. However, the first and only Soviet President, Mikhail Gorbachev, was elected by the democratically elected Congress of People's Deputies. In connection with the dissolution of the Soviet Union national elections for the office of President never took place. To be elected to the office a person must have been a Soviet citizen and older than thirty-five but younger than sixty-five years. The same person could not be elected president more than twice. The Presidency was the highest state office, and was the most important office in the Soviet Union by influence and recognition, eclipsing that of Premier and, with the deletion of Article 6 of the Soviet Constitution, General Secretary. With the establishment of the Presidency executive power was shared between the President and the Prime Minister. The President was given broad powers, such as being responsible for negotiating the membership of the Cabinet of Ministers with the Supreme Soviet; the Prime Minister, however, was responsible for managing the nomenklatura and economic matters.

== List of presidents ==
Of the eleven individuals appointed head of state, three died in office of natural causes (Leonid Brezhnev, Yuri Andropov and Konstantin Chernenko), one held the position in a temporary role (Vasily Kuznetsov), and four held posts of party leader and head of state simultaneously (Brezhnev, Andropov, Chernenko and Mikhail Gorbachev). The first head of state was Mikhail Kalinin, who was inaugurated in 1922 after the Treaty on the Creation of the USSR. At over twenty years, Kalinin spent the longest time in office; he died shortly after his resignation in 1946. Andropov spent the shortest time in office.

=== Heads of the Russian Soviet Republic (1917–1922) ===
No.	Portrait	Name (Birth–Death)	Term			Congress Meetings
No.	Portrait	Name (Birth–Death)	Took office	Left office	Duration	Congress Meetings
Chairmen of the Central Executive Committee of the All-Russian Congress of Soviets (1917–1922)
1		Lev Kamenev (1883–1936)	9 November 1917	21 November 1917	12 days	2nd Congress
2		Yakov Sverdlov (1885–1919)	21 November 1917	16 March 1919 †	1 year, 115 days	3rd–6th Congress
—		Mikhail Vladimirsky (1874–1951); Acting	16 March 1919	30 March 1919	14 days	—
3		Mikhail Kalinin (1875–1946)	30 March 1919	30 December 1922	3 years, 275 days	7th–10th Congress

=== Heads of the Soviet Union (1922–1991) ===
No. (Note: Repeat head of state and vice heads of state are numbered only once; subsequent terms are marked with their original number italicised. Acting heads of state are not numbered. These numbers are not official.)	Portrait	Name (Birth–Death)	Term			Supreme Soviet Convocations (Note: A convocation in the Soviet sense of the word were elected members of Parliament in between elections.)
No.	Portrait	Name (Birth–Death)	Took office	Left office	Duration	Supreme Soviet Convocations
1	Chairmen of the Presidium of the Central Executive Committee of the Congress of Soviets (Note: While the Presidium of the Central Executive Committee had a collective group of chairmen, the chairman from the Russian SFSR was often considered as the first among equals.) (1922–1938)					
1		Mikhail Kalinin (1875–1946)	30 December 1922	12 January 1938	15 years, 13 days	1st–8th Convocation
1	Chairmen of the Presidium of the Supreme Soviet (1938–1989)					
1		Mikhail Kalinin (1875–1946)	17 January 1938	19 March 1946	8 years, 61 days	1st Convocation
2		Nikolai Shvernik (1888–1970)	19 March 1946	15 March 1953	6 years, 361 days	2nd–3rd Convocation
3		Kliment Voroshilov (1881–1969)	15 March 1953	7 May 1960	7 years, 53 days	3rd–5th Convocation
4		Leonid Brezhnev (1906–1982)	7 May 1960	15 July 1964	4 years, 69 days	5th–6th Convocation
5		Anastas Mikoyan (1895–1978)	15 July 1964	9 December 1965	1 year, 147 days	6th Convocation
6		Nikolai Podgorny (1903–1983)	9 December 1965	16 June 1977	11 years, 189 days	6th–9th Convocation
(4)		Leonid Brezhnev (1906–1982)	16 June 1977	10 November 1982 †	5 years, 147 days	9th–10th Convocation
—		Vasily Kuznetsov (1901–1990); Acting	10 November 1982	16 June 1983	218 days	10th Convocation
7		Yuri Andropov (1914–1984)	16 June 1983	9 February 1984 †	238 days	10th Convocation
—		Vasily Kuznetsov (1901–1990); Acting	9 February 1984	11 April 1984	62 days	11th Convocation
8		Konstantin Chernenko (1911–1985)	11 April 1984	10 March 1985 †	333 days	11th Convocation
—		Vasily Kuznetsov (1901–1990)	10 March 1985	27 July 1985	139 days	11th Convocation
9		Andrei Gromyko (1909–1989)	27 July 1985	1 October 1988	3 years, 66 days	11th Convocation
10		Mikhail Gorbachev (1931–2022)	1 October 1988	25 May 1989	236 days	11th–12th Convocation
10	Chairman of the Supreme Soviet (1989–1990) (Note: On 15 March 1990 most constitutional powers were transferred to the newly created office of President of the Soviet Union. Anatoly Lukyanov was elected Chairman of the Supreme Soviet to replace Mikhail Gorbachev. Although the Chairman's office retained its name, it was now that of a parliamentary speaker, not a head of state. Real executive powers were retained by Gorbachev.)					
10		Mikhail Gorbachev (1931–2022)	25 May 1989	15 March 1990	294 days	12th Convocation
10	President of the Soviet Union (1990–1991)					
10		Mikhail Gorbachev (1931–2022)	15 March 1990	25 December 1991	1 year, 285 days	12th Convocation

== List of vice presidents ==
There were five individuals appointed vice head of state. In 1944, Nikolai Shvernik was the first vice head of state until 1946, the position was abolished and later re-established in 1977. At over eight years, Vasily Kuznetsov spent the longest time in office. Gennady Yanayev spent the shortest time in office.

No.	Portrait	Name (Birth–Death)	Term			Supreme Soviet Convocations
No.	Portrait	Name (Birth–Death)	Took office	Left office	Duration	Supreme Soviet Convocations
First Deputy Chairman of the Presidium of the Supreme Soviet (1944–1946) (1977–1989)
1		Nikolai Shvernik (1888–1970)	4 March 1944	25 June 1946	2 years, 113 days	1st Convocation
2		Vasily Kuznetsov (1901–1990)	7 October 1977	18 June 1986	8 years, 254 days	9th–11th Convocation
3		Pyotr Demichev (1917–2010)	18 June 1986	1 October 1988	2 years, 105 days	11th Convocation
4		Anatoly Lukyanov (1930–2019)	1 October 1988	25 May 1989	236 days	11th–12th Convocation
4	Deputy Chairman of the Supreme Soviet (1989–1990)					
4		Anatoly Lukyanov (1930–2019)	25 May 1989	15 March 1990	294 days	12th Convocation
Vice President of the Soviet Union (1990–1991)
5		Gennady Yanayev (1937–2010)	27 December 1990	21 August 1991 (Note: Yanayev was Acting President of the Soviet Union during the August Coup of 1991, but was jailed following the coup's collapse and Gorbachev returned to his post as President.)	237 days	12th Convocation
—	Office abolished		21 August 1991	26 December 1991 (Note: Following the failed August Coup of 1991 the State Council was given the power to elect a Vice President in the temporary absence of the President.)	127 days	12th Convocation

== See also ==
Soviet Union-related

- Presidium of the Supreme Soviet
- Supreme Soviet of the Soviet Union
- List of leaders of the Soviet Union
- Premier of the Soviet Union
- List of governments of the Soviet Union
- List of spouses of the heads of state of the Soviet Union
- General Secretary of the Communist Party of the Soviet Union

Russia-related

- List of leaders of the Russian SFSR
- List of heads of government of Russia
- List of presidents of the Russian Federation
