= Politics of the Soviet Union =

The political system of the Soviet Union took place in a federal communist state framework. The Supreme Soviet of the Soviet Union functioned as the supreme organ of state power and only branch of government per the principle of unified state power. The CPSU held state activities by holding two-thirds of the seats in the Supreme Soviet, and these party members are responsible for implementing the policies adopted by the CPSU Central Committee and Party Congress. The Supreme Soviet had unlimited state power bar the limitations it sets on itself in the state constitution. By controlling the Supreme Soviet, the CPSU had a complete monopoly of state power until 1990.

== Background ==
The Bolsheviks who took power during the October Revolution, the final phase of the Russian Revolution, were the first communist party to take power and attempt to showcase the Leninist variant of Marxism in a practical way. Although they grew very quickly during the Revolution, from 24,000 to 100,000 members, and received less than a quarter of votes in the Constituent Assembly elections in November 1917, the Bolsheviks were a minority party when they took power by force in Petrograd and Moscow. The Bolsehviks performed best in Petrograd and Vitebsk, Minsk, Smolensk, and Petrograd Guberniia in western Russia; Tver, Vladimir, Moscow Guberniia, and Moscow in central Russia; and among the soldiers on the Northern and Western Fronts and the sailors of the Baltic Fleet. The Bolsheviks and their allies argued that the results were not valid, and that the soviets, where the Bolsheviks held more political power, were a more accurate reflection of public will. The Bolsheviks' advantages as a political party were discipline and a platform supporting workers, peasants, soldiers, and sailors who had seized factories, organized soviets, appropriated the lands of the aristocracy and other large landholders, deserted from the army, and mutinied against the navy during the February Revolution.

Karl Marx made no detailed proposals for the structure of a socialist or communist government and society other than the replacement of capitalism with socialism and eventually communism by the victorious working class. Vladimir Lenin, the leader of the Bolsheviks, had developed the theory that a communist party should serve as the vanguard of the proletariat and ruling in their name and interest, but like Marx had not developed a detailed economic or political program. The new communist government of the Soviet Union faced alarming problems, such as extending practical control beyond the major cities, combatting counter-revolution and opposing political parties, coping with the continuing war and setting up a new economic and political system.

Despite their relative discipline, the Bolsheviks were not of one mind. They were a coalition of committed revolutionaries, but with somewhat differing views as to what was practical. These diverging tendencies resulted in debates within the party over the next decade, followed by a period of consolidation of the party as definitive policies, programs, and directions were adopted.

== Supreme state organ of power ==
=== Congress of Soviets (1922–1936) and the Supreme Soviet (1936–1989) ===
The Congress of Soviets was the supreme organ of power in accordance with Article 8 of the 1924 Soviet Constitution. The Congress was replaced in the 1936 Soviet Constitution by the Supreme Soviet of the Soviet Union. In accordance with Article 30, it functioned as the highest state authority and the supreme state organ of power. According to Article 108 of the 1977 Soviet Constitution, the Supreme Soviet was empowered to deal with all matters within the jurisdiction of the Soviet Union. The admission of new republics; creation of new autonomous republics and autonomous regions; approval of the five-year plan for social and economic development; and creation of the state budget and the institution of bodies to which the Soviet Union was accountable were the exclusive prerogative of the Supreme Soviet of the Soviet Union. The law of the Soviet Union was enacted by the Supreme Soviet or by referendum.

External videos
- Soviet election in 1938

The Supreme Soviet consisted of two chambers, the Soviet of the Union and the Soviet of Nationalities which had equal rights and an equal number of deputies. The Soviet of the Union was elected by constituencies with equal populations while the Soviet of Nationalities was elected on the basis of the following representation: 32 deputies from each Union Republic, 11 deputies from each autonomous republic, five deputies from each autonomous region and one deputy from each autonomous area. The Soviet of the Union and the Soviet of Nationalities (upon submission by the elected credentials commissions) had the power to decide the validity of the elected deputies' credentials and (in cases where election law had been violated) would declare the election null and void. Both chambers elected a chairman and four Deputies. The Chairmen of the Soviet of the Union and the Soviet of Nationalities presided over sessions of their respective chambers and conducted their affairs. Joint sessions of the chambers were presided over by (alternately) the Chairman of the Soviet of the Union and the Chairman of the Soviet of Nationalities.

=== Congress of People's Deputies and State Council (1989–1991) ===
Through a constitutional amendment made by Mikhail Gorbachev, the Supreme Soviet became a permanent parliament which was elected by the Congress of the People's Deputies. In the 1989 Soviet legislative election, the Soviet people, elected for the first time candidates democratically. The new amendment called for a smaller working body (later known as the Supreme Soviet) to be elected by the 2,250-member Congress of People's Deputies. One-third of the seats in the Congress of People's Deputies was reserved for the Communist Party and other public organisations. The amendment clearly stated that multiple candidates could participate in elections and Soviet voters stunned the authorities by voting for non-CPSU candidates and reformers. However, genuine reformers were estimated to have won only about 300 seats. Following the failed August Coup attempt, the State Council became the highest organ of state power "in the period of transition".

== Executive organ ==
=== Premier and the Council (1922–1991) ===
According to the 1924 Soviet Constitution, the supreme executive and administrative organ was headed by the Council of People's Commissars. In the 1977 Soviet Constitution, the Council of Ministers was the head of the executive organ. The Council of Ministers was formed at a joint meeting of the Soviet of the Union and the Soviet of Nationalities. The Council consisted of the Chairman, the First Deputies, the Deputies, the ministers, the chairmen of the state committees and the Chairmen of the Council of Ministers of the Soviet Republics. The Chairman of the Council of Ministers could recommend to the Supreme Soviet other heads of organisations in the Soviet Union as members of the council. The Council of Ministers laid down its power before the first session of the newly elected Supreme Soviet.

The Council of Ministers was both responsible for and accountable to the Supreme Soviet, and in the period between sessions of the Supreme Soviet it was accountable to the Presidium of the Supreme Soviet. The Council of Ministers regularly reported to the Supreme Soviet on its work. It was tasked with resolving all state administrative duties within the jurisdiction of the Soviet Union, to the degree that they did not come under the competence of the Supreme Soviet or the Presidium. Within its limits, the Council of Ministers had authority to do the following tasks:

- Ensure management of the national economy and its socio-cultural construction and development.
- Formulate and submit the five-year plan of "economic and social development" and the state budget to the Supreme Soviet and submit its fulfilment to the Supreme Soviet.
- Defend the interests of the state, socialist property and public order and protect the rights of Soviet citizens.
- Ensure state security.
- Exercise general leadership of the Soviet armed forces and determine how many were to be drafted into service.
- Exercise general leadership over Soviet foreign relations; trade and the economic, scientific-technical and cultural cooperation of the USSR with foreign countries. It also confirmed and announced international treaties signed by the USSR.
- Set up necessary organisations within the Council of Ministers in matters of economics, socio-cultural issues and defence.

The Council of Ministers also had the power to issue decrees and resolutions and to later verify their execution. All organisations were obligated to follow the decrees and resolutions issued by the All-Union Council of Ministers. The All-Union Council also had the power to suspend all issues and decrees made by itself or organisations subordinate to it. It coordinated and directed the work of the republics and their ministries, state committees and other organs subordinate to the All-Union Council. Finally, the competence of the Council of Ministers and its Presidium in their procedures and activities (and its relationship with subordinate organs) was defined in the Soviet constitution by the law on the Council of Ministers of the Soviet Union.

=== President and the Cabinet (1991) ===
In 1990, Mikhail Gorbachev created the office of the President of the Soviet Union. In the meantime, the Council of Ministers was dissolved and replaced by the Cabinet of Ministers of the Soviet Union. The new cabinet was headed by the Prime Minister. Gorbachev's election as president marked the third time in one year he was elected to an office equivalent to that of Soviet head of state. He was elected by the Congress of People's Deputies on all three occasions.

== Judiciary ==
The Supreme Court was the highest judicial body in the country as it supervised the administration of justice by the courts of the Soviet Union and its soviet republics within the limits of established law. The leadership of the Supreme Court was elected by the Supreme Soviet. The exceptions were the Chairmen of the Supreme Courts of the Soviet Republics, who were ex officio members. The organisation and the procedures of the Supreme Court were defined by law. As written in Article 157 of the Brezhnev Constitution, "[j]ustice is administered in the USSR on the principle of the equality of citizens before the law and the court". In the following articles, it was made clear that all individuals (no matter their circumstances) had the right to legal assistance. All judicial proceedings in the Soviet Union were conducted in the language of the Soviet republic, "Autonomous Republic, Autonomous Region, or Autonomous Area, or in the language spoken by the majority of the people in the locality". People who participated in court proceedings without knowledge of the language had the right to become fully acquainted with the materials in the case, the right to an interpreter during the proceedings and the right to address the court in their own language.

According to Article 165, the Procurator General was appointed to the office by the Supreme Soviet. The Procurator General was responsible and accountable to the Supreme Soviet, or between sessions of the Supreme Soviet to the Presidium of the Supreme Soviet. The Procurator General supervised most activities of Soviet agencies such as ministries, state committees and local Prosecutor Generals. Subordinate agencies of the Procurator General exercised their functions independent from meddling by the Soviet state and were subordinate only to the Prosecutor General's office. The organisation and procedures of these subordinates were defined in the law on the Procurator General's Office of the Soviet Union.

== Role of the Communist Party ==
According to Article 6 of the Soviet Constitution, the "leading and guiding force of Soviet society and the nucleus of its political system, of all state organisations and public organisations, is the Communist Party of the Soviet Union. The CPSU exists for the people and serves the people". The Communist Party was officially a Marxist–Leninist communist party which determined the general development of Soviet society both in domestic and foreign policy. It also directed the "great work" of building communism through central planning of the economy and the struggle for the victory of communism. All Communist Party organisations had to follow the framework laid down by the 1977 Soviet Constitution. After mounting pressure against him by the reformers, Mikhail Gorbachev removed the phrase "the leading and guiding force" and replaced it with "the Communist Party of the Soviet Union, and other political parties".

The nomenklatura was the Soviet Union's ruling group and remained one of the main reasons why the Soviet Union existed as long as it did. Members of the nomenklatura were elected by the Communist Party to all important posts in Soviet society which could mean a locally or nationally significant office. Along with the Communist party's monopoly on power, this led to the gradual physical and intellectual degeneration of the Soviet Union as a state. As long as the General Secretary of the Communist Party commanded the loyalty of the Politburo, he would remain more-or-less unopposed and in all probability become the leader of the country.

=== Organization ===
The Communist Party controlled the government apparatus and made decisions affecting the economy and society. The Communist Party followed the ideology of Marxism–Leninism and operated on the principle of democratic centralism. The primary party bodies were the Politburo, the highest decision-making organ; the Secretariat, the controller of party bureaucracy; and the Central Committee, the party's policy forum. Party membership reached more than 19 million (9.7 percent of the adult population) in 1987 and was dominated by male Russian professionals. Party members occupied positions of authority in all officially recognized institutions throughout the country.

Single party rule combined with democratic centralism, which in practice consisted of a hierarchal structure which with the aid of a secret police organization enforced decisions made by the ruling party as well on the personnel of all governmental institutions, including the courts, the press, cultural and economic organizations and labor unions. The Soviet Union is considered by many to have been a totalitarian state for much of its existence. Critics include Western authors such as Robert Conquest and Russian critics such as Alexander Yakovlev.

=== Ideology ===
Education and political discourse proceeded on the assumption that it was possible to mold people using collectivist institutional forms into an ideal Soviet man or woman (see new Soviet man). The validity of ideas, public discourse, and institutional form were evaluated in terms of the official ideology of Marxism–Leninism as interpreted by the Communist Party.

== See also ==
- Economy of the Soviet Union
- History of the Soviet Union
- List of governments of the Soviet Union
- List of heads of state of the Soviet Union
- Premier of the Soviet Union
