= Declaration of the Creation of the Union of Soviet Socialist Republics =

Formative document of the Union of Soviet Socialist Republics

- Created: 22 December 1922
- Ratified: 30 December 1922
- Signatories: Russian SFSR; Ukrainian SSR; Byelorussian SSR; Transcaucasian SFSR
- Purpose: To state the reasons necessitating the formation of a union between all existing Soviet republics into one united state

The Declaration on the Creation of the Union of Soviet Socialist Republics is a historical document which, together with the Treaty on the Creation of the Union of Soviet Socialist Republics, formed the constitutional basis for the creation of the USSR as a multinational state.

The Declaration stated the reasons necessitating the formation of a union between all existing Soviet republics into one united socialist state and expressed willingness to undertake a 'permanent revolution', exporting the Socialist Revolution to other states, primarily in the West, as evidenced by the recent Polish–Soviet War. The Declaration also stressed that the creation of the USSR was a voluntary union of peoples with equal rights, whereby each Soviet republic retained the right to freely secede from the Union, a provision that was used as the legal basis for the independence of several republics and the subsequent dissolution of the Union in 1991.

The draft declaration was endorsed on 29 December 1922, by a conference of plenipotentiary delegations from the Russian SFSR, the Ukrainian SSR, Byelorussian SSR, and the Transcaucasian SFSR. On 30 December 1922, the declaration together with the Treaty on the Establishment of the USSR was adopted by the First Congress of Soviets of the USSR. It was included as preamble in the Constitution of the USSR of 1924.

== See also ==
- October Revolution Day
- Treaty on the Creation of the Union of Soviet Socialist Republics
