= 1922 Soviet Union legislative election =

Legislative election in the Soviet Union

- 30 December 1922

All 2,214 seats in the All-Union Congress of Soviets
- Turnout: 22.3%
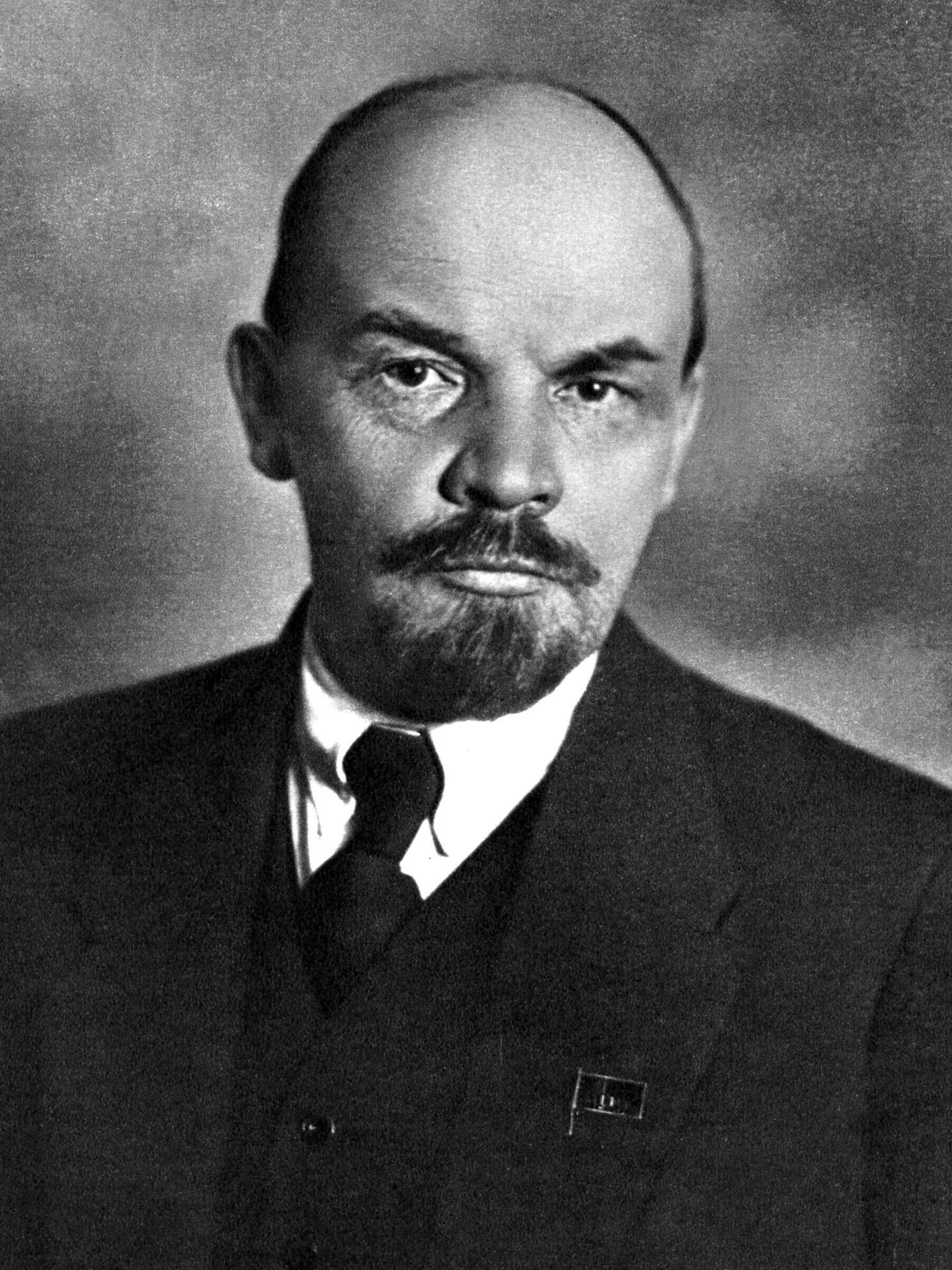

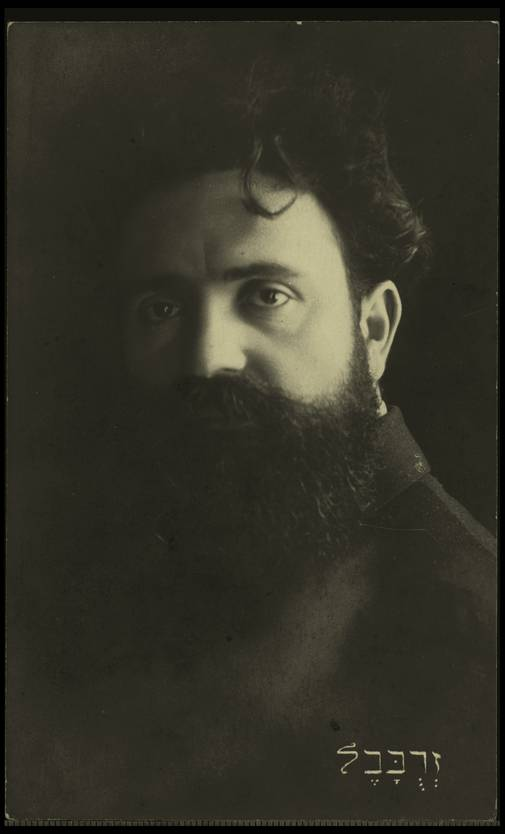

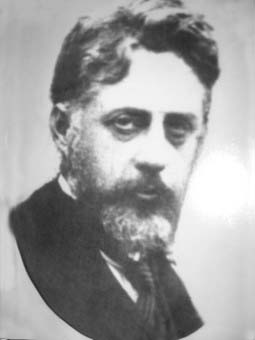

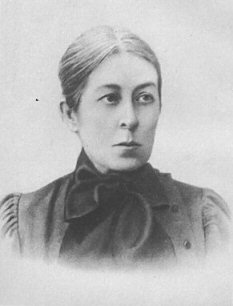
	First party	Second party	Third party
Leader	Vladimir Lenin	Ya'akov Zerubavel	Georgiy Laskhishvili
Party	RKP(b)	Poale Zion	SSPSP
Leader since	17 January 1912
Seats won	2082	2	2
	Fourth party	Fifth party
Leader	Vera Figner
Party	Anarchists	Independents
Seats won	1	127
Chairman of the Council of People's Commissars before election
New Position
Independent
Elected Chairman of the Council of People's Commissars
Vladimir Lenin
RKP(b)

Elections to the First All-Union Congress of Soviets were held on December 30, 1922 in the Soviet Union, at which 2,214 deputies were elected.

The Congress of Soviets was convened following the end of the main hostilities of the Russian Civil War, when the overwhelming number of White Army forces were defeated. As a result, there was a need to unite the autonomous Bolshevik forces within a single state and government, for which it was decided to convene the All-Union Congress of Soviets, where representatives from all the Soviets of Workers' and Soldiers' Deputies could sign an agreement on the formation of the USSR.

== Results ==
Party	Seats
Russian Communist Party (Bolsheviks)	2,082
Poale Zion	2
Georgian Socialist-Federalist Revolutionary Party	2
Anarchists	1
Independents	127
Total	2,214
Source: Nohlen & Stöver
