= Constitution of the Soviet Union =

During its existence, the Soviet Union had three different communist state constitutions enforced individually at different times between 31 January 1924 to 26 December 1991.

== Chronology of Soviet constitutions ==
These three constitutions were:

- 1918 Constitution of Soviet Russia – adopted 10 July 1918 (De facto Constitution of the USSR from 1922 to 1924)
- 1924 Constitution of the Soviet Union – adopted 31 January 1924 ("Lenin Constitution")
- 1936 Constitution of the Soviet Union – adopted 5 December 1936 ("Stalin Constitution")
- 1977 Constitution of the Soviet Union – adopted 7 October 1977 ("Brezhnev Constitution")

The Constitutions of the Soviet Union were modeled after the 1918 Russian Constitution established by the Russian Soviet Federative Socialist Republic (RSFSR), the immediate predecessor and a constituent republic of the Soviet Union. These constitutions shared and upheld most basic provisions including the Soviet Union as a socialist state, the leadership of the working class, the forms of social property, and called for a system of soviets (councils) to exercise governmental authority. Soviet constitutions declared certain political rights, such as freedom of speech, freedom of assembly, and freedom of religion, and inline with the state Marxist-Leninist ideology also identified a series of economic and social rights, as well as a set of duties of all citizens. Soviet constitutions established the bodies of the Government of the Soviet Union, outlined democratic rights, and stated the legislature was to be elected at periodical elections. Soviet constitutions became progressively longer and detailed, featuring more articles and provisions which generously expanded the rights and freedoms of the Soviet people including the right to housing and right to work. The 1936 Constitution received amendments in 1944 to allow the Soviet Union's constituent republics to be recognized as sovereign states in international law, resulting in the Ukrainian SSR and Byelorussian SSR joining the United Nations General Assembly as founding members in 1945.

The 1924 Constitution and 1936 Constitution were enacted by the Congress of Soviets, the supreme governing body of the Soviet Union since its founding in 1922. The Congress of Soviets dissolved itself upon enactment of the 1936 Constitution, replacing itself as supreme governing body with the Supreme Soviet of the Soviet Union which later enacted the 1977 Constitution.

The Constitution of the Soviet Union was effectively repealed upon the dissolution of the Soviet Union on 26 December 1991.

== Constitution of the Post-Soviet states ==
- Armenia
- Azerbaijan
- Belarus
- Estonia
- (Georgia (country)) Georgia
- Kazakhstan
- Kyrgyzstan
- Latvia
- Lithuania
- Moldova
- Russia
- Tajikistan
- Turkmenistan
- Ukraine
- Uzbekistan

== See also ==
- Constitution of Russia
- Bibliography of the Russian Revolution and Civil War § Government
- Bibliography of Stalinism and the Soviet Union § Government
- Bibliography of the post-Stalinist Soviet Union § Government and politics
- Soviet democracy
