= Treaty on the Creation of the Union of Soviet Socialist Republics =

1922 treaty creating the Soviet Union

Declaration and Treaty on the Creation of the Union of Soviet Socialist Republics
Декларация и договор об образовании СССР (Russian) Декларація та договір про утворення СРСР (Ukrainian) Дэкларацыя і дагавор аб утварэнні СССР (Belarusian)
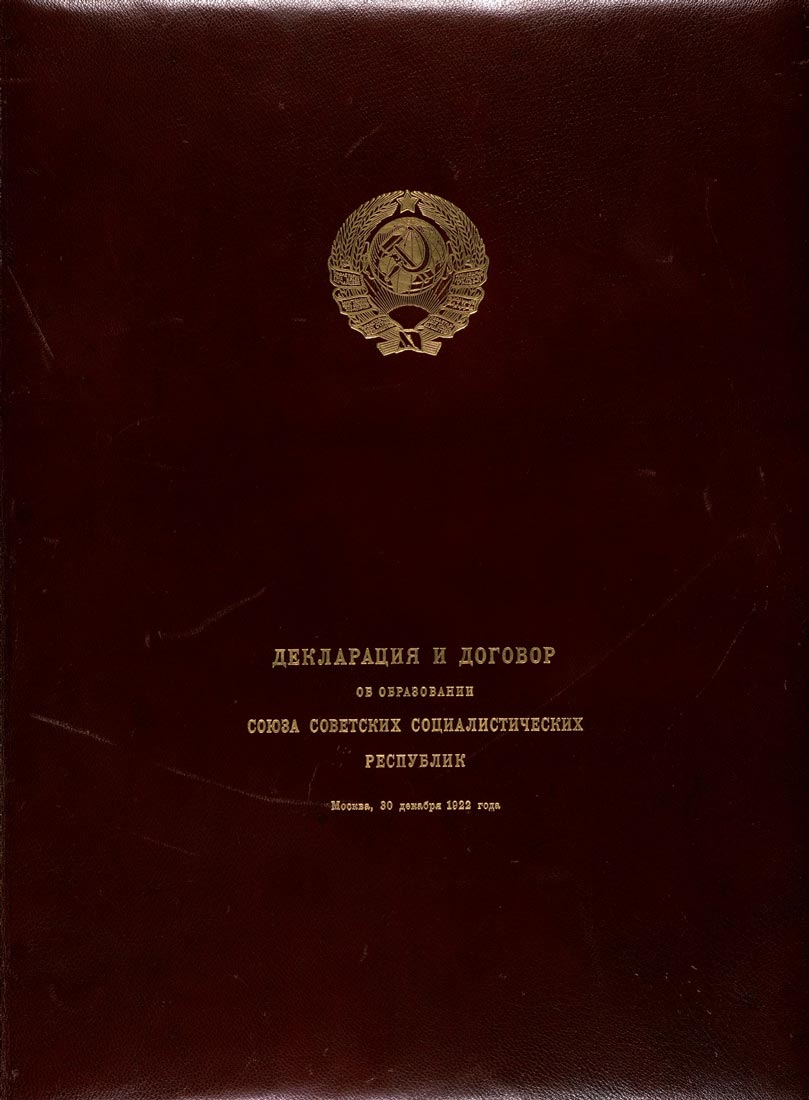
- Type: Union treaty
- Signed: 29 December 1922
- Location: Moscow, Russian SFSR
- Effective: 30 December 1922
- Expiration: 8 December 1991 (Belovezha Accords); 21 December 1991 (Alma-Ata Protocol); 26 December 1991 (Union dissolved by Supreme Soviet)
- Signatories: Mikhail Frunze; Mikhail Kalinin; Grigory Petrovsky; Aleksandr Chervyakov; Mikhail Tskhakaya
- Parties: Russian SFSR; Ukrainian SSR; Byelorussian SSR; Transcaucasian SFSR
- Languages: Russian

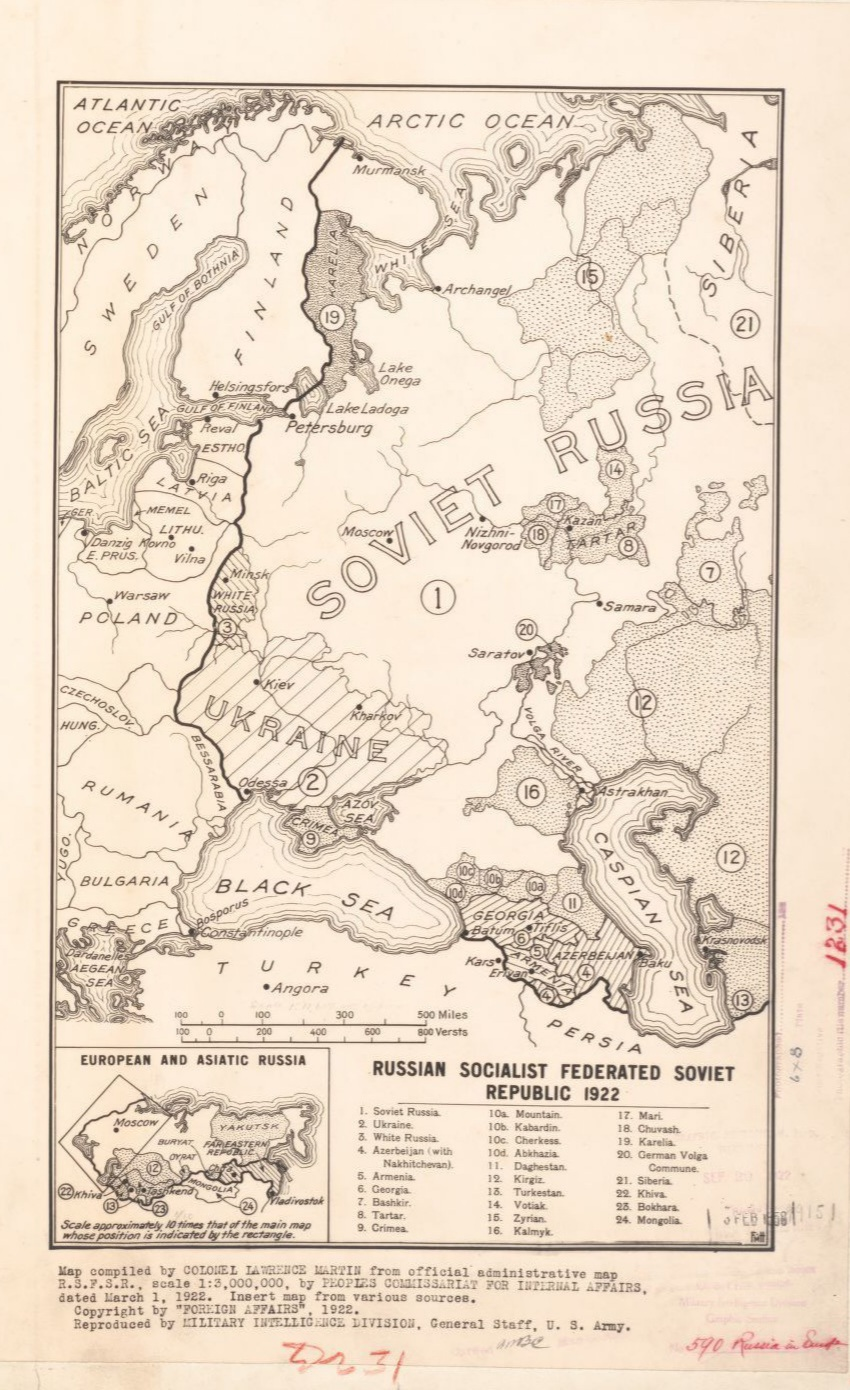
Map of the USSR at the time of its creation. The Byelorussian SSR is labelled "White Russia."

The Declaration and Treaty on the Formation of the Union of Soviet Socialist Republics (Russian: Декларация и договор об образовании Союза Советских Социалистических Республик) officially created the Union of Soviet Socialist Republics (USSR), commonly known as the Soviet Union. It de jure legalised a political union of several Soviet republics that had existed since 1919 and created a new federal government whose key functions were centralised in Moscow. Its legislative branch consisted of the Congress of Soviets and the Central Executive Committee of the Soviet Union, while the Council of People's Commissars composed the executive.

The Treaty, along with the Declaration of the Creation of the USSR was approved on 30 December 1922 by a conference of delegations from the Russian SFSR, the Transcaucasian SFSR, the Ukrainian SSR and the Byelorussian SSR. The Treaty and the Declaration were confirmed by the First All-Union Congress of Soviets and signed by heads of delegations – Mikhail Kalinin, Mikhail Tskhakaya, and Grigory Petrovsky, Alexander Chervyakov respectively on December 30, 1922. The treaty provided flexibility to admit new members. Therefore, by 1940 the Soviet Union grew from the founding four (or six, depending on whether 1922 or 1940 definitions are applied) republics to 16 republics.

On 8 December 1991, Russian, Ukrainian and Belarusian presidents signed the Belovezha Accords. The agreement declared the dissolution of the USSR by its remaining founder states (denunciation of the Treaty on the Creation of the USSR) and established the Commonwealth of Independent States (CIS). On 10 December, the accord was ratified by the Ukrainian and Belarusian parliaments. On 12 December, the agreement was ratified by the Russian Parliament; therefore, the Russian SFSR renounced the Treaty on the Creation of the USSR and de facto declared Russia's independence from the USSR.

On 26 December 1991, the USSR was dissolved by the Council of the Republics of the Supreme Soviet of the Soviet Union, the upper house of the Supreme Soviet of the Soviet Union (the lower house, the Soviet of the Union, was without a quorum).

== Background ==
The treaty's text was prepared by a commission of the Central Committee of the Communist Party of the Soviet Union (at that time the Russian Communist Party, the Bolsheviks).

The treaty was a result of many internal political conflicts within the Bolshevik Party and governments inside the Union. Initially, Vladimir Lenin did not see that Russia's October Revolution would end all foreign borders as such. That view was supported by Leon Trotsky and his followers, who believed that Russia was only a first step in a future world revolution. However, as the Red Army approached the edges of the former Russian Empire and its borders (including the newly created borders of areas that had declared independence after the October Revolution), it needed an excuse to cross them. One such method was a creation of an alternative government, a Soviet Republic, which would then take over authority as the Red Army ousted the existing government. That was the case with Ukraine, Georgia, Armenia and Azerbaijan and failed campaigns such as in the Baltic States and Poland. Alternatively, it would use the presence of a minority to undermine the standing army (such as the establishment Tatar and Bashkir autonomies) and, where there was no national minority, a government based on geographical locale – Far Eastern Republic, Turkestan.

However, the Red Army's ultimate failure in the Polish–Soviet War placed the Bolshevik world revolution plans on hold. Simultaneously, the growing figure of Joseph Stalin pursued a different agenda. Lenin himself saw the creation of national republics as a permanent feature in line with his korenizatsiya policies. In spring of 1922, Lenin suffered his first stroke, and Stalin, still being a People's Commissar for Nationalities, gained a new official chair as the General Secretary of the Communist Party.

Stalin argued that, because the Russian Civil War had now concluded and war communism had been replaced by the New Economic Policy, it was necessary to reorganise the Bolshevik state into a single sovereign entity, so that its legal de jure framework would match its de facto condition. That process would require the liquidation of the many splinter Soviet governments and the restoration of supreme rule to Moscow.

In January 1922, Georgy Chicherin, the then People's Commissar for Foreign Affairs, sent an official inquiry to the authorities of the Russian SFSR about the possibility of representing the legal interests of other republics. Stalin took the position that the Russian SFSR should represent the other republics in the field of foreign policy (including at the Genoa conference in 1922), although there was no legal act that would grant it such powers. The first talks between the authorities of individual republics on the drafting of the treaty began in August 1922.

The line went directly in conflict with both proponents of korenizatsiya and some of the local governments, most notably in Ukraine (where it was opposed by Christian Rakovsky) and Georgia (where the dispute gave rise to the Georgian Affair). Thus, the treaty can be viewed as a compromise between the different groups within the Bolshevik camp to satisfy the aspirations of large minorities (the named examples of Georgia and Ukraine) and to allow for potential expansion. Byelorussia was the smallest republic, but its official languages included Polish and Yiddish in addition to Russian and Belarusian to undermine the authority of the neighbouring Second Polish Republic and to use its sizeable Jewish minority, as well as the Belarusians and Ukrainians in Poland as a future fifth column. At the same time, it created a new centralised federal government in which key functions would clearly be in the hands of Moscow.

=== List of preceding treaties ===
- 30 September 1920, Military and Economical Union Treaty (Russian SFSR and Azerbaijan SSR).
- 28 December 1920, Workers-Peasant Union Treaty (Russian SFSR and Ukrainian SSR).
- 16 January 1921, Workers-Peasant Union Treaty (Russian SFSR and Belarusian SSR).

== Content ==
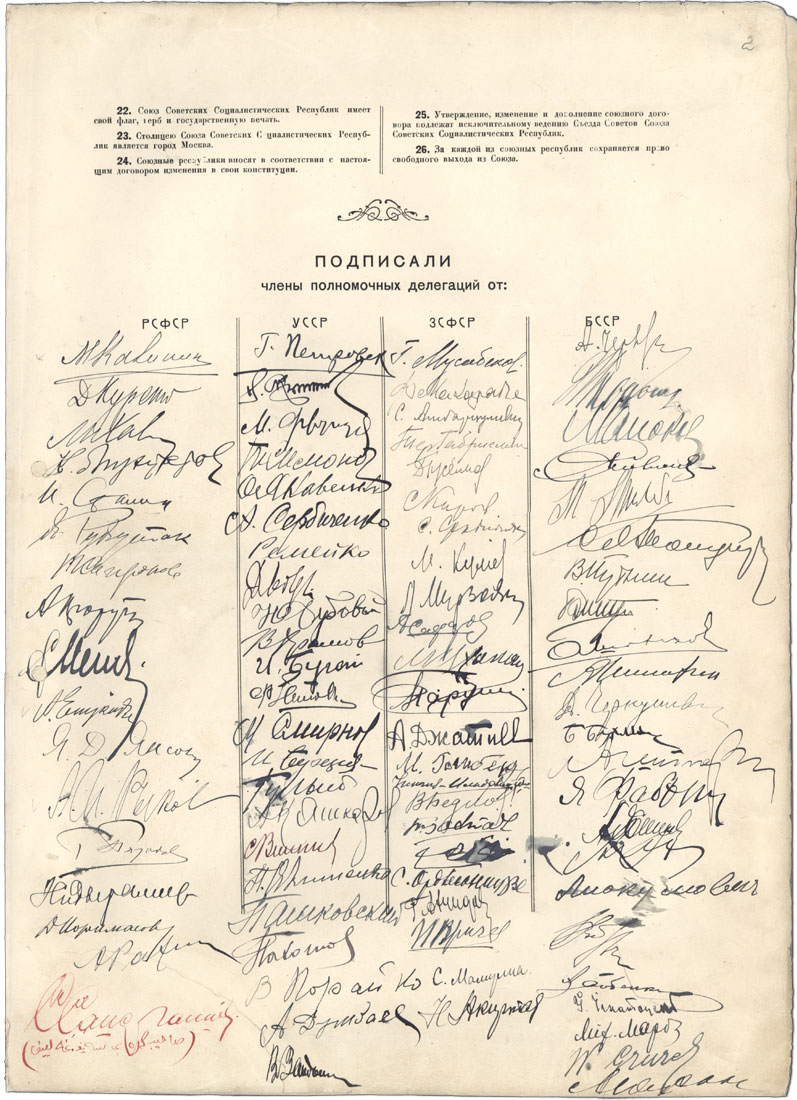
Declaration and Treaty on the Creation of the USSR, 1922, page 3 (with signatures)

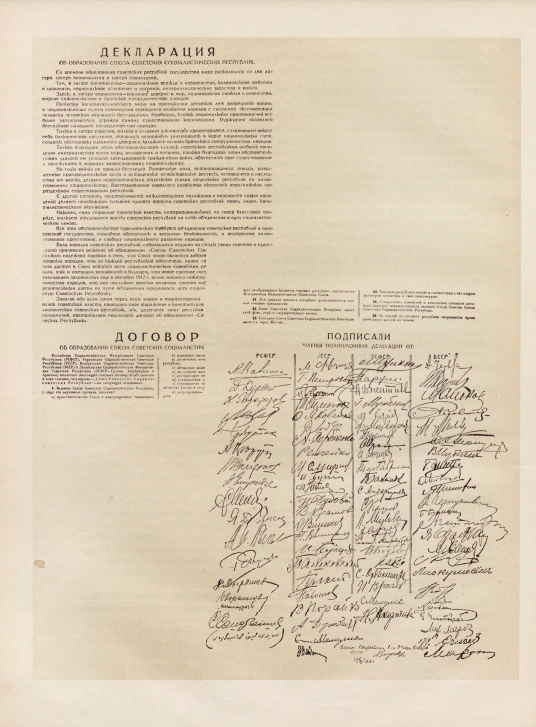
Declaration and Treaty on the Creation of the USSR

The original document included a cover sheet, the declaration, the treaty (containing the preface and 26 articles) and the signatures of the delegations that signed it.

In the cover sheet, the title Union of Soviet Socialist Republics was typed in Russian, French, English and German, as well as the actual words Treaty on the Formation of the Union of Soviet Socialist Republics also in those four languages. It contained the original state emblem of the Soviet Union.

The declaration was written as a reflection on contemporary international relations and why the treaty was necessary. According to the narrative, there are now two distinct camps, an exploiting capitalist with colonialism, chauvinism and social and ethnic inequalities and a "free" socialist one with mutual trust, peace and international cooperation and solidarity. The former sought to destroy the latter, but because of the common good that the latter is based on, the former has failed.

The declaration goes on and lists three factors as to why this Union is a necessary step. First of all, the aftermath of the Civil War left many of the republics' economies destroyed, and rebuilding in the new socialist fashion is proving difficult without closer economic cooperation. Secondly, foreign threats continue to loom over the socialist camp, and its sovereignty requires an alliance for defence. Finally, the ideological factor, that the Soviet rule is internationalist in nature and pushes the working masses to unite in a single socialist family. These three factors justify in uniting in a single state that would guarantee prosperity, security and development.

Finally the declaration then specifies that the resultant Union of Soviet Socialist Republics is one that is created on free will of the peoples, that its purpose follows the ideals of the October Revolution, that each and every socialist republic has the right to join and leave the Union at its own will, and hinting at the Soviet foreign policy of socialist irredentism (see World revolution), finishes stating that the treaty ...will serve a decisive step on the path of unification of all workers into a "World Socialist Soviet Republic".

Following the declaration, is the treaty itself consisting of a preface and 26 articles.

- In the preface it is fixed that the Russian Soviet Federative Socialist Republic, the Ukrainian Socialist Soviet Republic, the Byelorussian Socialist Soviet Republic and the Transcaucasian Socialist Federative Soviet Republic (containing Georgia, Azerbaijan and Armenia) acting in free will, agree to form a single Union of Soviet Socialist Republics, that is governed on articles listed in the treaty.
- Article 1 lists the competency of the responsibilities that the Union's authorities would contain. These include all foreign affairs; international treaties; change in external borders; expansion of the Union by accepting new republics; declaring war and agreeing to peace; foreign and domestic trade; authority over economic development; creating unified postal and transport services; the armed forces; internal migration; creation of single judiciary, education and healthcare services as well as unifying all units of measurement. All of the above would be thus explicitly controlled directly by the Union's authority. Moreover, the final clause explicitly listed, that the Union's authorities could now overturn acts of all Republics' authorities (be it Congresses of Soviets, Soviets of People's Commissars or Central Executive Committees) that were deemed in violation with regard to this Treaty.
- Articles 2–10 determined the structure of supreme authorities of the Union. The legislative authority, according to the treaty, was the Congress of Soviets of the Soviet Union and between the congresses, this was to be carried out by the Central Executive Committee of the Soviet Union (TsIK) (2). The delegates to the Congress are to be elected by local Soviets represented by one elected representative from 25,000 voters in urban areas and one per 125,000 voters in rural areas (3). The Congress delegates would be elected by local Guberniya Soviets, rather than Republican ones (4). The congresses would be held annually or may be summoned by requests of at least two Republics' or the Union's TsIK (5). The TsIK would be the main body to carry out executive functions between the congresses. This TsiK was a 371-person body, whose members were proportionally represented to the population of the Union, and elected by the Congress (6). The Union TsIK would meet four times per annum on a regular basis, whilst irregular sessions can be summoned on demand by the Union government (the Council of People's Commissars) or by one of the constituent Republics (7). The Congress and the TsIK would be held in the capitals of the Union Republics in the order that would be decided by TsIK's Presidium (8). The latter was to be appointed by TsIK, that would be the supreme power organ between its sessions (9). This Presidium would consist of nineteen members, with four chairmen, each representing the four republics (10). The Presidium also had the authority to summon an irregular session of TsIK.
- Article 11 appointed the executive authority, the Council of People's Commissars (SNK). The council's members were appointed by TsIK, and included ten portfolios (commissariats) as well as a chairmen and his deputies.
- Article 12 specified the functions of the Supreme Court of the Soviet Union (under control of TsIK) and the secret police, the OGPU (under control of the SNK, and the OGPU chairman was to be a participant of the SNK with advisory vote). The creation of these two bodies was justified as measures to overcome criminal and counter-revolutionary elements in that very article.
- Articles 13–17 specified the framework on the legal proceedings between the Union's supreme bodies (the TsIK and the SNK) and those of each republic. All of the decrees by Union's SNK were effective in every republic (13). Also confirmed, was the multilingual aspect of the Union, specifying that all of the Union's decrees are to printed in the official language of each constituent republic (Russian, Ukrainian, Belarusian, Georgian, Armenian and Turkic (i.e. Azerbaijani)) (14). It was specified that the Union's SNK resolution may only be overruled by the Union's TsIK or its Presidium (15), and if a republican TsIK chooses to protest the resolution or a decree of the Union's TsIK, the protest itself does not halt the implementation of the document (16). The latter is only possible if there are obvious violations with existing laws, and in such cases, the republic must immediately notify the Union's SNK and the relevant commissariat (17).
- Article 18 listed the authorities that would be retained by the Republics and specified their respective Councils of People's Commissars, each to have a chairman, his deputies, eleven portfolios and representatives with advisory votes of several Union-level commissariats, in particular foreign affairs, defence, foreign trade, transport and logistics.
- At the same time article 19 specified that republican-level organs, the Supreme Soviet of the National Economy (whose chairman was to also have a full seat in the relevant republican SNK), the commissariats for food supply, finance and labour, as well as the Soviet inspection (the Rabkrin) though subjugated to the Republican authorities, their activities were to be regulated by the Union's TsIK.
- Article 20 discussed that the budgets of the Republics would form the Union's budget and that all expenses and spendings by the Republics would be determined by the Union's TsIK. Moreover, the latter would also determine the share of profits, if any, that each Republic would receive.
- Articles 21–23 created a single Soviet citizenship (21), state symbolism (flag, national anthem and a coat of arms – 22), and specified the Union's capital in Moscow (23).
- Article 24 demanded that the republics amended their constitutions with regard to the treaty.
- Article 25 specified that any amendments, additions or changes to the treaty may be done only by the Union's Congress of Soviets.
- Article 26 affirmed the clause in the declaration where each republic has the right to leave the Union.

== Signatories ==
- RSFSR delegation (19): Mikhail Kalinin, Dmitry Kursky, Joseph Stalin, Jānis Rudzutaks, Avel Yenukidze, Ekabs Jansons, Alexei Rykov, Georgy Pyatakov, Nariman Narimanov, Sahib-Garey Said-Galiev, A.Dushbaev
- UkrSSR delegation (23): Grigory Petrovsky, Aleksandr Serbichenko, Aleksandr Remeiko, I.Bugai, M.Smirnov, Konstantin Guly, Ivan Klimenko, Pashkovsky, Nikolay Pakhomov, Vasyl Poraiko, V.Vetoshkin, K.Manuilsky
- TSFSR delegation (27): Gazanfar Musabekov, Filipp Makharadze, Sargis Hambardzumyan, Sahak Ter-Gabrielyan, Sergei Kirov, M.Kuliev, Levon Mirzoyan, Aleksandr Dzhatiev
- BSSR delegation (17): Alexander Chervyakov, Waclaw Bogucki, Jānis Fabriciuss, Liokumovich
  - Note: listed are names signatures of which were recognized; in parentheses is a total number of representatives

== Immediate aftermath ==
=== Politics ===
Initially, the treaty did little to alter the major political spectrum. Most of the governing positions of the RSFSR's supreme organs were automatically transferred to those of the USSR. For example, Lenin's position as chairman of RSFSR's Council of People's Commissars (SNK), which he held since the Revolution, would now to be transformed as the Chairman of the Union's SNK. However, as Lenin remained ill from the stroke, both of his chairs would be occupied by Alexei Rykov as acting head of the government.

Joseph Stalin's position as General Secretary of the Communist Party was also unchanged. However, the party's position was. Prior to the treaty, the Russian Communist Party (Bolsheviks) (RKP(b)) had its own bureaus to oversee activities in distant regions such as the Turkestani Bureau, the Transcaucasian Bureau etc. After the Treaty, the party was reorganised as the All-Union Communist Party (bolsheviks) (VKP(b) – V for Vsesoyuznaya, the All-Union). Although the republics' parties remained, Russia's party retained its primus inter pares position but also officially took over as a supreme authority in the USSR.

In Ukraine the treaty was approved by the Seventh All-Ukrainian Congress of Soviets in December 1922 by adopting the Declaration on the creation of the Union of Soviet Socialist Republics and the Statement about Principles of the Constitution of the Union of Soviet Socialist Republics.

==== Central Asia ====
One area in which the Soviet division of power was not resolved during the treaty's signing was Soviet Central Asia, which contained several problems. A major battleground during the Russian Civil War, the region would remain unstable after it. Turkestan had come under Russian control fairly recently, between 1867 and 1885. Moreover, unlike other ethnic borders of the former Russian Empire, which were delimited during the Tsarist days (for example, Transcaucasia lost its feudal administration by the mid-19th century), the Soviet authorities inherited two provinces that were de jure never part of Russia proper, the Emirate of Bukhara and the Khanate of Khiva. During the Russian Civil War, they shared the fate of the other republics, but even there, their special status was preserved, and they were established as the Bukharan and Khorezm People's Soviet Republics. Despite Mikhail Frunze's victories, the conflict was ongoing, and whole provinces were under control of the Basmachi movement in 1922.

To settle the issue, in line with the korenizatsiya policy a massive programme of national delimitation in Central Asia was undertaken. On October 27, 1924, TsIK issued a decree where the former Bukharan, Khivan People's Republics as well as the RSFSR's Turkestan were re-organized as the Uzbek SSR and the Turkmen SSR, both of whom became full Union Republics on 13 May 1925. The borders of the new republics matched to an extent the ethno-social, linguistic, and tribal groups inhabiting the regions in question, and Uzbekistan initially also contained a newly formed Tajik Autonomous Soviet Socialist Republic, which would be elevated to a full Union Republic on October 16, 1929, to become the Tajik SSR. Meanwhile, in 1924 the Kara-Kirghiz Autonomous Oblast was carved out of the northeastern part of the former Turkestan, to be upgraded to the level of Autonomous SSR (within the RSFSR) and eventually made a union-level republic in the form of the Kirghiz SSR in 1936, along with the "Kirghiz Autonomous SSR" which became the Kazakh SSR.

=== Soviet Constitution ===
In January 1924, the Second Congress of Soviets of the Soviet Union, that was called in accordance to the treaty ratified the first 1924 Soviet Constitution. The constitution's text is essentially the rewritten and expanded treaty. It even contains the same declaration. The treaty had 26 articles, but the constitution had eleven chapters and 72 articles.

Some experts argue that the original Union of Soviet Socialist Republics, ceased to exist as such, upon the adoption of the 1936 Soviet Constitution on 5 December 1936, which greatly altered the internal arrangement and reorganised the Soviet Union from a confederation into a more centralized federal country. Instead of the Congress of Soviets, the new constitution created a permanent parliament, the Supreme Soviet. It also tied together most of the authorities and most significantly affirmed the role of the Communist Party as the "driving force" behind the Soviet Union's working masses.

With regard to the original Treaty, the adoption of the Constitution re-organised the make-up of the Union moving from seven to eleven SSRs. On December 5, 1936, the Transcaucasian SFSR was broken into Armenian, Georgian and Azerbaijani SSRs. The same day, two of RSFSR's autonomies, the Kazakh and the Kirghiz ASSRs, were re-organised as full republics.

== Expansion ==
In a prelude to World War II, several new republics were created as a result of Soviet annexations of other countries. The first was the Karelo-Finnish SSR, ceded by Finland to the USSR after the Soviet invasion of Finland in 1939, which on 31 March 1940 was elevated to a union republic from the Karelian ASSR, previously part of the Russian SFSR.

After the invasion and annexation of the Baltic states in 1940, Lithuania, Latvia and Estonia were transformed into the Lithuanian SSR (July 13), Latvian SSR (July 21) and Estonian SSR (also July 21) and were formally adjoined to the Soviet Union on 3, 5 and 6 August respectively. The final republic was the Moldavian SSR, which merged the large territory of Bessarabia (annexed from Romania) with the Moldavian ASSR, previously part of the Ukrainian SSR.

After World War II, no new republics were established. Instead, the Karello-Finnish SSR was downgraded into an autonomous republic and re-admitted into the Russian SFSR on July 16, 1956.

== Annulment ==
On December 8, 1991, the leaders of the Ukrainian and Byelorussian SSRs, and the Russian SFSR met to agree on the annulment of the 1922 treaty. On 26 December, the Soviet of the Republics, the upper chamber of the Supreme Soviet of the Soviet Union, ratified a relevant resolution, effectively voting the Soviet Union out of existence (the lower chamber, the Soviet of the Union, had been unable to work since 12 December, when the recall of the Russian deputies left it without a quorum).

== Post-Soviet discussion about the validity of the treaty ==
The Chairman of the Supreme Soviet of the RSFSR Ruslan Khasbulatov, who signed the decree on the denunciation of the Union Treaty, subsequently stated that the treaty ceased to exist as a state legal document with the adoption of the first Constitution of the USSR in 1924.

There is no consensus among Russian lawyers about the effect of the Union Treaty of 1922 at the time of the Soviet Union's break-up. Doctor of Law Pyotr Kremnev believes that the treaty had an international legal character and was in effect from the moment of its adoption until the collapse of the USSR in 1991. A diametrically opposite position is taken by Dmitry Lukashevich, candidate of legal sciences, who considers the Union Treaty of 1922 to be a constituent act of domestic legal nature. He makes the following arguments: "The treaty on the formation of the USSR in 1922 was not an international legal, but a constituent act of a domestic nature. The function of this treaty is only to establish the state, and not to legitimize its existence. Just as it is impossible to liquidate a legal entity by terminating the agreement on its establishment or to liquidate an entire state by simply denouncing the treaty establishing it. At the same time, the treaty was not, in the proper sense, an agreement on the creation of a state, but was only a part of the future Constitution [1924], and, finally, the Treaty on the formation of the USSR in 1922 was originally conceived as part of this constitution being developed, and therefore, it was simply impossible to denounce "or otherwise terminate it in December 1991."

On March 15, 1996, the State Duma of the Russian Federation expressed its legal position in relation to the decision of the Supreme Soviet of the RSFSR in "The denunciation of the Treaty establishing the Soviet Union" as the wrongful, unconstitutional act passed by a grave violation of the Constitution of the RSFSR, the norms of international law and then in force legislation.

== Timeline ==
- December 21, 1922 – Treaty signed.
- December 30, 1922 – Treaty ratified.
- October 27, 1924 – Uzbek and Turkmen populated regions of the Turkestan ASSR (previously of RSFSR) and liquidated republics of Bukhara and Khorezm, that supported Basmachi movement, elevated into union republics.
- October 16, 1929 – Tajik SSR created from the Tajik ASSR (part of the Uzbek SSR in 1924–1929).
- December 5, 1936 – Adoption of the 1936 Constitution:
  - Split of the Transcaucasian SFSR into its former federal subjects Armenian, Georgian and Azerbaijani SSRs.
  - Elevation of the RSFSR-administered autonomous republics of Kazakh and Kirgiz people into the union republics of Kazakh and Kirghiz people.
- March 31, 1940 – In the aftermath of the Winter War, the Karelian ASSR and the territories ceded by Finland (Finnish Democratic Republic) were merged into the Karelo-Finnish SSR.
- August 1940 – Occupation of the Baltic states by the USSR followed by their annexation:
  - August 3, 1940 – Lithuanian SSR was incorporated into the USSR.
  - August 5, 1940 – Latvian SSR was incorporated into the USSR.
  - August 6, 1940 – Estonian SSR was incorporated into the USSR.
- August 24, 1940 – Moldavian SSR created from the Ukrainian administered Moldavian ASSR and annexed Romanian territory of Bessarabia.
- July 16, 1956 – Karelo-Finnish SSR downgraded into an autonomous republic and re-annexed by RSFSR, while RSFSR also kept the annexed Finnish territories during the Finnish–Soviet conflicts (so called Winter and Continuation wars).
- 1988–1991 – the Novo-Ogorevo process (failed reformation into the Union of Sovereign States) and "Parade of sovereignties" as wider factors contributing to the dissolution of the Soviet Union
  - March 14, 1990 – removal of exclusive rights of the Communist Party of the Soviet Union (CPSU) from the constitution (process of "demokratizatsiya")
  - June 12, 1990 – ratification of the Declaration of State Sovereignty of the Russian Soviet Federative Socialist Republic from the Soviet Union by the Congress of People's Deputies of Russia, while membership in the United Nations it reserved of the Soviet Union; the ratification of the declaration is celebrated as the Russia Day since 1992
- August 19–22, 1991 – the August Coup (a failed coup attempt) by members the conservative faction of the CPSU to stop the Novo-Ogorevo process, banning of the CPSU as the party that led to the coup, many republics declare independence as the aftermath
- December 8, 1991 – Treaty termination agreed by three of the four founding republics as the fourth founding member, the Transcaucasian Socialist Federative Soviet Republic, was dissolved back in 1936.
- December 21, 1991 – Another declaration is signed with the rest of the former Union (except Georgia and the Baltic states), terminating the Treaty.
- December 25, 1991 – President Gorbachev resigns and declares his office extinct. After his televised speech ends, the Soviet flag is lowered from the Moscow Kremlin, after which it is replaced by the flag of Russia.
- December 26, 1991 – Treaty terminated.

== See also ==
- New Union Treaty
- Bibliography of the Russian Revolution and Civil War
- Succession, continuity and legacy of the Soviet Union
