= Second All-Union Congress of Soviets =

The Second All-Union Congress of Soviets was held in Moscow from January 26 to February 2, 1924. On January 27 and 28, meetings were not held in connection with the funeral of Vladimir Lenin. 2124 delegates took part in the congress, 1540 of them with a decisive vote.

== Day order ==
Papers:

- On the Constitution (Basic Law) of the Soviet Union;
- The Perpetuation of the Memory of Vladimir Lenin;
- On the Activities of the Soviet Government;
- On the Budget of the Soviet Union;
- On the Establishment of the Central Agricultural Bank.

== Congress decisions ==
=== Elected at the congress ===
- Second All-Union Central Executive Committee (bicameral: Soviet of the Union and Soviet of Nationalities)

=== Documents accepted ===
- First Constitution of the Soviet Union
- Decisions:
  - On the Publication of the Works of Lenin
  - On Renaming the City of Petrograd to the City of Leningrad
  - On the Establishment of the Day of Mourning
  - On the Construction of the Mausoleum of Lenin on Red Square in Moscow

The Second Congress formalized the basic legislation in which the Soviet Union was built upon when it approved the 1924 Constitution, the first of the Soviet Union.
