= First All-Union Congress of Soviets =

Congress of representatives of the Soviet Union

Second All-Union Congress of Soviets	→
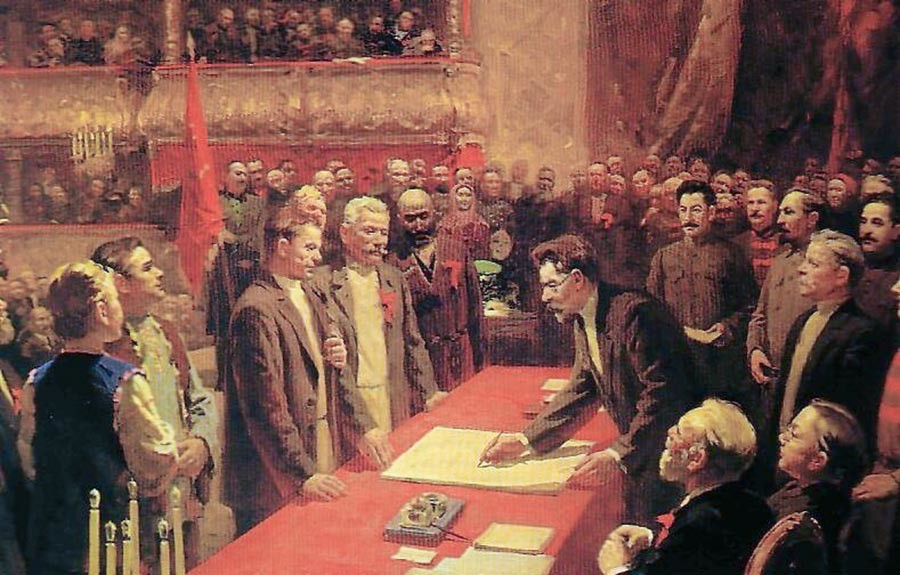
- Stepan Dudnik. Signing an Agreement on the Formation of the Soviet Union

Overview
- Legislative body: Congress of Soviets of the Soviet Union
- Jurisdiction: Soviet Union
- Meeting place: Bolshoi Theatre
- Term: December 30, 1922
- Chairman of the Congress: Mikhail Kalinin
- Congress Secretary: Avel Yenukidze
- Party control: Russian Communist Party (Bolsheviks)

The First All-Union Congress of Soviets (Russian: I Всесоюзный съезд Советов, IPA: [ˈpʲervɨj fsʲɪsɐˈjuznɨj sjest sɐˈvʲetəf]) was a congress of representatives of Soviets of workers, peasants and Red Army deputies, held on December 30, 1922, in Moscow. The congress was attended by 2,215 delegates (1,727 from the Russian Socialist Federative Soviet Republic, 364 from the Ukrainian Socialist Soviet Republic, 91 from the Transcaucasian Socialist Federative Soviet Republic, and 33 from the Belarusian Socialist Soviet Republic). Kalinin was elected chairman of the congress, but Vladimir Lenin, who was not present at the congress due to illness, was elected honorary chairman of the congress. Over 90% of the delegates were members of the Russian Communist Party; two were left-wing social federalists of the Caucasus, one was an anarchist, and two were members of the Jewish Social Democratic Party.

The congress approved the Declaration and the Treaty on the Formation of a New State – the Union of Soviet Socialist Republics. Four states have united in the Soviet Union: Russian Socialist Federative Soviet Republic, Ukrainian Socialist Soviet Republic, Belarusian Socialist Soviet Republic, Transcaucasian Socialist Federative Soviet Republic. In addition, the congress elected the Central Executive Committee of the Soviet Union.

== Order of the day ==
1. Consideration of the Declaration on the Formation of the Soviet Union. Speaker – Joseph Stalin.
2. Consideration of the Treaty on the Formation of the Soviet Union. Speaker – Joseph Stalin.
3. Election of the Central Executive Committee of the Soviet Union. Speaker – Avel Yenukidze.

== Congress decisions ==
=== Elected at the congress ===
- First All-Union Central Executive Committee (unicameral, totaling 371 members)

=== Accepted documents ===
- Greetings to Comrade Vladimir Lenin, Honorary Chairman of the First Congress of Soviets of the Soviet Union
- Declaration on the Formation of the Soviet Union
- Treaty on the Formation of the Soviet Union
- Decisions:

1. On Approval of the Declaration and Treaty on the Formation of the Soviet Union
2. About the Foundation of the House of the Soviet Union
3. On the Establishment of the Central People's Institute of Agriculture
4. On the Celebration of the Foundation Day of the Union of Soviet Socialist Republics

== Main outcome of the congress ==
The Congress made official the formal foundation of the Union of Soviet Socialist Republics. It was this congress that formalized its foundation by the passage of the Union Treaty, which would serve as a provisional constitution until the passage of a proper constitution for the new federal republic by the Congress.

== Sources ==
- History of the Communist Party of the Soviet Union. Volume 4, Book 1 – Moscow, 1970 – Pages 196–210
- Vladimir Lenin. To the Question of Nationalities or "Autonomy" / Vladimir Lenin // Complete Works: in 55 Volumes. Volume 45 / Vladimir Lenin; Institute of Marxism–Leninism at the Central Committee of the Communist Party of the Soviet Union – 5th Edition – Moscow: Publishing House of Political Literature of the Central Committee of the Communist Party of the Soviet Union, 1970 – Pages 356–362 – 26, 729 Pages
- First Congress of Soviets of the Union of Soviet Socialist Republics: Verbatim Report: December 30, 1922 / Union of Soviet Socialist Republics – Moscow: Publishing House of the Central Executive Committee of the Soviet Union, 1923 – 24 Pages
- Congresses of Soviets of the Soviet Union, Union and Autonomous Soviet Socialist Republics: Collection of Documents. Volume 3 / Academy of Sciences of the Soviet Union, Institute of Law – Moscow, 1960 – 398 Pages
- Sophia Yakubovskaya. The Development of the Soviet Union as a Union State: 1922–1936 / Sophia Yakubovskaya; Academy of Sciences of the Soviet Union, Institute of History of the Soviet Union – Moscow: Science, 1972 – 230 Pages
