= Ivan Akulov =

Russian Old Bolshevik revolutionary, Soviet official and statesman

- Иван Акулов
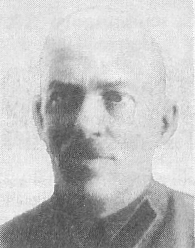

Procurator General of the Soviet Union
- In office 20 June 1933 – 3 March 1935
- Premier: Vyacheslav Molotov
- Preceded by: Pyotr Krasikov
- Succeeded by: Andrey Vyshinsky

Personal details
- Born: 24 April 1888 Saint Petersburg, Russian Empire
- Died: 30 October 1937 (aged 49) Moscow, Russian SFSR, Soviet Union
- Party: RSDLP (1902–1903); RSDLP (Bolsheviks) (1903–1918); Russian Communist Party (1918–1937)

Ivan Alekseyevich Akulov (Russian: Иван Алексеевич Акулов; 24 April [O.S. 12 April] 1888 – 30 October 1937) was a leading Russian Old Bolshevik revolutionary, Soviet official and statesman, who for a few months was nominally second in command of the political police, the OGPU.

== Career ==
Akulov was born in St Petersburg, son a small trader. He joined the revolutionaries as a teenager, during the 1905 revolution and joined the Bolshevik faction of the Russian Social Democratic Labour Party in 1907. In 1912, he was one of the organisers of one of the largest demonstrations ever staged in St Petersburg during the reign of the Tsars, in which 60,000 factory workers participated. After the Bolshevik revolution in November 1917, he was posted to Yekaterinburg, as secretary of the Ural provincial party committee of the Russian Communist Party, and from there played a leading role in establishing communist rule in Siberia, and Central Asia, where he was secretary of the Kyrgyr communist party in 1920–21. He was a party secretary in Crimea, 1921–22, chairman of the Donets miners' union, 1922–27, and chairman of the Ukraine trade union council, 1927–1931.

In July 1931, Akulov was suddenly transferred to Moscow, as first deputy chairman of the OGPU. The OGPU was nominally headed by the terminally ill Vyacheslav Menzhinsky. Its effective head was Genrikh Yagoda, who was relegated to the post of second deputy chairman. This appears to have been a first attempt by Joseph Stalin to wrest control of the police from Yagoda, whom he did not trust. The attempt did not work: as one senior officer said after Yagoda had been ousted, five years later, "the entire party organisation in the OGPU was devoted to sabotaging Akulov." In October 1932, Akulov returned to Ukraine, as First Secretary of the Donets party committee.

In 1933, Akulov was recalled to Moscow, as USSR Prosecutor General, with Nikolai Krylenko and Andrei Vyshinsky as his deputies, in what may have been a move to build up the prosecutors' office as a counterweight to the OGPU, now that it was back under Yagoda's control. He demonstrated his loyalty to Stalin at a session of the Central Committee in January 1933, by declaring: "Stalin's policy is our policy, the policy of the entire party, it is the policy not only of the proletarian revolution in our country but of the proletarian revolution in the world. That's what Stalin's policy is all about.". But after the assassination of Sergei Kirov, unlike his two deputies, Akulov objected when Stalin proposed to pin the murder on the Old Bolsheviks, Zinoviev and Kamenev. In June 1935, he was appointed to succeed Avel Yenukidze as secretary of the Central Executive Committee (CEC) of the soviets, putting him in charge of security in the Kremlin, while Vyshinsky replaced him as prosecutor general.

In 1937, after Akulov had a fall while skating, and suffered a near fatal concussion, Stalin ordered that surgeons be brought from abroad to save his life. Two of his former deputies, Vyshinsky and Grigori Roginsky, sent messages wishing him a speedy recover. He returned to work, only to be arrested on 23 July 1937. On hearing about his arrest, one of his colleagues Valentin Trifonov, protested to the chairman of the Central Executive Committee, Mikhail Kalinin who took up the case with Stalin, and was bluntly told: "You always were a liberal." Akulov confessed under torture to having been a Trotskyite. After he was sentenced to death, he told Roginsky "You know I'm not guilty." Roginsky replied with a stream of abuse.

Akulov was accused of having been a Trotskyist since 1927, and of being involved in a 'fascist military conspiracy' with the Red Army commander Iona Yakir. His name was on a death list signed by Stalin, Molotov, Kaganovich, and Voroshilov on 21 October 1937. He admitted the charges while interrogation, probably under torture, but denied them during his trial on 29 October 1937. He was shot on 30 October 1937.

Akulov was 'rehabilitated' in December 1954.

== Commemoration ==
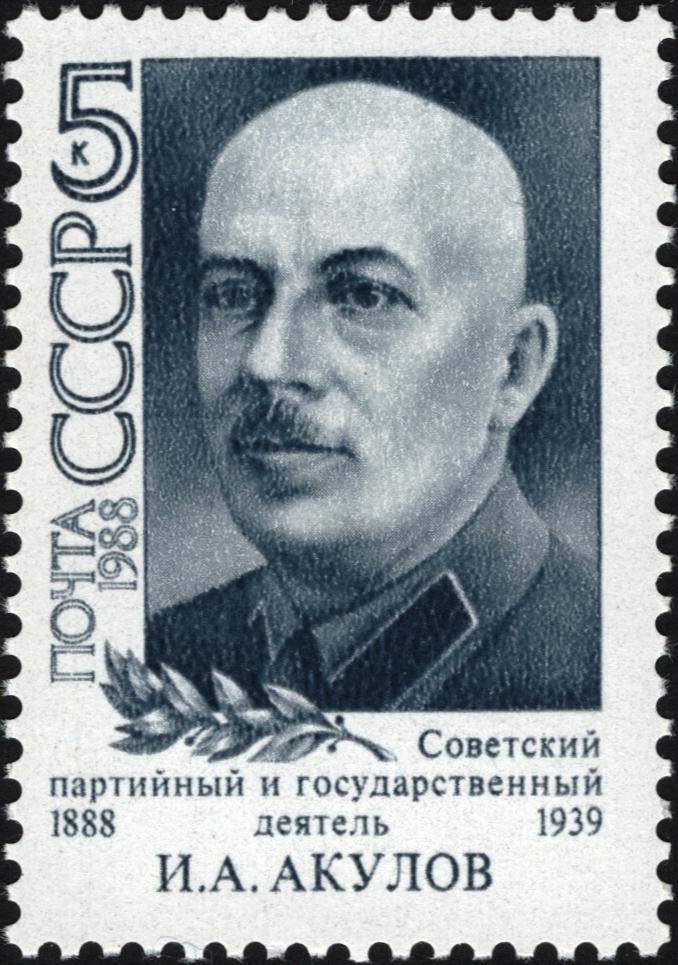
The Soviet postage stamp commemorating the centenary of I. A. Akulov’s birth

In 1988, the USSR issued a postage stamp dedicated to Akulov on the occasion of the 100th anniversary of his birth.

A street in Vyborg is also named in his honor.

== Bibliography ==
- Medvedev, Roy (1976). Let History Judge, The Origins and Consequences of Stalinism. Nottingham: Spokesman.
