= 1936 Constitution of the Soviet Union =

Congress of Soviets of the Soviet Union
- Long title: Constitution of the Union of Soviet Socialist Republics
- Territorial extent: Soviet Union
- Enacted by: Congress of Soviets of the Soviet Union
- Signed by: Joseph Stalin
- Effective: 5 December 1936; 89 years ago
- Repealed: 7 October 1977; 49 years ago

Repeals
- 1924 Constitution of the Soviet Union

Repealed by
- 1977 Constitution of the Soviet Union
- Status: Repealed

The 1936 Constitution of the Soviet Union, also known as the Stalin Constitution, was the basic law of the USSR adopted on 5 December 1936.

The 1936 Constitution was the second constitution of the Soviet Union and replaced the 1924 Constitution, with 5 December being celebrated annually as Soviet Constitution Day from its adoption by the Congress of Soviets. This date was considered the "second foundational moment" of the USSR, after the October Revolution in 1917.

The 1936 Constitution redesigned the government of the Soviet Union, expanded all manner of rights and freedoms, and spelled out a number of democratic procedures. The Congress of Soviets replaced itself with the Supreme Soviet, which amended the 1936 Constitution in 1944.

The 1936 Constitution was the longest surviving constitution of the Soviet Union, and many Eastern Bloc countries later adopted constitutions that were closely modeled on it. It was replaced by the 1977 Constitution of the Soviet Union ("Brezhnev Constitution") on 7 October 1977.

== Basic provisions ==
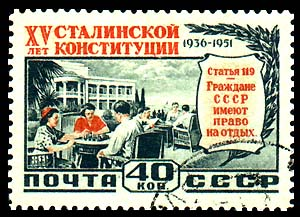
1951 postage stamp marking the 15th anniversary of the Soviet Constitution, illustrating the right to recreation

The 1936 Constitution repealed restrictions on voting, abolishing the lishentsy category of people, and added universal direct suffrage and the right to work to rights guaranteed by the previous constitution. In addition, the 1936 Constitution recognized collective social and economic rights including the rights to work, rest and leisure, health protection, care in old age and sickness, housing, education and cultural benefits. The 1936 Constitution also provided for the direct election of all government bodies and their reorganization into a single, uniform system.

Article 122 states that "women in the U.S.S.R. are accorded equal rights with men in all spheres of economic, state, cultural, social and political life." Specific measures on women included state protection of the interests of mother and child, prematernity and maternity leave with full pay, and the provision of maternity homes, nurseries, and kindergartens.

Article 123 establishes equality of rights for all citizens "irrespective of their nationality or race, in all spheres of economic, state, cultural, social, and political life." Advocacy of racial or national exclusiveness, or hatred or contempt, or restrictions of rights and privileges on account of nationality, were to be punished by law.

== Freedom of religion and speech ==
Article 124 of the constitution guaranteed freedom of religion, including separation of (1) church and state, and (2) school from church. The reasoning of the Article 124 is framed in terms of ensuring "to citizens freedom of conscience ... Freedom of religious worship and freedom of anti-religious propaganda is recognized for all citizens." Stalin included Article 124 in the face of stiff opposition, and it eventually led to rapprochement with the Russian Orthodox Church before and during World War 2. The new constitution re-enfranchised certain religious people who had been specifically disenfranchised under the previous constitution. The article resulted in members of the Russian Orthodox Church petitioning to reopen closed churches, gain access to jobs that had been closed to them as religious figures, and the attempt to run religious candidates in the 1937 elections.

Article 125 of the constitution guaranteed freedom of speech of the press and freedom of assembly.

== Leading role of Communist Party ==
The 1936 constitution specifically mentioned the role of the ruling All-Union Communist Party (Bolsheviks) for the first time. Article 126 stated that the Party was the "vanguard of the working people in their struggle to strengthen and develop the socialist system and representing the leading core of all organizations of the working people, both public and state". This provision was used to justify banning all other parties from functioning in the Soviet Union and legalizing the one-party state.

== Nomenclature changes ==
The 1936 Constitution replaced the Congress of Soviets of the Soviet Union with the Supreme Soviet of the Soviet Union. Unlike its unicameral predecessor, the Supreme Soviet contained two chambers: the Soviet of the Union and the Soviet of Nationalities. The constitution empowered the Supreme Soviet to elect commissars, which performed most of the Supreme Soviet's work. The Central Executive Committee of the Congress of Soviets was replaced by the Presidium of the Supreme Soviet which, much like its predecessor, exercised the full powers of the Supreme Soviet between sessions and had the right to interpret laws. The Chairman of the Presidium of the Supreme Soviet became the titular head of state of the Soviet Union. The Council of People's Commissars, known after 1946 as the Council of Ministers, continued to act as the executive arm of the government.

The 1936 Constitution changed the names of all Union Republics, the constituent states of the Soviet Union, transposing the second word "socialist" and third word "soviet" (or equivalent e.g. "radianska" in Ukrainian). Republics were named after the primary nationality and followed by "Soviet Socialist Republic" (SSR), except for the Russian Soviet Federative Socialist Republic (RSFSR).

The Transcaucasian Socialist Federative Soviet Republic, one of the four republics to sign the Treaty on the Creation of the USSR, was dissolved and its constituent republics, the Georgian Soviet Socialist Republic, Armenian Soviet Socialist Republic and Azerbaijani Soviet Socialist Republic, were elevated to union republics individually.

== Drafting ==
The 1936 Constitution was written by a special commission of 31 members which General Secretary Joseph Stalin chaired. Those who participated included (among others) Andrey Vyshinsky, Andrei Zhdanov, Maxim Litvinov, Kliment Voroshilov, Vyacheslav Molotov, Lazar Kaganovich, Nikolai Bukharin, and Karl Radek, though the latter two had less active input.

The 1936 Constitution introduced Stalin's view of a "socialist legal culture" proposed to increase regularity and predictability of legal outcomes and institutionalize the results of industrialization and collectivization.

== Soviet reactions ==
The 1936 Constitution enumerated economic rights not included in constitutions in the Western democracies. The constitution was presented as a personal triumph for Stalin, who on this occasion was described by Pravda as "genius of the new world, the wisest man of the epoch, the great leader of communism".

According to J. Arch Getty, "Many who lauded Stalin's Soviet Union as the most democratic country on earth lived to regret their words. After all, the Soviet Constitution of 1936 was adopted on the eve of the Great Terror of the late 1930s; the "thoroughly democratic" elections to the first Supreme Soviet permitted only uncontested candidates and took place at the height of the savage violence in 1937. The civil rights, personal freedoms, and democratic forms promised in the Stalin constitution were trampled almost immediately and remained dead letters until long after Stalin's death."

== 1944 amendments ==
The 1944 amendments to the 1936 Constitution established separate branches of the Red Army for each Soviet Republic, and also established Republic-level commissariats for foreign affairs and defense, allowing them to be recognized as sovereign states in international law. This allowed for two Soviet Republics, Ukraine and Byelorussia, to join the United Nations General Assembly as founding members in 1945.

== Criticism ==
Many historians and contemporary observers have been dismissive of the 1936 constitution as a propaganda document. Leonard Schapiro, for example, wrote in 1971: "The decision to alter the electoral system from indirect to direct election, from a limited to a universal franchise, and from open to secret voting, was a measure of the confidence of the party in its ability to ensure the return of candidates of its own choice without the restrictions formerly considered necessary"; and that "a careful scrutiny of the draft of the new constitution showed that it left the party's supreme position unimpaired, and was therefore worthless as a guarantee of individual rights".

Isaac Deutscher called it "a veil of liberal phrases and premises over the guillotine in the background," while Hannah Arendt observed that it was hailed as the ending of the Soviet Union's "revolutionary period", but was immediately followed by the country's most intense purges in its history, the Great Purge in which many of the constitution's organizers and draftees — such as Yakov Yakovlev, Aleksei Stetskii, Boris Markovich Tal', Vlas Chubar, Karl Radek, Nikolai Bukharin, and Ivan Akulov — were imprisoned or executed as counterrevolutionaries shortly after their work was complete.

By way of contrast, historian and conservative commentator on Soviet affairs William Henry Chamberlin, while allowing that much of the 1936 constitution remained dead letter, asserted there was one subtle yet important change connected with the document — the abolition of disfranchisement on the basis of class. Chamberlin explained:

"All Soviet citizens, criminals and lunatics excepted, now enjoy the right to vote. This change is important not for political, but for social and moral reasons.... [D]isfranchisement carried with it very serious practical disabilities. The Soviet citizen who could not vote could not go to the university, was excluded from social insurance benefits, found it difficult, sometimes impossible, to obtain state employment in a country where the government is the dispenser of almost all jobs.... The elimination of these social disabilities was a long step towards ending of the class war spirt in Russia, towards the cementing of a sense of genuine national unity under the new regime."

== See also ==
- Bibliography of Stalinism and the Soviet Union § Government
