= Central Executive Committee of the Soviet Union =

Governing body of the USSR, 1922–1938

Central Executive Committee of the USSR Центральный исполнительный комитет СССР
- Soviet Union

Type
- Type: Bicameral

History
- Established: 1922
- Disbanded: 1938
- Preceded by: None (creation of a new state) (Note: Per statement of the First All-Union Congress of Soviets)
- Succeeded by: Presidium of the Supreme Soviet of the Soviet Union

Elections
- Soviet of the Union voting system: Indirect election; elected by the All-Union Congress of Soviets
- Soviet of Nationalities voting system: Indirect election; elected by the union and autonomous republics and approved by the All-Union Congress of Soviets

Meeting place
- Kremlin Senate

The Central Executive Committee of the USSR (Russian: Центральный исполнительный комитет СССР, IPA: [tsɨnˈtralʲnɨj ɪspɐɫˈnʲitʲɪlʲnɨj kəmʲɪˈtʲet ɛsɛsɛsˈɛr]), which may be abbreviated as the CEC (Russian: ЦИК, IPA: [tsɨk]), (Note: Furthermore, some authors may use the term All-Union Central Executive Committee) was the supreme governing body of the USSR in between sessions of the All-Union Congress of Soviets from 1922 to 1938. The Central Executive Committee elected the Presidium, (Note: Not to be confused with the Presidium of the Supreme Soviet) which, like its parent body, was the delegated governing authority when the other was not in session. Although the Presidium had a group of collective chairmen from each republic, the chairman from the Russian SFSR was often recognized as first among equals and was considered as the ceremonial head of state of the USSR. (Note: During its existence, there was only one chairman from the Russian SFSR: Mikhail Kalinin) The Central Executive Committee also elected the Council of People's Commissars which was its executive and administrative organ. The Central Executive Committee of the USSR was established in 1922 by the First All-Union Congress of Soviets, and was replaced by the Presidium of the Supreme Soviet in 1938.

Initially the committee had four co-chairs, after 1925 there were seven. The Kazakh and Kirghiz SSRs were created in 1936 and did not have co-chairs in the committee, as it dissolved just two years later.

== Description ==
The Central Executive Committee was created with the adoption of the Treaty on the Creation of the USSR in December 1922. The Central Executive Committee was elected by the Congress of Soviets to govern on its behalf whenever the Congress of Soviets was not in session. The Central Executive Committee was convened by the Presidium of the Central Executive Committee, which was elected by the Central Executive Committee to govern on its behalf whenever it was not in session.

The Central Executive Committee of the USSR should not be confused with the Central Executive Committees that operated in each of the Soviet Union's constituent republics. These were:

- The All-Russian Central Executive Committee in the RSFSR
- The All-Byelorussian Central Executive Committee in the Byelorussian SSR
- The All-Ukrainian Central Executive Committee in the Ukrainian SSR
- The All-Caucasian Central Executive Committee of the Transacaucasian SFSR

== List of the Central Executive Committees of the Soviet Union ==
- Central Executive Committee of the First Congress of Soviets (elected on 30 December 1922)
  - 1st session (Moscow) – 30 December 1922
  - 2nd session (Moscow) – 6 July 1923
  - 3rd session (Moscow) – 6–12 November 1923
- Central Executive Committee of the Second Congress of Soviets (elected on 2 February 1924)
  - 1st session (Moscow) – 2 February 1924
  - 2nd session (Moscow) – 17–29 October 1924
  - 3rd session (Tbilisi) – 3–7 March 1925
- Central Executive Committee of the Third Congress of Soviets (elected on 20 May 1925)
  - 1st session (Moscow) – 21 May 1925
  - 2nd session (Moscow) – 12–25 April 1926
  - 3rd session (Moscow) – 14–25 February 1927
- Central Executive Committee of the Fourth Congress of Soviets (elected on 26 April 1927)
  - 1st session (Moscow) – 27 April 1927
  - 2nd session (Leningrad) – 15–20 October 1927
  - 3rd session (Moscow) – 11–21 April 1928
  - 4th session (Moscow) – 3–15 December 1928
- Central Executive Committee of the Fifth Congress of Soviets (elected on 28 May 1929)
  - 1st session (Moscow) – 29 May 1929
  - 2nd session (Moscow) – 29 November – 8 December 1929
  - 3rd session (Moscow) – 4–12 January 1931
- Central Executive Committee of the Sixth Congress of Soviets (elected on 17 March 1931)
  - 1st session (Moscow) – 18 March 1931
  - 2nd session (Moscow) – 22–28 December 1931
  - 3rd session (Moscow) – 23–30 January 1933
  - 4th session (Moscow) – 28 December 1933 – 4 January 1934
- Central Executive Committee of the Seventh Congress of Soviets (elected on 6 February 1935)
  - 1st session (Moscow) – 7–8 February 1935
  - 2nd session (Moscow) – 10–17 January 1936
  - 3rd session (Moscow) – 11–14 January 1937
  - 4th session (Moscow) – 7–9 July 1937

== Leadership ==
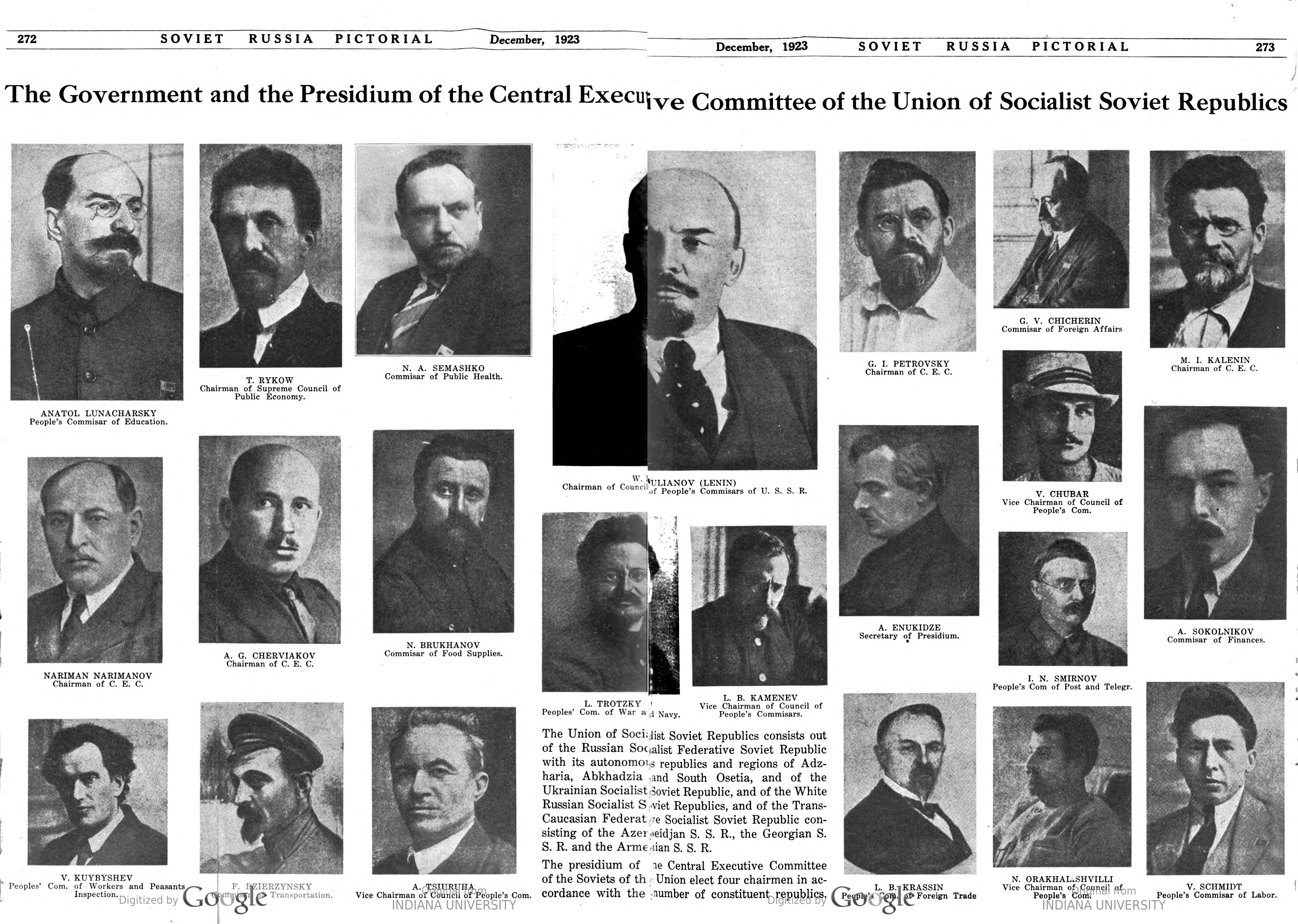
Soviet Russia Pictorial, December 1923

=== Chairmen ===
The Presidium of the Central Executive Committee consisted of 21 members and included the President of the Soviet of the Union and the Soviet of Nationalities. A representative of each constituent republic (initially four) was elected one of the directors of the presidium.

- Russian Soviet Federative Socialist Republic: Mikhail Kalinin (December 30, 1922 – January 12, 1938)
- Ukrainian Soviet Socialist Republic: Grigory Petrovsky (December 30, 1922 – January 12, 1938)
- Byelorussian Soviet Socialist Republic: Alexander Chervyakov (December 30, 1922 – June 16, 1937)
- Transcaucasian Socialist Federative Soviet Republic:
  - Nariman Narimanov (December 30, 1922 – March 19, 1925)
  - Gazanfar Musabekov (May 21, 1925 – June 1937)

As more entities (usually previously Autonomous Soviet Socialist Republics) were promoted to the status of constituent republics of the USSR, they received representation among the directors of the Presidium:

- Uzbek Soviet Socialist Republic (from 1924): Fayzulla Khodzhayev (May 21, 1925 – June 17, 1937)
- Turkmen Soviet Socialist Republic (from 1925): Nedirbay Aytakov (May 21, 1925 – 21 July 1937)
- Tajik Soviet Socialist Republic (from 1929):
  - Nusratullo Maksum (March 18, 1931 – January 4, 1934)
  - Abdullo Rakhimbayev (January 4, 1934 – September 1937)

=== Presidium secretaries ===
- 1922–1935 Avel Yenukidze
- 1935–1937 Ivan Akulov
- 1937–1938 Aleksandr Gorkin

=== Soviet of Nationalities chairmen ===
- 1927–? Mykola Skrypnyk

== Powers ==
The 1924 Soviet Constitution defined the powers of the CEC as:

- Calling of the Congresses of Soviets
- Election of the Council of the People's Commissars (Sovnarkom)
- Adoption of decrees and legislative acts
- Legislative and administrative actions assigned to it

== See also ==
- All-Union Congress of Soviets
- All-Union Council on Physical Culture and Sports
