= Soviet of Nationalities =

Upper house of the USSR legislature

Soviet of Nationalities Совет Национальностей
- Legislative body in the Soviet Union

Type
- Type: Upper house of the Supreme Soviet of the Soviet Union

History
- Established: 1938
- Disbanded: 21 October 1991
- Preceded by: Congress of Soviets
- Succeeded by: Soviet of the Republics (in USSR); Soviet of Nationalities (in Russia); CIS Interparliamentary Assembly

Leadership
- Chairman: Rafik Nishanov (last)

Structure
- Seats: 750
- Political groups: Communist Party of the Soviet Union (521); Independents (229)

Elections
- Voting system: Direct election
- Last election: 4 March 1984

Meeting place
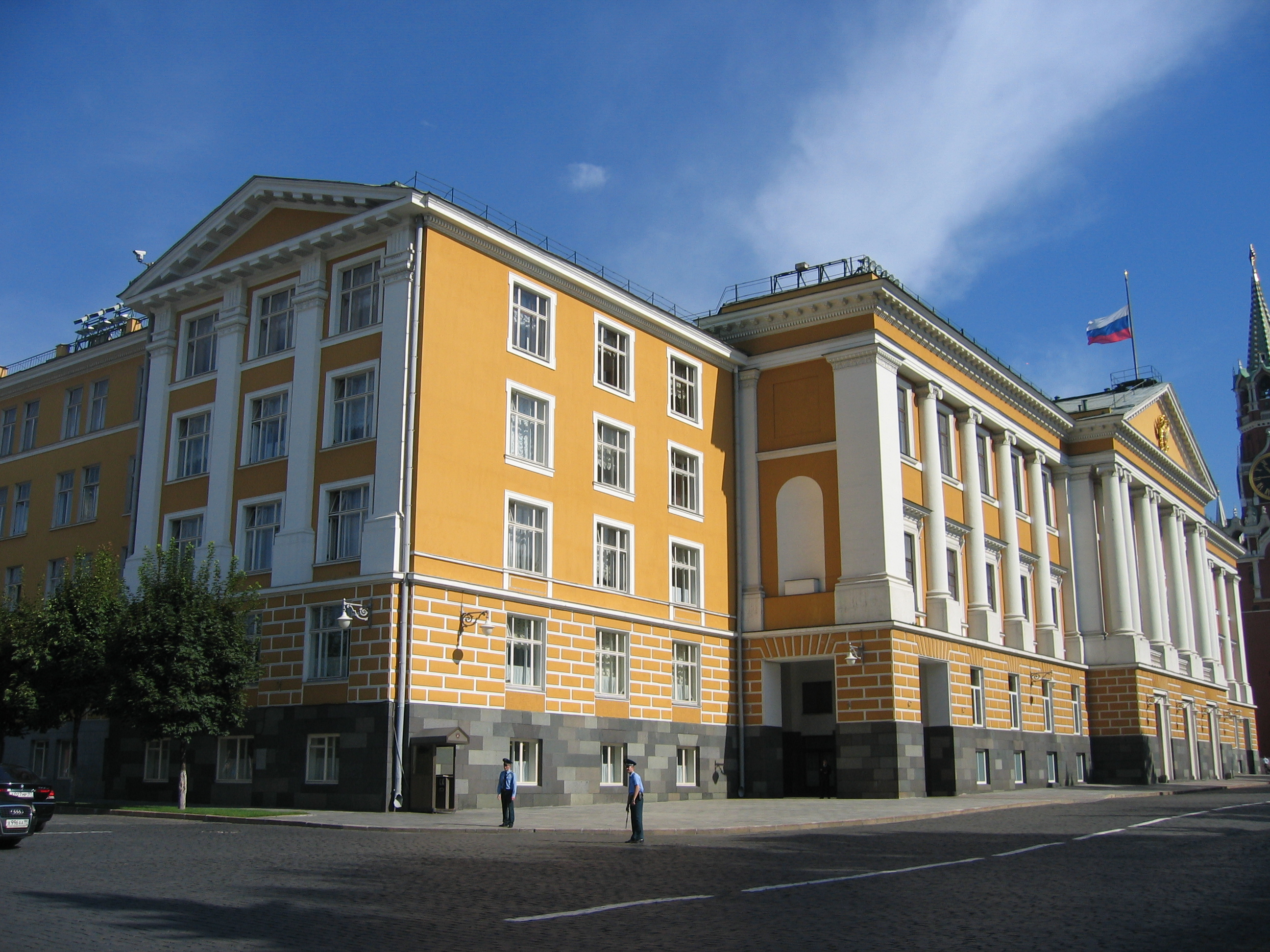
- Kremlin Presidium, Moscow Kremlin

The Soviet of Nationalities (Note: Russian: Совет Национальностей, romanized: Sovet Nacionaljnostej; Armenian: Ազգությունների Խորհուրդ, romanized: Azguthyunneri Khorhurd; Azerbaijani: Милләтләр Совети, romanized: Millətlər Soveti; Belarusian: Савет Нацыянальнасьцей, romanized: Saviet Nacyjanalnaściej; Estonian: Rahvuste Nõukogu; Georgian: ეროვნების საბჭო, romanized: erovnebis sabch'o; Kazakh: Ұлттар Кеңесі, romanized: Ūlttar Keñesı; Kyrgyz: Улуттар Кеңеши, romanized: Uluttar Kengeshi; Latvian: Tautību Padome; Lithuanian: Tautybių Taryba; Moldovan: Советул Националитэцилор, romanized: Sovietul Naționalităților; Tajik: Шӯрои Миллатҳо, romanized: Sho‘royi Millatho; Turkmen: Миллетлер Геңеши, romanized: Milletler Geňeşi; Ukrainian: Рада Національностей, romanized: Rada Nacionaľnostej; Uzbek: Миллатлар Кенгаши, romanized: Millatlar Kengashi) was the upper chamber of the Supreme Soviet of the Union of Soviet Socialist Republics, elected on the basis of universal, equal and direct suffrage in accordance with the principles of Soviet democracy. Until democratization in the late-1980s, however, only a single candidate nominated by the Communist Party of the Soviet Union was permitted to stand for election in each constituency. It was briefly succeeded by the Soviet of the Republics from October to December 1991. As opposed to the Soviet of the Union, the Soviet of Nationalities was composed of the nationalities of the Soviet Union, which in turn followed administrative division rather than being a representation of ethnic groups.

== Background ==
Prior to the creation of the Supreme Soviet in 1938 by the Soviet Constitution of 1936, the Soviet of Nationalities was one of the bodies that formed the Central Executive Committee of the Soviet Union, the other being the Soviet of the Union. Created by the 1924 Constitution to represent the national-territorial units of the Soviet Union in 1924, the Soviet of Nationalities included 5 delegates from union-level republics and ASSRs and 1 delegate from each autonomous oblast.

== History ==
The Soviet of the Nationalities was formed on the basis of equal representation of all the Republics of the Soviet Union (32 deputies from each republic, excluding other autonomous units inside that republic which sent in separate members), autonomous republics (11 deputies from each republic), autonomous oblasts (five deputies from each oblast), and national districts (one deputy from each district). As a result, the largest republic, the Russian SFSR with a population of 147 million, and the smallest republic, the Estonian SSR with a population of about 1.5 million, got 32 deputies each. Russians as an ethnic group made up more than half of the population of the Soviet Union, but the Soviet of Nationalities did not represent ethnic groups, it represented the different nationalities as expressed by the republics and various autonomous units of the Soviet Union. This electoral system seriously diminished representation of larger ethnic groups in favor of the smaller ethnic groups of the Soviet Union, with the Russians being most underrepresented.

The Soviet of Nationalities enjoyed the same rights as the Soviet of the Union in the area of legislative initiative and in resolving other issues inside the competence of the Soviet Union. In practice, until 1989, it did little more than approve decisions already made by the top leadership of the Communist Party of the Soviet Union. After the 1989 elections–the first, and as it turned out, only, free elections ever held in the Soviet Union–the Soviet of Nationalities acquired a much greater role, and was the scene of many lively debates.

The Soviet of Nationalities elected a chairman (who would lead the sessions of the chamber), his four deputies, and permanent commissions: Mandate Commission, Commission on Legislative Suppositions, Budget Planning Commission, Foreign Affairs Commission, Youth Affairs Commission, Industry Commission, Transportation and Communications Commission, Construction and Industry of Building Materials Commission, Agricultural Commission, Consumer Goods Commission, Public Education Commission, Science and Culture Commission, Trade Commission, Consumer Service and Municipal Economy Commission, Environmental Commission.

The presidium of the Soviet of Nationalities "ceased all noticeable work at the end of 1937", but it did "survive as the sole central political institution formally devoted to the nationalities question".

In 1989, it was reduced to 271 deputies elected by the Congress of People's Deputies. Its deputies were elected representing national-territorial electoral districts and public organizations.

== Soviet of the Republics ==
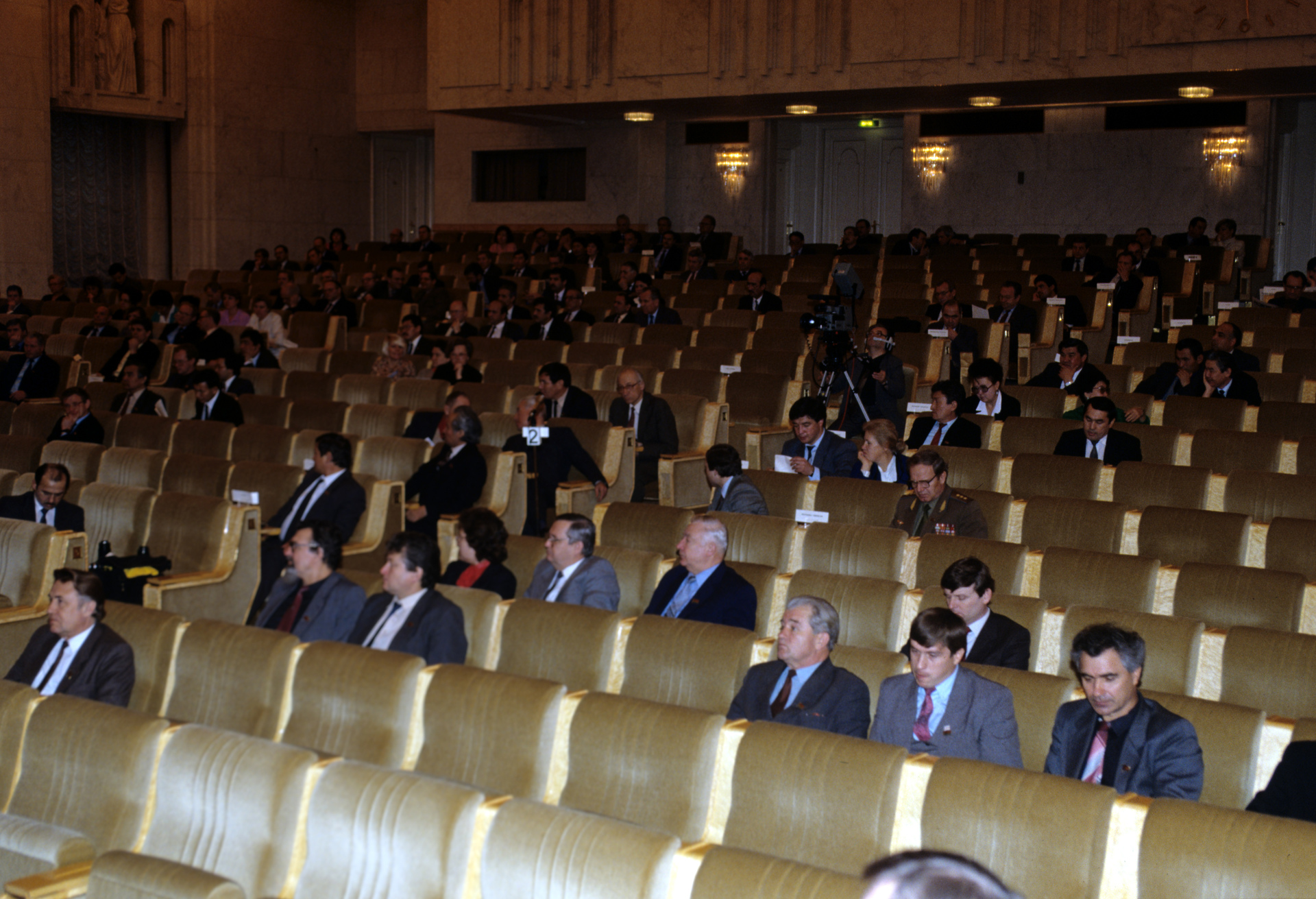
Final session of the Soviet of Nationalities, December 1991

The Soviet of the Republics — the upper chamber of the Supreme Soviet of the USSR, created on the basis of the USSR Law of 5 September 1991 "On the bodies of state power and administration of the USSR in the transition period", however, not provided for by the Constitution of the USSR. The first meeting of the new chamber took place on 21 October. Anuarbek Alimzhanov, a deputy from Kazakhstan, was elected chairman of the chamber.

The Council of Republics consisted of 20 deputies from each union republic from among the people's deputies of the USSR and union republics, delegated by the highest bodies of state power of these republics. Taking into account the federal structure of the RSFSR, it had 52 deputies in the Council of Republics.

Other union republics, which include republics and autonomous formations, additionally delegated to the Council of Republics one deputy from each republic and autonomy. In order to ensure the equality of the republics when voting in the Council of Republics, each union republic had one vote.

The Council of Republics made decisions on the organization and procedure for the activities of union bodies, ratifies and denounces international treaties.

On 26 December 1991 the Soviet of the Republics adopted a resolution declaring that the Soviet Union no longer existed as a functioning state and voted both itself and the Soviet Union out of existence. The Soviet of the Union had effectively been dissolved two weeks earlier when Russia unilaterally recalled its deputies, leaving it without a quorum. This declaration by the Soviet of the Republics was thus the final legal step in the dissolution of the Soviet Union.

== See also ==
- Chairman of the Soviet of Nationalities
- Korenizatsiya
- Soviet of Nationalities of the Russian SFSR
- Chamber of Nations of the Czechoslovak Federal Assembly
- 1977 Soviet Constitution
- 1936 Soviet Constitution
