= Congress of Soviets of the Soviet Union =

Supreme governing body of the USSR (1922–1936)

All-Union Congress of Soviets Всесоюзный съезд Советов
- Soviet Union

Type
- Type: Unicameral

History
- Established: 30 December 1922
- Disbanded: 5 December 1936
- Preceded by: Republic-level Congresses of Soviets: (Russian Soviet Federative Socialist Republic) All-Russian Congress of Soviets; (Ukrainian Soviet Socialist Republic) All-Ukrainian Congress of Soviets; (Byelorussian Soviet Socialist Republic) All-Byelorussian Congress of Soviets; (Transcaucasian Socialist Federative Soviet Republic) All-Caucasian Congress of Soviets
- Succeeded by: Supreme Soviet of the Soviet Union

Leadership
- Chairman of the Presidium of the Congress: Mikhail Kalinin

Structure
- Seats: 2025
- Political groups: All-Union Communist Party (Bolsheviks) (1448); Komsomol (161); Independents (416)

Elections
- Voting system: Indirect election
- First election: 1922
- Last election: 1936

The All-Union Congress of Soviets (Russian: Всесоюзный съезд Советов, IPA: [fsʲɪsɐˈjuznɨj sjest sɐˈvʲetəf]) was formally the supreme governing body of the Soviet Union from its formation (30 December 1922) until the adoption of its second constitution in 1936. The Congress of Soviets determined the general direction of all public bodies and elected the Central Executive Committee of the Soviet Union: a body which was accountable to, and held the powers of the Congress when the Congress was not in session. With the 1936 Constitution, the All-Union Congress was replaced by the Supreme Soviet.

== History ==
Prior to the creation of the All-Union Congress of Soviets in 1922, the individual republics had grown closer towards each other and various republics had signed multiple treaties and well on their way to combining their strength. By the early 1920s, the Russian Soviet Federative Socialist Republic and the Ukrainian, Byelorussian, and Azerbaijan Soviet Socialist Republics had taken steps to combine their economic and military strength, which led to a closer political relationship. When the All-Union Congress was formed, the republics that comprised the new Union were the Russian Socialist Federated Soviet Republic (R.S.F.S.R), the Ukrainian and Byelorussian Soviet Socialist Republics, and the Transcaucasian Socialist Federated Soviet Republic, which was formed by Azerbaijan, Georgia, and Armenia. During its tenure, more Soviet republics joined the Congress of Soviets. The Uzbek and Turkmen Soviet Socialist Republics were admitted in 1924, followed by the Tadzhik Autonomous Soviet Socialist Republic, which became a Union Republic in 1929.

== Election ==
The Congress of Soviets of the Soviet Union was composed of representatives from the councils of all the Soviet republics on the following basis: from the City Council - 1 member per 25 thousand voters, from provincial (regional, territorial) and republic-level congresses - 1 member per 125 thousand residents. Delegates to the All-Union Congress were elected at the provincial (regional, territorial) autonomous republican congresses of the Soviets, or (if republic did not have provincial (and then provincial, regional) congresses) - directly at the Congress of Soviets of the union republic.

== Powers ==
The exclusive jurisdiction of the Congress of Soviets consists of:

- Rights to conclude treaties, conduct diplomatic relations, and declare war
- Establish a union citizenship
- Settle disputes between republics
- Coin money, establish postal services, and establish standard weights and measures
- Power to develop a general plan for the entire national economy
- Establish general principles for the development and use of soil, mineral deposits, forests, and bodies of water
- Power to direct transport, telegraph services, and foreign trade
- Responsibility of the establishment of new Republics to the Congress
- Amending of the Constitution of the USSR

The only chairman of the Presidium of the Congress was Mikhail Kalinin.

== Congresses ==
=== First All-Union Congress of Soviets ===
The first congress was held on 30 December 1922 in Moscow with delegates from Russian Soviet Federative Socialist Republic, the Ukrainian Soviet Socialist Republic, the Transcaucasian Socialist Federative Soviet Republic and the Belarusian Soviet Socialist Republic. The Congress approved the Treaty on the Creation of the USSR, the basis of the 1924 Soviet Constitution, and thus formally created the Soviet Union with the four as founding Union Republics.

=== Second Congress of the Soviets of the USSR ===
The Second Congress of the Soviets of the USSR was held in January 1924 to ratify the 1924 Constitution of the Soviet Union. The Constitution was submitted to the All-Union Congress of Soviets on 6 July 1923 for ratification upon the body's next meeting. This meeting included a speech from Stalin. Stalin departed from Marxism and drew on his own theological training. He said "Leaving us, comrade Lenin bequeathed to us the duty of holding high and keeping pure the great calling member of the party. We swear to thee, comrade Lenin, that we shall fulfil this thy commandment with honour." Many oaths and honours were proclaimed to Lenin, who had just died a few days before the Second Congress began its session.

=== Third Congress of Soviets of the USSR ===
The Third Congress of Soviets was held in 1925.

=== Fourth Congress of Soviets of the USSR ===
The Fourth Congress of Soviets was held in 1927.

=== Seventh Congress of Soviets of the USSR ===
The Seventh Congress of Soviets of the USSR was held in February 1935, when Stalin introduced the proposal for constitutional reform. The proposal was initially discussed in the meeting of the Central Committee of the Communist Party held before the Seventh Congress. The Congress voted "that the new constitution should incorporate some of the best features of parliamentary democracy, that the representation of urban and rural voters should be equalized, that voting should be secret and direct, and that the All-Union Central Executive Committee should appoint a constitutional commission to draft the new organic law."

=== Eighth Congress of Soviets of the USSR ===
The Extraordinary Eighth Congress of Soviets of the USSR was held from November 1936 to December 1936 to ratify the 1936 Constitution of the Soviet Union, thereby dissolving itself permanently and transferring its powers to the newly established Supreme Soviet of the Soviet Union. The All-Union Congress approved the Constitution, and also approved plans for the publication of copies of the Constitution and invited citizens to discuss the new changes to the Constitution.
