= Mikhail Kalinin =

Soviet politician (1875–1946)

- Михаил Калинин
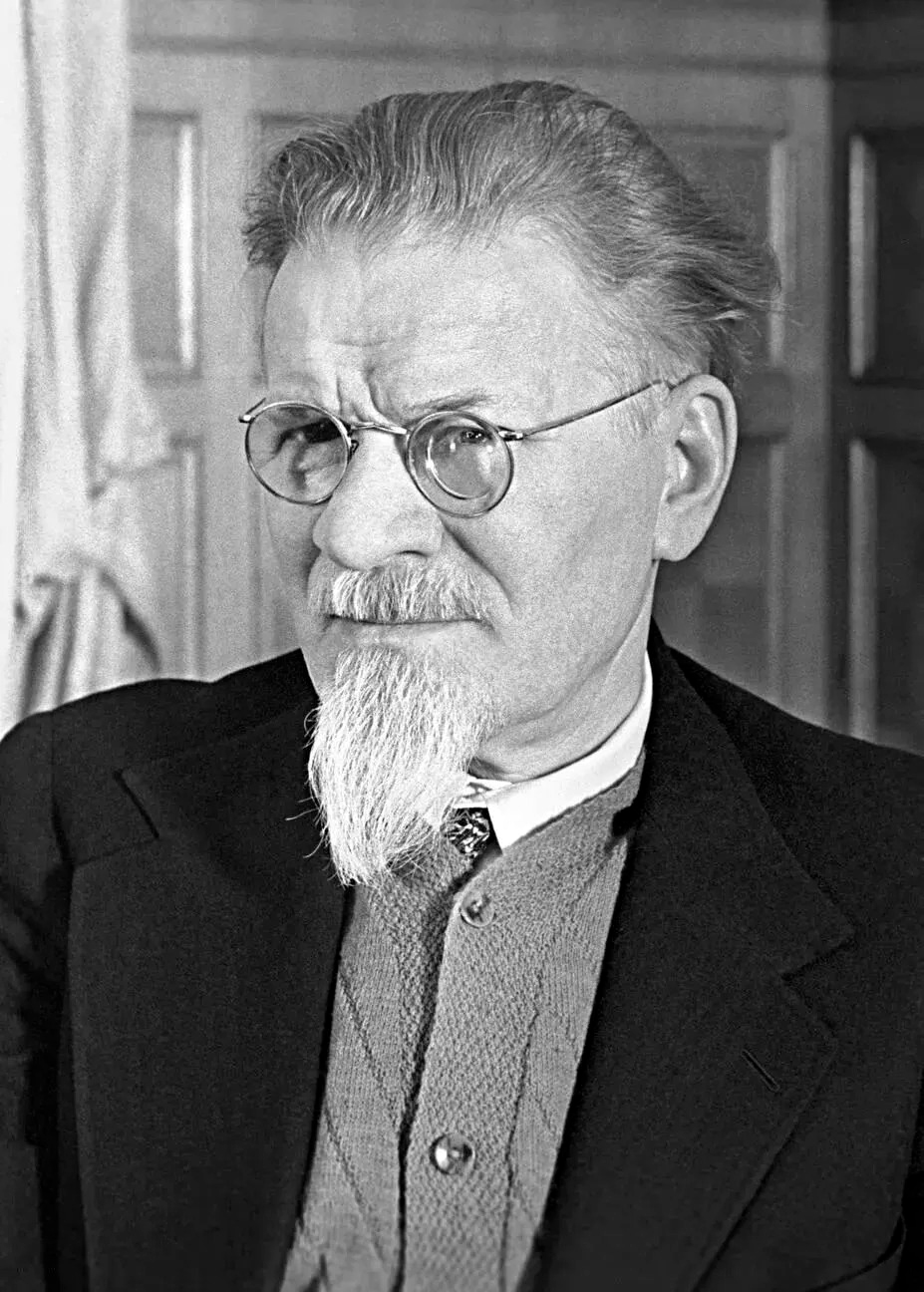
- Kalinin in 1940

Chairman of the Presidium of the Supreme Soviet of the Soviet Union
- In office 17 January 1938 – 20 March 1946
- Premier: Vyacheslav Molotov; Joseph Stalin
- Deputy: Nikolai Shvernik
- Preceded by: Office established
- Succeeded by: Nikolai Shvernik

Co-Chairman of the Presidium of the Central Executive Committee of the Soviet Union (Note: While the Presidium of the Central Executive Committee had a collective group of chairmen, the chairman from the Russian SFSR was often considered as the first among equals.)
- In office 30 December 1922 – 17 January 1938
- Preceded by: Office established
- Succeeded by: Office abolished; Himself (as Chairman of the Presidium of the Supreme Soviet)

Chairman of the Central Executive Committee of the All-Russian Congress of Soviets
- In office 30 March 1919 – 15 July 1938
- Premier: Vladimir Lenin; Alexei Rykov; Sergey Syrtsov; Daniil Sulimov; Nikolai Bulganin
- Preceded by: Mikhail Vladimirsky (acting)
- Succeeded by: Office abolished; Alexei Badayev (as Chairman of the Presidium of the Supreme Soviet of the Russian SFSR)
Other offices held
Full member of the 15th, 16th, 17th, and 18th Politburo
In office
1 January 1926 – 3 June 1946
Member of the Orgburo
In office
16 March 1921 – 2 June 1924
Candidate member of the 8th, 9th, 10th, 11th, 12th, 13th, and 14th Politburo
In office
25 March 1919 – 1 January 1926

Personal details
- Born: 19 November 1875 Verkhnyaya Troitsa, Russia
- Died: 3 June 1946 (aged 70) Moscow, Russian SFSR, Soviet Union
- Resting place: Kremlin Wall Necropolis
- Party: RSDLP (1898–1903); RSDLP (Bolsheviks) (1903–1918); VKP(b) (1918–1946)
- Spouse: Ekaterina Ivanovna Lorberg-Kalinina
- Occupation: Civil servant

Mikhail Ivanovich Kalinin (Russian: Михаил Иванович Калинин, IPA: [mʲɪxɐˈ(j)iɫ kɐˈlʲinʲɪn]; 19 November [O.S. 7 November] 1875 – 3 June 1946) was a Soviet politician and Russian Old Bolshevik revolutionary who served as the head of state of the Soviet Union from 1919 until his resignation in 1946. (Note: This position was largely ceremonial, with actual power residing with Communist Party leader Joseph Stalin) From 1926 until his death, he was a member of the Politburo of the All-Union Communist Party (Bolsheviks).

Born to a peasant family, Kalinin worked as a metal worker in Saint Petersburg and took part in the 1905 Russian Revolution as an early member of the Bolsheviks. During and after the October Revolution, he served as mayor of Petrograd (St. Petersburg). After the revolution, Kalinin became the head of the new Soviet state, as well as a member of the Central Committee of the Communist Party and the Politburo. He also was the Chairman of the Central Executive Committee of the Soviet Union.

Kalinin remained the titular head of state of the Soviet Union after the rise of Joseph Stalin, with whom he enjoyed a privileged relationship, but held little real power or influence. He retired in 1946 and died in the same year. The former East Prussian city of Königsberg, annexed by the Soviet Union in 1945, was renamed Kaliningrad after him a year later. The city of Tver was also known as Kalinin until 1990, when its historic name was restored, one year before the eventual fall of the Soviet Union. At 19 years, Kalinin's tenure was the longest of any non-monarchical Russian head of state until it was surpassed by Vladimir Putin in 2020.

== Early life ==
Mikhail Ivanovich Kalinin was born on 19 November 1875 to a peasant family of ethnic Russian origin in the village of Verkhnyaya Troitsa (Верхняя Троица), Tver Governorate, Russia.

Kalinin worked with his father on the land until the age of 13. When he was 10, he was taught to read and write by an army veteran. At 11, he entered a primary school run by a local landowning family. When he finished school, the family took him to Saint Petersburg to work as a footman. At 16, he was sent as an apprentice in a cartridge factory, and at 18, he was employed as a lathe operator in the Putilov factory.

== Early political career ==
Kalinin joined the Russian Social Democratic Labour Party in 1898, while still working at the Putilov works. The following year, he was arrested, imprisoned for 10 months, then exiled to the Caucasus, and found work as a craftsman at the Tbilisi railway depot, where he met Sergei Alliluyev, the father of Joseph Stalin's second wife. He came to know Stalin through the Alliluyev family. Dismissed for taking part in a strike, and later deprived of the right to work in the Caucasus, he moved to Reval, in Estonia, where he was arrested again in 1903, he spent six months in custody in St Petersburg, then two and a half months in Kresty Prison. After his release, he returned to Reval, but was arrested again in 1904 and exiled in Siberia.

Released in 1905, Kalinin returned to St Petersburg, and moved from job to job. In 1906, he married the ethnic Estonian Ekaterina Lorberg (Russian: Екатерина Ивановна Лорберг (Yekaterina Ivanovna Lorberg, 1882–1960). She changed her last name to Kalinina after the marriage. In the same year, he joined the Bolshevik faction of the RSDLP, headed by Vladimir Lenin, and was on the staff of the Central Union of Metal Workers.

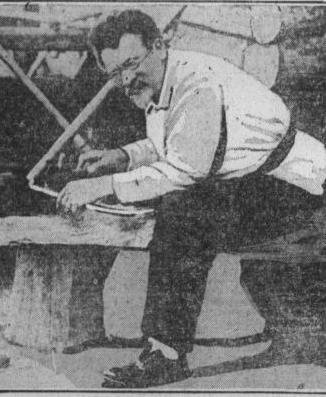
Kalinin pictured in his hometown in 1922

He served as a delegate at the 4th Congress of the Russian Social Democratic Labour Party, in April 1906, and to the 1912 Bolshevik Party Conference held in Prague, where he was elected an alternate member of the governing Central Committee and sent to work inside Russia. He did not become a full member because he was suspected of being an Okhrana agent (the real agent was Roman Malinovsky, a full member). In November 1916, during World War I, while he was again working in a factory in St Petersburg, Kalinin was arrested again and was due to be deported to Siberia, but was freed during the February Revolution of 1917.

== Russian Revolutions ==
Kalinin joined the Petrograd Bolshevik committee and assisted in the organization of the party daily newspaper Pravda, now legalized by the new regime.

In April 1917, Kalinin, like many other Bolsheviks, advocated conditional support for the Provisional Government in cooperation with the Menshevik faction of the RSDLP, a position at odds with that of Lenin. He continued to oppose an armed uprising to overthrow the government of Alexander Kerensky throughout that summer.

In the elections held for the Petrograd City Duma in autumn 1917, Kalinin was chosen as mayor of the city, which he administered during and after the Bolshevik Revolution of 7 November.

In 1919, Kalinin was elected a member of the governing Central Committee of the Russian Communist Party as well as a candidate member of the Politburo. He was promoted to full membership on the Politburo in January 1926, a position which he retained until his death in 1946.

When Yakov Sverdlov died in March 1919 from influenza, Kalinin replaced him as President of the All-Russian Central Executive Committee, the titular head of state of Soviet Russia. The name of this position was changed to Chairman of the Central Executive Committee of the USSR in 1922 and to Chairman of the Presidium of the Supreme Soviet in 1938. Kalinin continued to hold the post without interruption until his retirement at the end of World War II.

In 1920, Kalinin attended the Second World Congress of the Communist International in Moscow as part of the Russian delegation. He was seated on the presidium rostrum and took an active part in the debates.

== Soviet Union ==
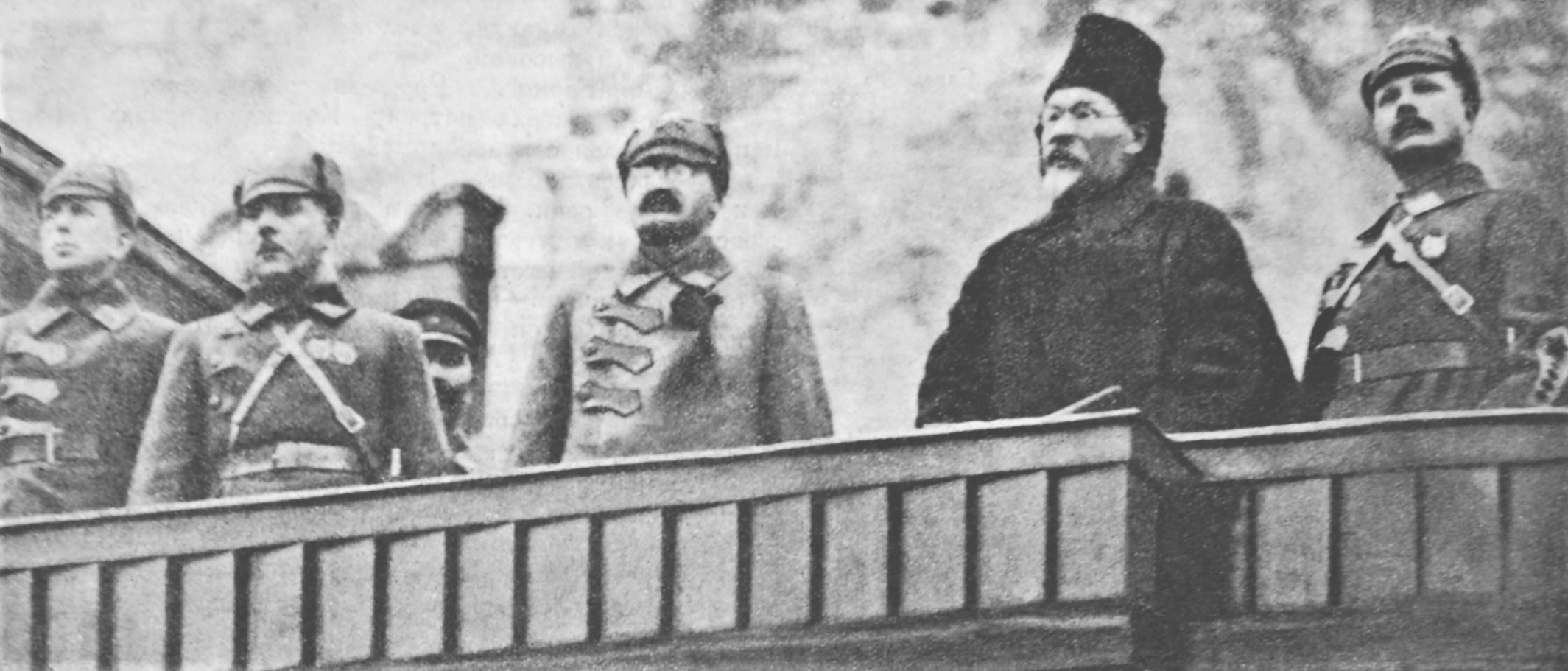
Bubnov, Voroshilov, Trotsky, Kalinin and Frunze, October Revolution military parade, 1924

Kalinin was a factional ally of Stalin during the bitter struggle for power after the death of Lenin in 1924. He delivered a report on Lenin and the Comintern to the Fifth World Congress in 1924.

Kalinin was one of the comparatively few members of Stalin's inner circle springing from peasant origins. The lowly social origins were widely publicised in the official press, which habitually referred to Kalinin as the "All-Union Elder" (Всесоюзный староста), a term harking back to the village community, in conjunction with his role as titular head of state. In practical terms, by the 1930s, Kalinin's role as a decision-maker in the Soviet government was nominal.

Although he was a member of the Politburo, the de facto executive branch of the Soviet Union, and nominally held the second-highest state post in the USSR, Kalinin held little power or influence. His role was mostly limited to receiving diplomatic letters from abroad. Recalling him, future Soviet leader Nikita Khrushchev said, "I don't know what practical work Kalinin carried out under Lenin. But under Stalin he was the nominal signatory of all decrees, while in reality he rarely took part in government business."

On 5 March 1940, six members of the Politburo – Kalinin, Stalin, Vyacheslav Molotov, Lazar Kaganovich, Kliment Voroshilov, and Anastas Mikoyan – signed an order to execute 25,700 Polish "nationalists and counterrevolutionaries" (Polish intelligentsia, priests, and military officers) kept at camps and prisons in occupied western Ukraine and Belarus, ultimately leading to the Katyn massacre.

== Personality ==
Despite holding high-ranking state offices, Kalinin held limited political power and functioned largely as a ceremonial figurehead under Stalin's leadership. According to Russian historian Roy Medvedev, Stalin kept Kalinin under virtual house arrest with NKVD agents stationed in his apartment, asserting that Kalinin complied with Stalin's policies and lent his public prestige to the Soviet government. Trotsky wrote:

For a long time, he was afraid to tie his own fate to Stalin's. 'That horse', he was wont to say to his intimates, 'will some day drag our wagon into a ditch.' But gradually, groaning and resisting, he turned first against me, then against Zinoviev, and finally, with even greater reluctance, against Rykov, Bukharin and Tomsky, with whom he was more closely connected because of his moderate views.

Kalinin was unable to protect his wife, Ekaterina Kalinina, who was critical of Stalin's policies and was arrested on 25 October 1938 on charges of being a "Trotskyist". At the time of her arrest Ekaterina and her husband were not living together. Although her husband was the chair of the Presidium of the Supreme Soviet (1938–46), she was tortured in Lefortovo Prison and on 22 April 1939, she was sentenced to fifteen years' imprisonment in a labour camp. She was released shortly before her husband's death in 1946.

Shortly before Kalinin died, the Montenegrin communist, Milovan Djilas, was one of a delegation of Yugoslav communists, led by Josip Broz Tito, who dined in the Kremlin with Stalin and other Soviet leaders. Djilas recalled:

Old Uncle Kalinin, who could barely see, had difficulty finding his glass, plate, bread, and I kept helping him solicitously ... Stalin certainly knew of Kalinin's decrepitude, for he made heavy-handed fun of him when the old man asked Tito for a Yugoslav cigarette. 'Don't take any – those are capitalist cigarettes,' said Stalin, and Kalinin confusedly dropped the cigarette from his trembling fingers, whereupon Stalin laughed and the expression on his face was like a satyr's.

== Death and legacy ==
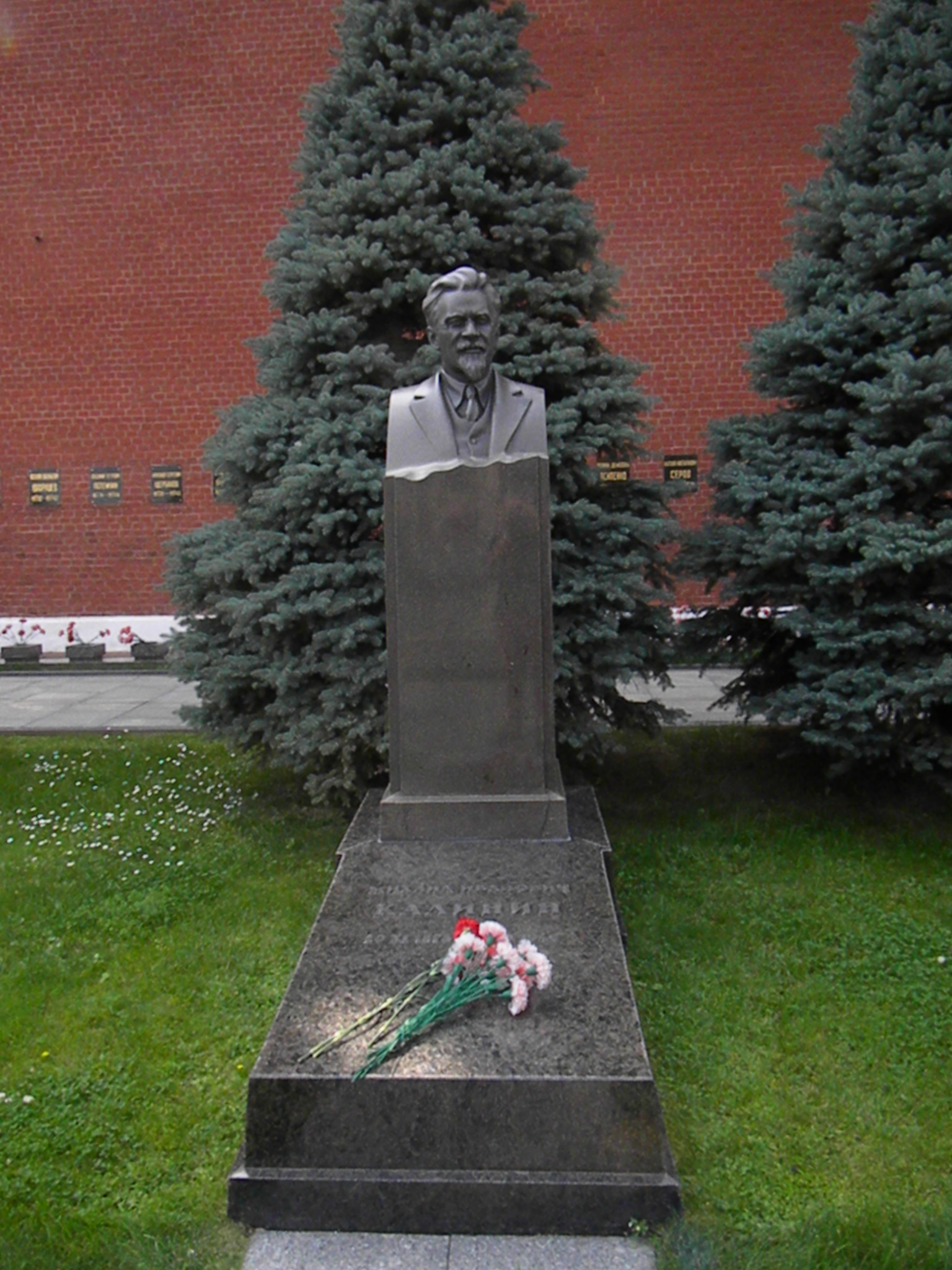
Kalinin's tomb in the Kremlin Wall Necropolis

Kalinin retired in 1946 and died of cancer on 3 June that year in Moscow. He was honoured with a state funeral and was buried in the Kremlin Wall Necropolis, in one of the twelve individual tombs located between the Lenin Mausoleum and the Kremlin Wall.

Three large cities (Tver, Korolyov and Königsberg) were renamed after Kalinin. Tver's historic name was restored in 1990. Korolyov, which had been known as Podlipki before 1938, was renamed in honour of the famous Soviet/Russian rocket scientist Sergey Korolev in 1996.

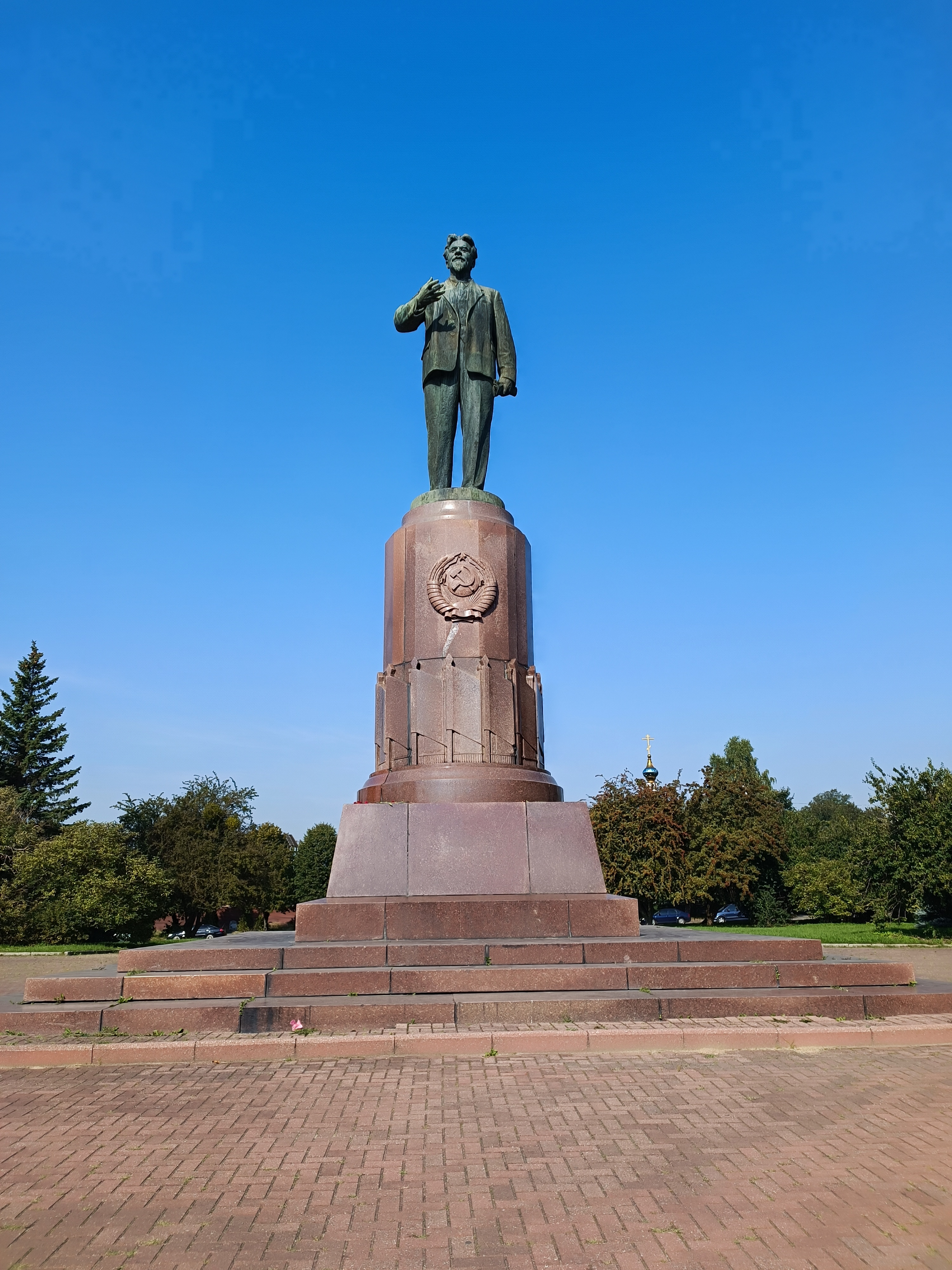
Monument to Mikhail Kalinin at the Kalinin Square in Kaliningrad

Kalinin Square and Kalinin Street, which were named after Kalinin, are located in Minsk, Belarus. Kalinin Street in Tallinn, Estonia was renamed Kopli Street following Estonian independence. Prospekt Kalinina in Dnipro, Ukraine was renamed Prospekt Serhiy Nigoyan in January 2015 as part of decommunization in Ukraine.

== See also ==
- Outline of the Russian Revolution and Civil War
- Bibliography of the Russian Revolution and Civil War
- Bibliography of Stalinism and the Soviet Union
- Index of Old Bolsheviks
- Index of articles related to the Russian Revolution and Civil War
- Stalin: Waiting for Hitler, 1929–1941, contains significant information about Kalinin

== Notes ==
Political offices
Preceded by Mikhail Vladimirsky acting	Chairman of the Central Executive Committee of the All-Russian Congress of Soviets; 1919–1938	Succeeded by Alexei Badayev as Chairman of the Supreme Soviet Presidium
Preceded by None	Chairman of the Central Executive Committee of the USSR; Along with others 1922–1938	Succeeded by Himself as Chair of the Supreme Soviet Presidium
Preceded by None	Chairman of the Presidium of the Supreme Soviet of the USSR; 1938–1946	Succeeded by Nikolai Shvernik
