= 1924 Constitution of the Soviet Union =

Governing document in the USSR

Constitution of the Soviet Union

Congress of Soviets of the Soviet Union
- Long title: 1924 Constitution of the Union of Soviet Socialist Republics
- Territorial extent: Soviet Union
- Enacted by: Congress of Soviets of the Soviet Union
- Signed by: Vladimir Lenin
- Effective: 31 January 1924; 102 years ago
- Repealed: 5 December 1936; 89 years ago

Repealed by
- 1936 Constitution of the Soviet Union
- Status: Repealed

The 1924 Constitution of the Soviet Union was the communist state constitution adopted on 31 January 1924.

== History of the Constitution ==
The 1924 Constitution was the first constitution of the Soviet Union and ratified by the Second Congress of Soviets. The 1924 Constitution legitimized the December 1922 Treaty on the Creation of the USSR between the Russian Soviet Federative Socialist Republic, the Ukrainian Soviet Socialist Republic, the Byelorussian Soviet Republic, and the Transcaucasian Socialist Federative Soviet Republic founding the Soviet Union. In essence, the 1924 Constitution was an expansion and generalization of the 1922 Treaty, with most of the major parts already specified by the treaty, and also allowed for a potential expansion of the Soviet Union.Whereas the original Treaty had only 26 articles, the 1924 Constitution now had 72 divided into eleven chapters. The 1924 Constitution replaced the Russian Constitution of 1918 which served as a precursor and influenced the main principles of the Union-wide constitution.

The 1924 Constitution established the Congress of Soviets to be the supreme body of Soviet state authority, with the Central Executive Committee having this authority during the interims and serving as the country's collective presidency. The Central Executive Committee also elected the Council of People's Commissars, which served as the executive branch of the government. The Central Executive Committee, effectively the legislature, was divided into the Soviet of the Union representing the constituent republics, and the Soviet of Nationalities representing directly the interests of nationality groups. The Presidium supervised the government administration between sessions of the Central Executive Committee.

The 1924 Constitution survived six editions until it was replaced by the 1936 Constitution of the Soviet Union on 5 December 1936.

== See also ==
- 1936 Soviet Constitution
- 1977 Soviet Constitution
- Bibliography of Stalinism and the Soviet Union § Government
