= V. L. Mukha =

Belarusian politician

V. L. Mukha was a Belarusian politician. During World War I he was a sailor in the Baltic Fleet and a Left Socialist-Revolutionary. In December 1917 he was named People's Commissar for Public Charity of Obliskomzap. Mukha was a delegate to the First All-Belorussian Congress, and he would resign from his post as People's Commissar over the violent disbanding of the event by Obliskomzap.

From March 1918 he joined the 16th Army of the Red Army, as a political engineer of radio communications. Between 1920 and 1954 he served in party and government roles in the Belorussian Soviet Socialist Republic, including serving as the deputy chairman of the Bobruisk Regional Executive Committee 1944–1946.
