= Belarusian-Polish administration of Minsk =

Transitional period in the history of Minsk during World War I

- Capital: Minsk
- Ethnic groups: Belarusians, Jews, Poles, Russians
- Religion: Eastern Orthodoxy, Judaism, Roman Catholicism
- Government: dual power, military administration
- History
  - Established: February 19, 1918
  - Disestablished: February 21, 1918
- Currency: ruble

Belarusian-Polish administration of Minsk was a brief transitional period in the history of Minsk during World War I, lasting from the disarmament of Bolshevik forces in the city on 19 February 1918, to the transfer of power to the German administration on 21 February of the same year. This period was characterized by dual power, during which most of the city was controlled by Polish volunteer military units, while a smaller part was controlled by Belarusian forces. During this time, for the first time, the white-red-white flag of an independent Belarus was displayed on the government administration building in Minsk.

== Historical context ==
In early 20th century, Minsk was a city within the Russian Empire. In 1914, World War I broke out, with Russia participating as an opponent of the Central Powers. Simultaneously, from 1917, the country experienced successive revolutions and an internal struggle for power and political order. Belarusian nationalism was a minor political force in the city, with the Belarusian nationalists having won 2 seats (out of 102) in the 1917 Minsk City Duma election and their list the having mustered only 160 votes (0.4%) in the 1917 Russian Constituent Assembly election. The Belarusian national movement in the city consisted only of a small circle of intellectuals.

As a result of the October Revolution, from November 1917, Minsk became the administrative center of the Obliskomzap (Regional Executive Committee of the Soviets of Workers, Soldiers and Peasants Deputies of the Western Region and Front) headed by the Armenian Alexander Miasnikian. There was also the Minsk Soviet of Workers and Soldiers Deputies, which competed with the Minsk City Duma over the governance of the city.

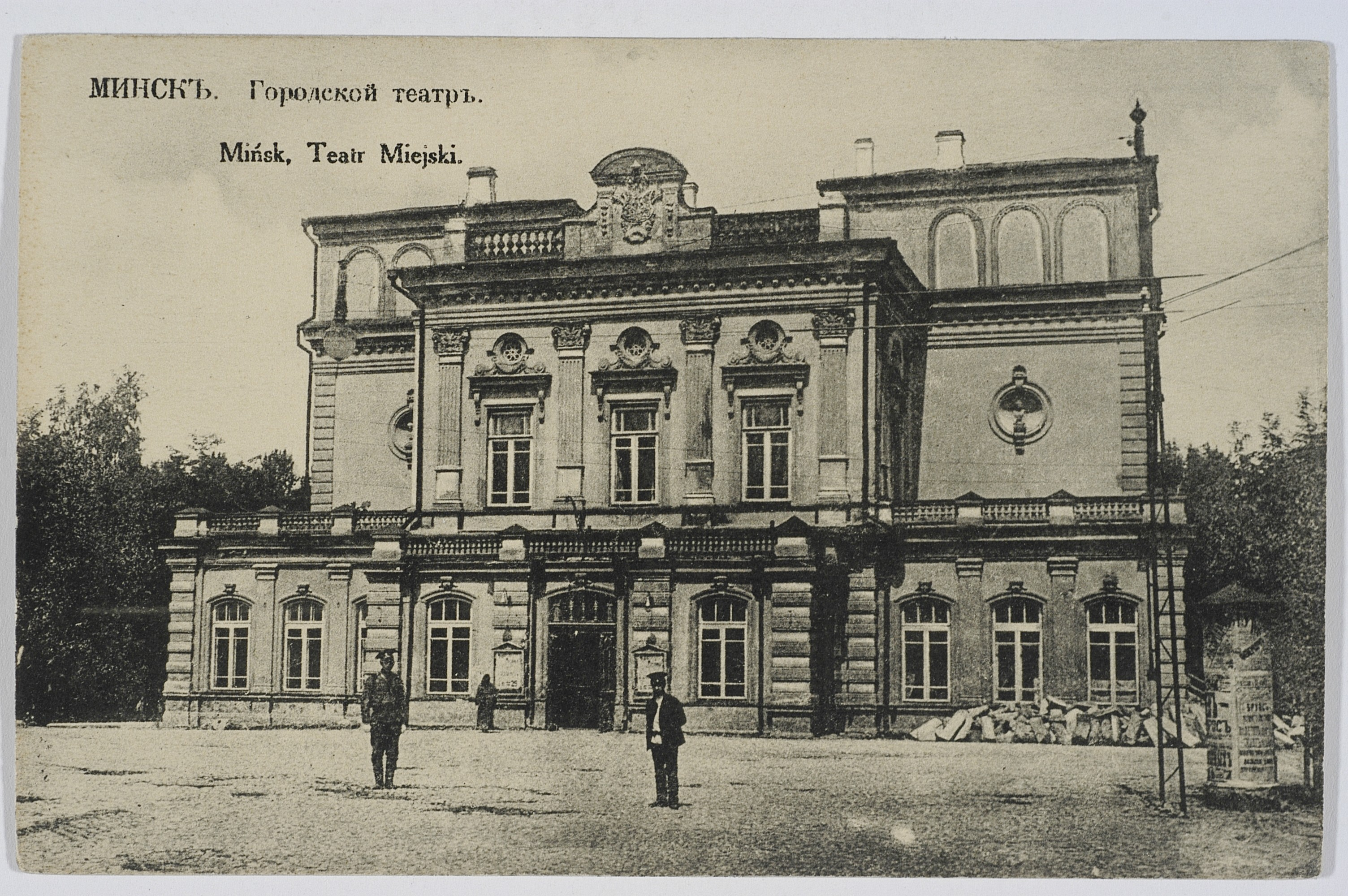
Building of the Minsk City Theater, where the meeting of the First All-Belarusian Congress took place

In December 1917, the First All-Belarusian Congress took place in Minsk, organized by the Belarusian Regional Committee (BOK, a grouping that had proposed the Congress as a move towards forming an autonomous or independent Belarusian government). Whilst the holding of the Congress had received the approval from Lenin, Stalin and Sverdlov, it was dispersed by the Obliskomzap after adopting a resolution which had recognized the latter solely as a provisional military entity. However, it managed to make decisions, including forming Belarusian military units with the help of the Central Belarusian Military Council under the leadership of Lt. Kastuś Jezavitaŭ. The leaders of the Congress also formed the Council of the All-Belarusian Congress, which declared itself the Congress' executive body and claimed the right to represent the Belarusian movement. Several Belarusian organizations, including the Central Belarusian Military Council, subordinated themselves to the Council. However, it still did not have real power and functioned in opposition to Obliskomzap, which controlled Minsk. At the turn of January and February 1918, the Central Belarusian Military Council was outlawed by the Bolsheviks, and its leadership was arrested.

Parallel to the Belarusian movement, organizations and structures related to the Polish movement were developing in Minsk. In May 1917, the Polish Council of the Minsk Land was established, bringing together numerous Polish organizations from the Minsk region. Its role was to act as a self-governing body for the Polish community. Initially, the council supported the national aspirations of the Belarusians, advocating for an autonomous Belarus within a democratic Russian Republic, while simultaneously seeking to guarantee the rights of the Polish minority. After the October Revolution, the council saw the Bolsheviks as the main threat and, not seeing a possibility for an independent Belarusian state, began advocating for the incorporation of the Minsk region into Poland. At the same time, Polish military formations and organizations operated in the Minsk region. In the summer of 1917, the 1st Polish Corps was established, which by the turn of 1917 and 1918 counted up to 50,000 soldiers in Belarus. In Minsk, from October 1917 to January 1918, a paramilitary Polish Civil Guard, formed by local residents, was active. After it was disarmed by the Bolsheviks, the Polish Council of the Minsk Land decided to continue training its members underground. The Polish Military Organization was also active in the city.

On 9 February 1918, the Central Powers signed a peace treaty in Brest with the Ukrainian People's Republic and issued an ultimatum to the Bolsheviks, demanding the immediate signing of peace on their terms. The Bolsheviks rejected the ultimatum, and as a result, on February 18, Germany and Austria-Hungary launched an offensive against them, rapidly advancing eastward. By the evening of the same day, they had reached Maladzyechna, located 65 km from Minsk. Due to the proximity of the front, it became clear that the Germans would reach the city within a few days.

== Course of events ==
=== Evacuation of the Bolsheviks ===
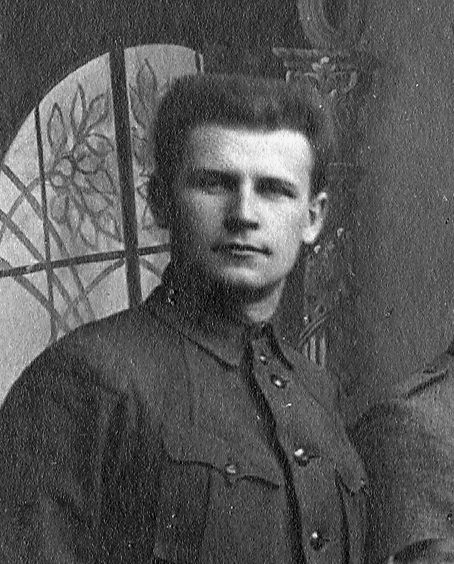
Belarusian commander of Minsk, Lieutenant Kastuś Jezavitaŭ

Upon hearing news of the start of the German offensive, the Bolsheviks in Minsk announced their intention to defend the city. The Executive Committee of the Council of People's Commissars of the Western Front, which held power in the city, declared that it would defend and ensure the integrity and safety of Soviet power. However, the Bolshevik troops were demoralized by demobilization and pacifist agitation, and their commanders were unable to stop their retreat. In this situation, at a meeting during the night of 18 to 19 February, the Council of People's Commissars decided not to resist and to evacuate to Smolensk. The Bolsheviks' retreat from Minsk took place in panic, chaos, and complete demoralization. Eyewitnesses described the retreating troops as being in a helpless, thoughtless rush:

"They left by cars and sleds... in a headlong rush, breaking vehicles, losing crates and bags, and unnerving both themselves and others".

The Bolshevik commissars in particular had trouble escaping, as the railway workers in Minsk decided around noon not to allow them to leave the city.

A serious sense of unrest also spread among the residents of Minsk. The exodus of the Bolsheviks reminded them of the retreat of the Tsarist army in 1915, which especially terrified the war refugees living in Minsk. On the other hand, there was also fear of other demoralized Bolshevik units, which, retreating eastward, burned and looted towns along their route (as happened, for example, in Koydanava). A rumor spread that hungry, wild, and disorganized groups of Bolshevik soldiers defeated by the 1st Polish Corps near Asipovichy were approaching the city. The Poles living in Minsk were particularly anxious, convinced that the Bolsheviks saw them as potential enemies. They feared retaliation for the Bolsheviks' defeats in the fight against the 1st Polish Corps. During the night of 18 to 19 February, Polish intelligence intercepted an order from Western Front commander Aleksandr Miasnikian, calling for a fight against the enemies of revolutionary power. On February 19, Lysakov, commander of the Minsk garrison, issued his last order, calling for a final reckoning with the Poles.

=== Preparations of Belarusians and Poles ===
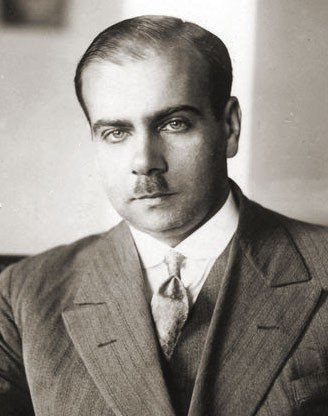
Polish commander of Minsk, Captain Ignacy Matuszewski, codenamed Topór

On February 19, around noon, the imprisoned six members of the Central Belarusian Military Council received news of the Germans approaching Minsk. Taking advantage of the general chaos, they managed to escape from the guardhouse where they were being held and met at the home of A. Lewicki around 2:00 PM. An hour later, an extraordinary session of the Executive Committee of the Central Belarusian Military Council began. The participants decided to attempt to take control of the city and transfer power to the Council of the All-Belarusian Congress. Kastuś Jezavitaŭ, leader of the Central Belarusian Military Council, was appointed the Belarusian commander of the city.

Independently of the Belarusians, the Poles were also preparing for action. At 4:00 PM, Polish military activists associated with the Polish Military Organization and the 1st Polish Corps met at the cobbler Dobraszczyc’s place. Initially, the group consisted of four people, including Captain Ignacy Matuszewski, but by 7:00 PM, it had grown to seven. At that point, they decided to carry out an offensive operation against the Bolsheviks. Captain Ignacy Matuszewski was appointed the Polish commander of the city, and he signed orders using the codename Topór.

For the Belarusian national activists, the "liberation of Minsk" held special significance, as the city was the main political center of their country and the planned seat of the government of their future republic. The Poles, on the other hand, saw Bolshevik rule as a threat. However, according to historian Dariusz Tarasiuk, these actions were primarily intended for propaganda purposes. The disorganization of the Bolsheviks and the fact that there was no real authority in the city at the time encouraged these efforts. Nonetheless, they were highly risky. The Bolsheviks held a significant numerical advantage over the Belarusian and Polish military units. The Bolsheviks had around 13,000 well-armed soldiers in Minsk, though most of them were at the railway stations, caught up in the retreat, while some were disoriented groups and deserters wandering through the city. The Poles likely had 343 soldiers armed with 27 rifles, although less reliable sources mentioned numbers of a few dozen and 1,600. The Belarusians, meanwhile, had hastily gathered groups of soldiers and union members, including railway workers and telegraphists. Another risk factor for the Poles was that their operation was not coordinated with the commander of the 1st Polish Corps, General Józef Dowbor-Muśnicki.

=== Military actions on February 19 ===
At 9:00 PM, the first independent Belarusian and Polish units appeared on the streets of Minsk. Their initial goal was to seize weapons by disarming the Bolsheviks present in the city. Despite their significant numerical superiority, the Bolsheviks offered little resistance to the soldiers disarming them. According to Melchior Wańkowicz, there was an incident where five Poles disarmed a Bolshevik unit of 150 soldiers. By 9:00 PM, the Poles had taken control of an armory on Skobielewska Street, which allowed them to arm 200 Polish volunteers. Soon, significant quantities of weapons were in the hands of the Belarusians and Poles. There were only minor skirmishes and shootings, and real resistance was offered by only about 100 Red Guards. Many new volunteers began joining the Belarusian and Polish formations.

The Poles began occupying key strategic points in the city with guard posts, organizing small but highly mobile patrols. Their mobility was intended to create the impression that numerous Polish troops had arrived in the city. At the same time, they spread rumors of Polish I Corps units entering Minsk to intimidate the enemy. Meanwhile, at 9:15 PM, the Belarusians took control of the arsenal on Moskiewska Street, at 9:20 PM – the Governor’s House, and at 9:25 PM, they stormed the main entrance of the Hotel Europa, where the headquarters of the Bolshevik Executive Committee of the Western District, the Cheka, and the Red Guards staff were located. Karl Lander and other high-ranking communist officials escaped through the back door of the building. The Belarusians made another attempt to capture them at the railway station with the help of railway workers, finally trying to blow up their train, causing two carriages to overturn and Karl Lander’s carriage to derail.

The blockade of the railway line resulted in growing numbers of Bolshevik military transports, retreating from the front and continuously arriving in Minsk, gathering at the stations. There was concern that desperate soldiers would leave the transports and enter the city or fire upon the stations using artillery and machine guns. As a result, after midnight, the railway workers unblocked the tracks, and the Bolshevik commissars managed to evacuate the city eastward.

At 10:00 PM, the Belarusians had gathered most of their forces around Freedom Square (formerly Cathedral Square) and sent car patrols through the city, informing residents that the Executive Committee of the Council of the All-Belarusian Congress had taken power in the city. An hour later, they began reporting "extremely provocative" disarmament of Belarusian units and individuals by the Poles. Around midnight, Polish soldiers seized the arsenal on Moskiewska Street from the Belarusians (according to one source, the operation was led by Witold and Melchior Wańkowicz). Despite the late hour, crowds of townspeople poured into the streets, observing the unfolding events.

=== Political actions on February 19 ===
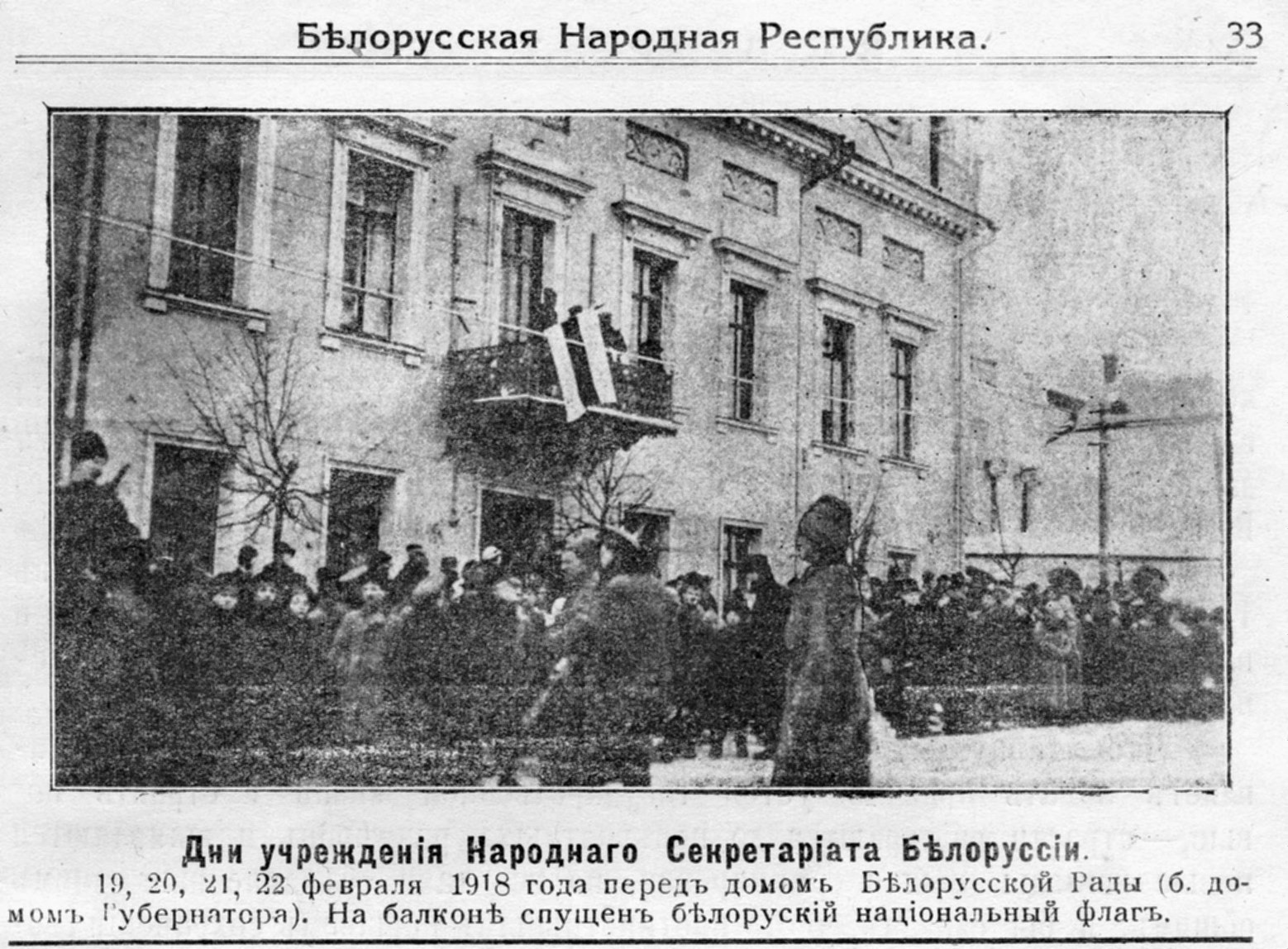
Belarusian flag on the governor’s house, 19–22 February 1918

Simultaneously with the military actions, the Belarusians and Poles began to establish their own administrations in Minsk. Both the Belarusian Commandant’s Office and the Polish Commandant’s Office were created independently of each other, and they even competed with one another, each trying to subordinate the other. The Polish Commandant’s Office declared that its goal was to maintain order and peace in the city, and it intended to ensure the safety not only of Poles but of all the residents of Minsk. It also issued an appeal to Russian soldiers, calling on them to peacefully leave the city. However, on the night of February 19/20, its work was chaotic and poorly organized. According to Stefan Żarnecki, who was present at the office, there was "incredible chaos (…) there was no one to talk to".

The Belarusians, on the other hand, made much more ambitious political decisions at that time. The Executive Committee of the Council of the All-Belarusian Congress, which had previously ordered the takeover of the city, intended to transform itself into a government representing the entirety of the Belarusian lands. To this end, it decided to include 27 representatives from Minsk, 9 from the provinces, 10 representatives each from city councils and zemstvos, as well as 15 representatives of national minorities: 7 Jews, 4 Poles, 2 Russians, and one Ukrainian and one Lithuanian. At 10:00 PM, the governor’s house was seized to serve as the headquarters of the Council of the All-Belarusian Congress, and the white-red-white flag of Belarus was hung from its balcony. This was the first time in history that this flag was flown on a state administration building in Minsk. The Executive Committee of the Council held its meetings there throughout the night of February 19/20.

=== Events of February 20 ===
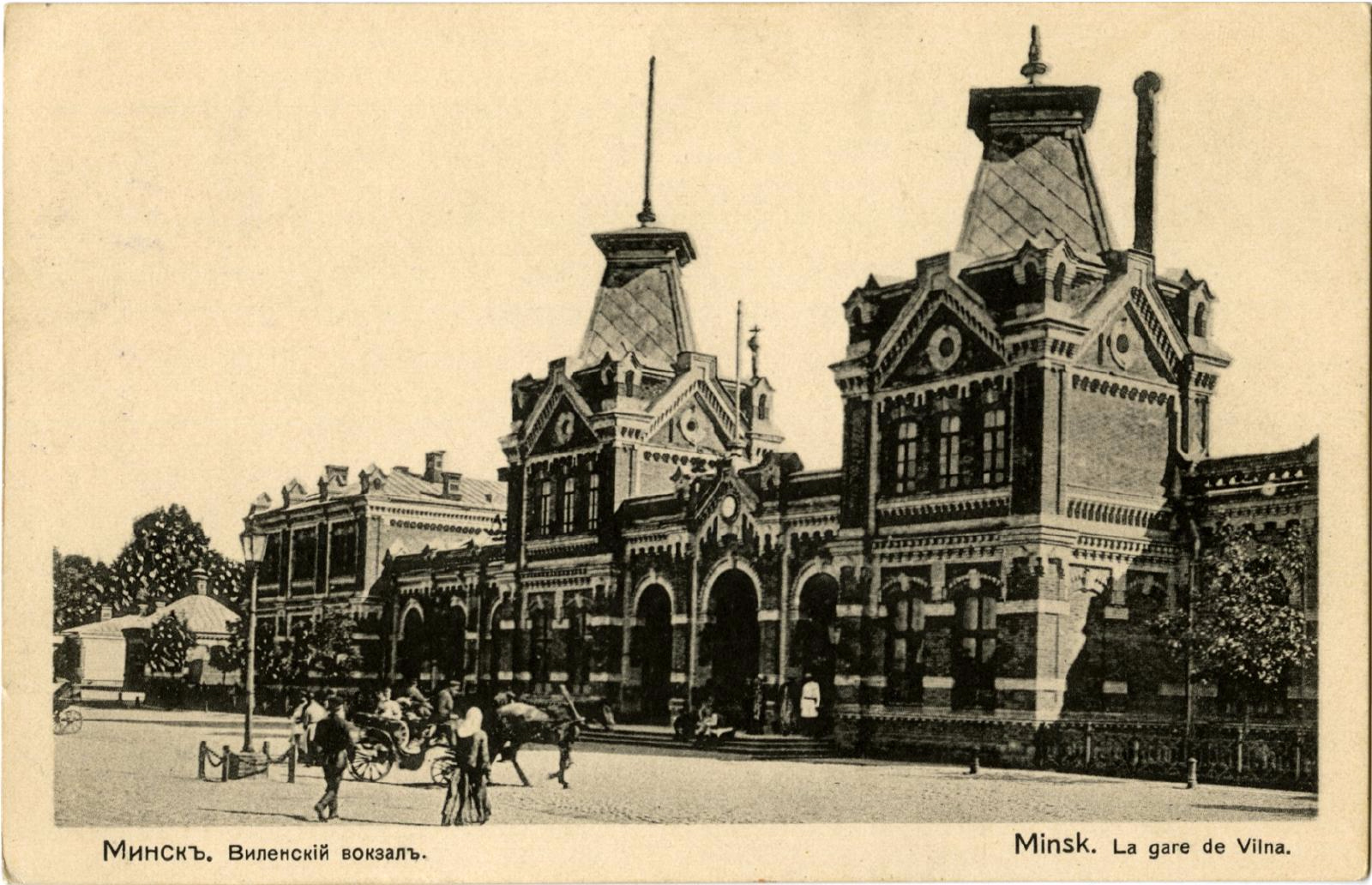
Libau–Romny railway station was located in the Polish sector of Minsk

As events unfolded, relations between the Belarusian and Polish formations grew increasingly tense, with the threat of armed conflict looming. However, both sides managed to avoid confrontation, and on February 20, a formal agreement was reached between the Belarusian Commandant’s Office and the Polish Commandant’s Office. A joint order from the unified commandant offices soon followed, announcing cooperation in maintaining order in the city. Minsk was divided into two zones: the Belarusians controlled the northwestern part, which included Freedom Square, the governor's house, and Hotel Europa, while the Poles controlled the southeastern part. Around noon, the Poles secured the area within the streets of Bobrujska, Kolomeński Lane, Upper Lachówka, Lower Lachówka, Policyjna, Targowa, Piotrpawłowska, and Zacharzewska up to Bobrujska. At 3:00 PM, they seized the Libau–Romny railway station, and around the power station, on the railway bridge, and at the barracks square, they engaged in several bloody skirmishes with the Bolsheviks.

The Belarusians established a Belarusian-Polish demarcation line along Kojdanowski Road, Moskiewska Street, Zacharzewska Street, and Homelski Road, while organizing their military units more systematically. The 1st Minsk Belarusian Regiment, led by I. Raczkiewicz, was formed, with Niemkiewicz and Miedwiediew commanding the cavalry, and Fłaryjan Żdanowicz taking command of the militia. However, both Belarusian and Polish patrols remained small and weakened by exhaustion from the prolonged action, coupled with freezing temperatures of −12 °C. Meanwhile, civilian life in Minsk continued with enthusiasm, with shops open and daily newspapers being published.

Despite the formal Belarusian-Polish agreement, various incidents increased tensions. The weaker military presence of the Belarusians encouraged the Poles to breach the agreement and push them out of their positions. Another source of conflict involved the Belarusians arming individuals previously disarmed by the Poles, who had deemed them Bolsheviks. According to historian Oleg Łatyszonek, there may have even been direct clashes between Belarusian and Polish soldiers. Both sides feared the arrival of other retreating Bolshevik units, while the Poles eagerly anticipated reinforcements from the 1st Polish Corps, hoping it would enter the city before the Germans.

On the night of February 19/20, the Polish side issued a statement promising to maintain order in the city until the arrival of General Dowbor-Muśnicki’s forces, and expressed the expectation that "all national organizations" would submit to him. This caused outrage among the Belarusians, who viewed the 1st Polish Corps as a threat. The Belarusians sent an inquiry to the Poles about their authority to act and simultaneously sought support from Belarusian units in Vitebsk. When it became clear that no help would come, they dispatched a train to bring the Belarusian 4th Army Corps from the Romanian Front.

On 20 February 1918, the All-Belarusian Congress Council continued its efforts to establish Belarusian state structures in Minsk. The Executive Committee of the Council, expanded the previous day, declared itself the supreme authority in Belarus, under the name Belarusian National Representation. It then formed a government called the People’s Secretariat of Belarus, with 28-year-old former law student Jazep Varonka appointed as its president. Minsk’s Poles refused to recognize the new Belarusian government, and the Polish Council of the Minsk Land completely ignored all Belarusian organizations.

=== Events of February 21 ===
Around midnight between 20 and 21 February, Polish military forces in Minsk received word that the command of the 1st Polish Corps had dispatched two officer legions, with a strength of about 500 men, to aid them. Feeling more secure in their position, at 4:00 AM on February 21, the Poles seized the Warsaw railway station, which was located in the Belarusian zone. However, neither the 1st Polish Corps nor the Belarusian 4th Army Corps managed to reach Minsk before the Germans did.

At 11:00 AM, a reconnaissance unit of German cuirassiers entered the city, followed shortly by additional German forces. Reactions to their arrival varied, but they were generally restrained. Minsk's Jewish residents were especially numerous in welcoming the Germans. The Polish Council of the Minsk Land decided to greet the Germans formally and coolly, avoiding any overt displays of warmth. Together with representatives from right-wing Belarusian groups, they formed a welcoming delegation, including E. Iwaszkiewicz, I. Witkiewicz, and Z. Nagórski from the Polish side, and Raman Skirmunt and P. Aleksiuk from the Belarusian side. The Germans assured them that they had arrived in response to a request from General Dowbor-Muśnicki. The Belarusian-Polish delegates found this unlikely, but despite some reluctance, they agreed to hand over control of Minsk to the Germans, leaving the final decision to the commander of the 1st Polish Corps.

== Aftermath ==
The takeover of Minsk by Belarusian and Polish military units from 19 to 21 February 1918 held significant importance for the Belarusian national movement. It marked one of the first tangible successes for its representatives. The political decisions made during this period – particularly the creation of the first Belarusian government, the Belarusian People's Secretariat – played a crucial role in the birth and development of Belarusian statehood, culminating in the declaration of independence of the Belarusian People's Republic on 25 March 1918. It was also one of the first instances where Belarusian military formations showed initiative, engaged in combat, and fulfilled their duties.

For the Poles, despite occupying the majority of Minsk and pushing the Belarusians into a defensive position, they were unable to leverage their actions politically. Some Poles expressed satisfaction at the arrival of the Germans, considering the Bolsheviks a far greater threat, while others viewed the new occupation as yet another blow to the Polish identity of these lands. Total losses on the Polish side during the operation were minor – one officer and several soldiers were killed, while 17 were wounded.

== Bibliography ==
- Michaluk, Dorota (2010). Białoruska Republika Ludowa 1918–1920. U podstaw białoruskiej państwowości [Belarusian People's Republic 1918–1920. At the Foundations of Belarusian Statehood] (in Polish). Toruń: The Nicolaus Copernicus University Press. ISBN 978-83-231-2484-9.
- Tarasiuk, Dariusz (2007). Między nadzieją a niepokojem. Działalność społeczno-kulturalna i polityczna Polaków na wschodniej Białorusi w latach 1905–1918 [Between Hope and Anxiety. The Socio-Cultural and Political Activity of Poles in Eastern Belarus in the Years 1905–1918] (in Polish). Lublin: Maria Curie-Sklodowska University Press. ISBN 978-83-227-2629-7.
- Łatyszonek, Oleg (1995). Białoruskie formacje wojskowe 1917–1923 [Belarusian Military Formations 1917–1923] (in Polish). Białystok: Białoruskie Towarzystwo Historyczne. ISBN 83-903068-5-9.
