= Nikolay Goloded =

Belarusian revolutionary and Soviet bureaucrat (1894–1937)

- Мікалай Галадзед
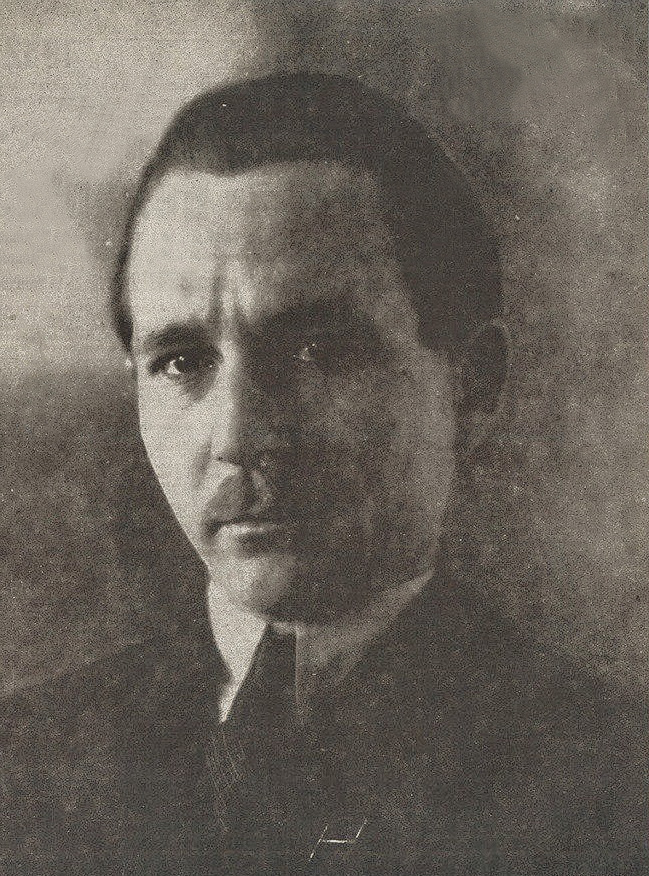
- Goloded in 1932

Chairman of the Council of People's Commissars of the Byelorussian Soviet Socialist Republic
- In office 7 May 1927 – 30 May 1937
- Preceded by: Iosif Adamovich
- Succeeded by: Daniil Volkovich

Second Secretary of the Communist Party of Byelorussia
- In office 12 December 1924 – 1927
- Preceded by: Alexander Krinitsky
- Succeeded by: Vilhelm Knorin

Personal details
- Born: 21 May 1894 Stary Kryvets, Russian Empire
- Died: 21 June 1937 (aged 43) Minsk, Byelorussian SSR, Soviet Union
- Party: Russian Communist Party (1917–1937)
- Other political affiliations: Communist Party of Byelorussia
- Awards: Order of Lenin

Nikolay Matveyevich Goloded (Note: Belarusian: Мікала́й Мацьве́евіч Галадзе́д, romanized: Mikalaj Maciejevič Haladzied; Russian: Никола́й Матве́евич Голоде́д) (21 May 1894 – 21 June 1937) was a Belarusian revolutionary and Soviet bureaucrat who was First Secretary of the Communist Party of Byelorussia from December 1925 to May 1927. He served as Chairman of the Council of People's Commissars of the Byelorussian SSR from 1927 to 30 May 1937.

== Early years ==
Goloded was born into a family of Belarusian peasants in the village of Stary Kryvets, in the Russian Empire's Chernigov Governorate. He worked from the age of seven as a shepherd, farm hand, auxiliary worker, and later as a miner in Kryvorozha. He later graduated from the Byelorussian Agricultural Institute.

In the First World War he served in the Russian army. In 1917, he became close to the Russian Social Democratic Labour Party (Bolsheviks), leading revolutionary agitation and joining the Party in 1918. Due to the risk of the death penalty for anti-government actions, he deserted from the front and returned to Stary Kryvets, where he oversaw the seizure and division of landlord property. He was arrested while engaged in underground work.

He was later involved in combat in the Southwestern Front during the ensuing civil war. He created a Red Guard unit that fought with German troops and troops of the Ukrainian People's Republic.

== Soviet career ==
From 1921 to 1924 he was secretary of the Gorki Regional Committee and in 1924 became a member of the Central Committee of the Communist Party of Byelorussia and later on its second secretary from 1924 to 1927.

From 1927 to 1937 he was Chairman of the Council of People's Commissars of the Byelorussian Soviet Socialist Republic. He was a delegate to the XIV–XVII Congresses of the CPSU(b), and elected as a candidate member of the Central Committee of the party at the XVI and XVII Congresses.

On December 6, 1930, he signed the resolution of the Council of People's Commissars of the BSSR expelling academicians Vaclau Lastouski, Vladimir Picheta, Jazep Losik, Ściapan Niekraševič, Maksim Haretski, and Uladzimir Dubouka from the National Academy of Sciences of Belarus "as enemies of the proletarian revolution". In 1933, he was a member of the Political Commission for the revision of the Russian-Belarusian dictionary and new rules of the Belarusian language.

== Purge and rehabilitation ==
He was arrested on 14 June 1937 during the Great Purge, accused of participating in the right-wing Trotskyist bloc and the Ukrainian national-fascist organization. He was sent to Minsk for interrogation.

Accounts differ as to the manner of his death. According to the official version, he threw himself out of a 5th floor window during interrogation in the building of the Belarusian NKVD. According to unofficial information, he was beaten to death, and then state security officers staged a suicide. According to other reports, he was shot.

In 1956, he was posthumously rehabilitated and reinstated in the Party.

== Awards ==
He was awarded the Order of Lenin in 1935.

== Notes ==
Political offices
Preceded by Iosif Adamovich	Prime Minister of the Byelorussian Soviet Socialist Republic; 1927 – 30 May 1937	Succeeded by Daniil Volkovich
