= Iosif Adamovich =

Belarusian Soviet politician (1897–1937)

- Язэп Адамовіч
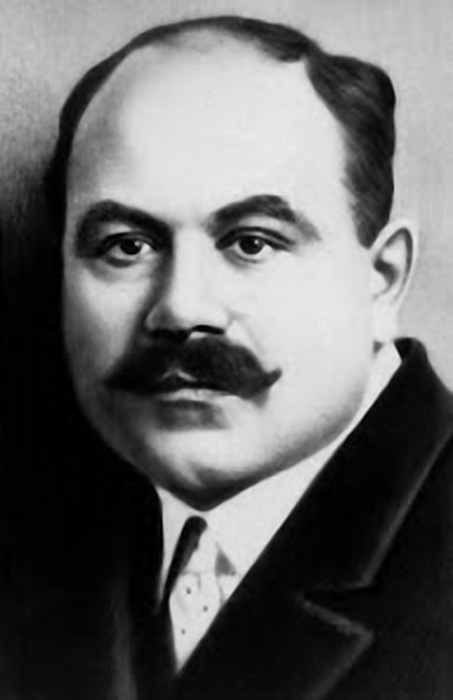

Chairman of the Council of People's Commissars of the Byelorussian Soviet Socialist Republic
- In office 17 March 1924 – 7 May 1927
- Preceded by: Alexander Chervyakov
- Succeeded by: Nikolay Goloded

Personal details
- Born: 7 January 1897 Barysaw, Russian Empire
- Died: 22 April 1937 (aged 40) Minsk, Byelorussian SSR, Soviet Union
- Party: RSDLP (Bolsheviks) (1916–1918); Russian/Soviet Communist Party (1918–1937)

Iosif Alexandrovich Adamovich (Russian: Ио́сиф Алекса́ндрович Адамо́вич; Belarusian: Язэп Адамовіч, romanized: Jazep Adamovič; 7 January 1897 – 22 April 1937) was a Belarusian Soviet politician and statesman.

== Biography ==
He was born in 1897 in Barysaw, in the Minsk Governorate of the Russian Empire, in a working-class family of Belarusian ethnicity. He served as a Prime Minister of the Byelorussian Soviet Socialist Republic from 1924 to 1927. In 1916, he was a member of the Russian Social Democratic Labour Party, where he was organised the Belarusian Bolsheviks.

In 1920, he was commissioner of military affairs of the Byelorussian Soviet Socialist Republic. From 1924 to 1927, he was the Prime Minister of the Byelorussian Soviet Socialist Republic. He was instrumental in the enlargement of the territory of Soviet Belarus in 1924 and 1926.

On 22 April 1937, he reportedly killed himself in Minsk, aged 40.

Political offices
| Preceded by Alexander Chervyakov | Prime Minister of the Byelorussian Soviet Socialist Republic; 1924–1927 | Succeeded by Nikolay Goloded |
