= Vasily Freiman =

Vasily Nikolayevich Freiman (Russian: Василий Николаевич Фрейман) was a Bolshevik politician. He was elected to the Russian Constituent Assembly from the Minsk constituency in late 1917. In December 1917 he was named the People's Commissar for Industry in the Regional Council of People's Commissars of the Western Region and Front. He served as the Simbirsk Governorate People's Commissar for Trade and Industry, then as Commissar for Military Affairs.
