= Alexander Chervyakov =

Belarusian revolutionary and Soviet politician

- Аляксандр Чарвякоў
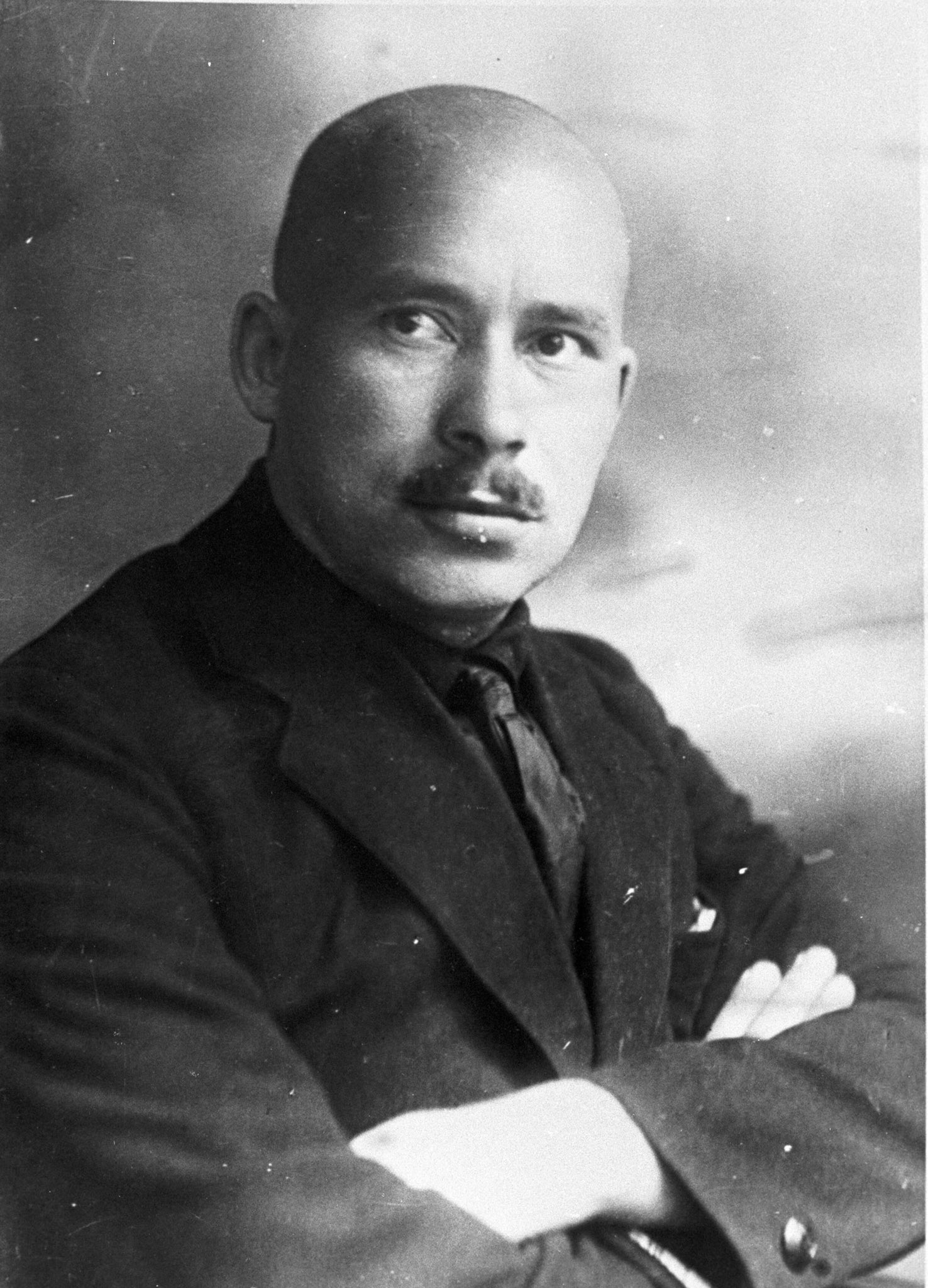
- Chervyakov c. 1920s

Chairman of the Council of People's Commissars of the Byelorussian SSR
- In office 18 December 1920 – 17 March 1924
- Preceded by: Position established
- Succeeded by: Iosif Adamovich

Chairman of the Central Executive Committee of the Byelorussian SSR
- In office 30 December 1924 – 16 June 1937
- Preceded by: Position established
- Succeeded by: Mikhail Stakun

Personal details
- Born: 25 February 1892 Dukora, Igumensky Uyezd, Minsk Governorate, Russian Empire
- Died: 16 June 1937 (aged 45) Minsk, Byelorussian Soviet Socialist Republic, Soviet Union
- Resting place: Military Cemetery
- Party: Russian Communist Party (1917–1937)
- Other political affiliations: Communist Party of Byelorussia

Alexander Grigoryevich Chervyakov (Aliaksandr Charviakou, Belarusian: Аляксандр Рыгоравіч Чарвякоў, Aliaksandr Ryhoravič Čarviakoŭ Russian: Александр Григорьевич Червяков, Aleksandr Grigor'evič Červjakov; 25 February 1892 — 16 June 1937) was a Soviet Politician and revolutionary and one of the founders of the Communist Party of Byelorussia, who eventually became the leader of the Byelorussian Soviet Socialist Republic. Chervyakov became the first chairman of the Belarusian Sovnarkom and in 1918 was appointed as a narkom of Belnatskom (Belarusian Nationality Committee) that was established in the Russian Narkomnat on Nationalities headed by Joseph Stalin.

He is considered an “engine” of the policy of Belarusisation in the 1920s, working to establish a Belarusian national university, preserve cultural artefacts and protect historical monuments.

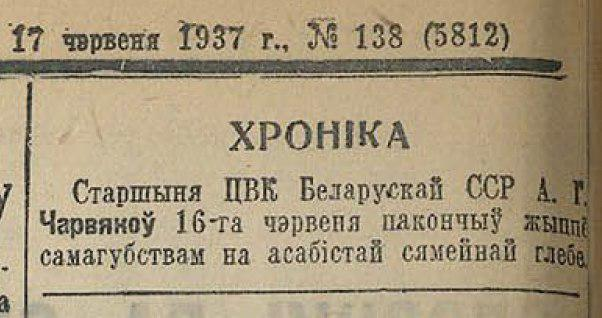
Note about the suicide of Chervyakov in Belarusian newspaper "Zviazda" in 1937

Born at Dukorki in 1892, he joined the Bolshevik Party in May 1917 and began to gain power quickly. He was appointed chairman of the Military Revolutionary Committee of Minsk in 1920, and because of that position, was involved in the creation of the Soviet Union. He was elected as one of the first four Chairmen of the Central Executive Committee of the USSR on 30 December 1922 when the Union of Soviet Socialist Republics was formed. He held that position until he was accused of “anti-Soviet activities” and killed himself on 16 June 1937 in order to avoid Stalin's Great Purge. He was posthumously exonerated during the Khrushchev Thaw in 1957.
