= Innokenty Fedenev =

Innokenty Pavlovich Fedenev (Russian: Иннокентий Павлович Феденев) was an Old Bolshevik. Hailing from Irkutsk, Fedenev was born in 1878. He began working in the Lena mines in 1897. Fedenev joined the Russian Social Democratic Labour Party in 1904. He spent long periods in czarist prisons and was exiled.

He was a delegate at the First All-Russian Congress of Soviets of Workers' and Soldiers' Deputies. He was elected to the Russian Constituent Assembly from the Western Front constituency in late 1917. On 26 November (9 December) 1917 he was named People's Commissar for Finance of the Obliskomzap.

Following the October Revolution he was sent to Minsk, Tambov and Kharkov for party work. In the 1920s he worked in Moscow. He was the organizer and first chairman of the Moscow Workers Inspectorate.

In 1926 he was sent to the Mainak sanatorium in Evpatoria, for treatment for ill health caused by imprisonment and exile. At the sanatorium he befriended Nikolai Ostrovsky, a young civil war veteran with literary ambitions. Fedenev became a mentor for Ostrovsky. In 1932 he helped Ostrovsky get the novel How the Steel Was Tempered published in Molodaya gvardiya. Ostrovsky modelled one of the characters of the novel based on Fedenev - 'Ledenev' who acts as a mentor for the main protagonist Pavel Korchagin.

In October 1941 Fedenev returned to Irkutsk, where he worked at an ammunition factory. He remained active in cultural activities, participating in meetings with students at Irkutsk University. He died in 1946.
