= Daniil Volkovich =

Soviet Belarusian statesman and politician

Danil Ivanavich Volkovich (18 April 1900 – 1937 ) was a Soviet Belarusian statesman and politician who served as the chairman of the Council of People's Commissars of the Byelorussian Soviet Socialist Republic from 30 May to 8 September 1937 and first secretary of the Communist Party of Byelorussia from January 25 to March 14, 1937. He was born in Masty.
