= North-Western Regional Committee of the Russian Communist Party (Bolsheviks) =

Former regional party committee in Soviet Russia

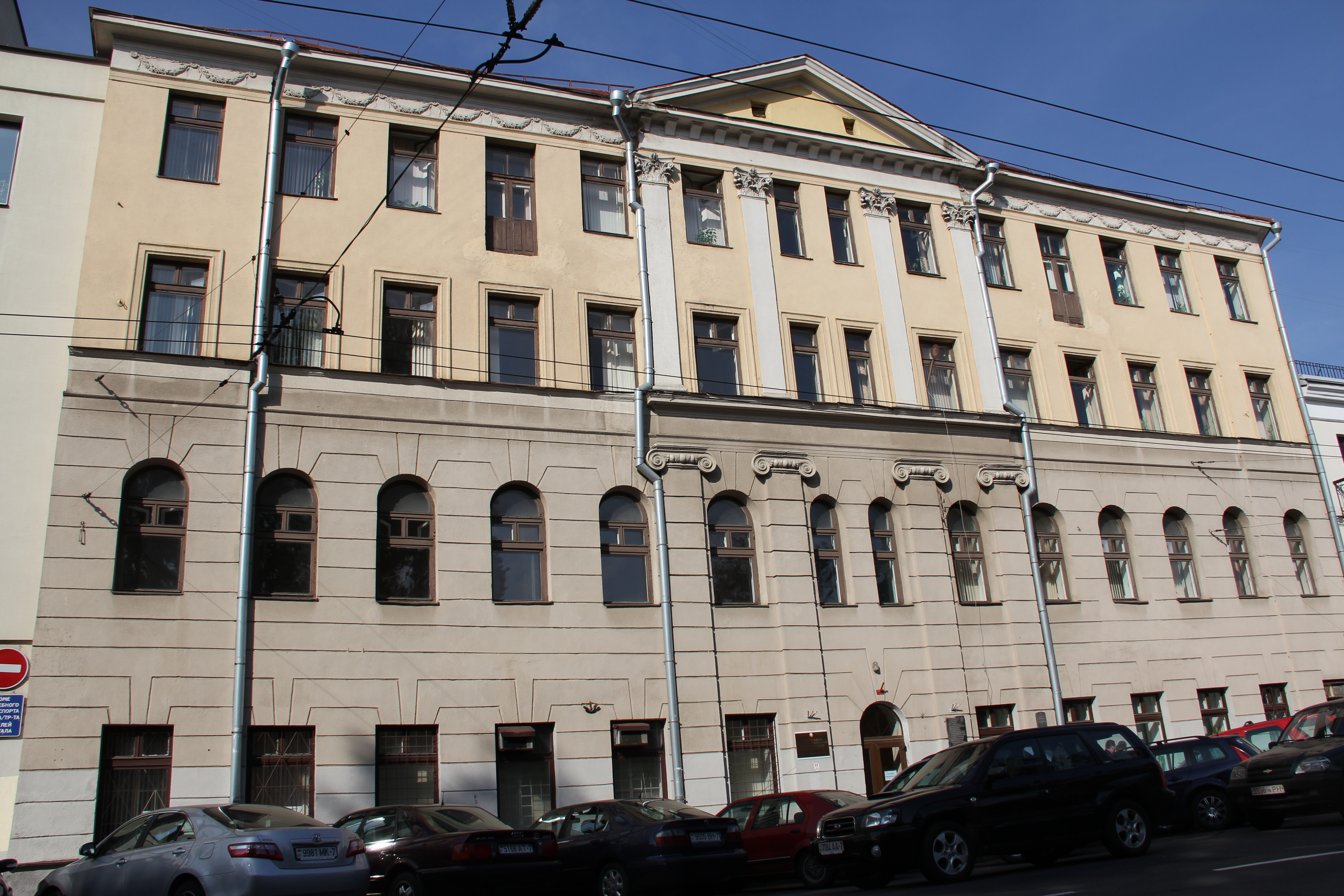
The building in Minsk that housed the offices of North-Western Regional Committee of the Russian Social Democratic Labour Party (Bolsheviks) and the Minsk Soviet (today 6, Leningradskaya Street).

The North-Western Regional Committee of the Russian Communist Party (Bolsheviks), earlier the North-Western Regional Committee of the Russian Social Democratic Labour Party (Bolsheviks), was a regional committee (obkom) of the Bolshevik Party in the Western Region 1917–1918. Alexander Miasnikian was the chairman of the regional committee. Vilhelm Knorin was the secretary of the regional committee. Another leader of the regional committee was Ivan Alibegov.

The first North-Western Regional and Front Party Conference was held in Minsk on September 15, 1917. The Central Committee of the Russian Social Democratic Labour Party (Bolsheviks) had called for the formation of the North-Western Regional Committee in July 1917, but the formation of the regional party organization was delayed due to the Kornilov affair. The conference called on workers to prepare for armed uprising. At the time of the first regional conference, the party had some 9,190 members in the region.

The committee, directly subordinate to the Central Committee of the Russian Social Democratic Labour Party (Bolsheviks), was active in the Minsk Governorate, Mogilev Governorate, Vitebsk Governorate, some parts of the Vilna Governorate and all of the Western Front. The committee actively worked to prepare workers and soldiers for the coming armed uprising. An extraordinary regional party conference was held October 5–7, 1917 in Minsk. By that time, the party in the region counted 28,591 party members and 27,856 sympathizers.

In February 1918 the North-Western Regional Committee was evacuated to Smolensk, along with the Soviet authorities. From Smolensk, the committee organized a network for clandestine activities in the Belarusian lands under German occupation. The committee developed an underground network of distribution of literature to German soldiers.

The sixth North-Western Regional Conference of the Russian Communist Party (Bolsheviks) was held in Smolensk December 30–31, 1918. 206 delegates, representing 17,771 party members, took part in the event. Delegations came from Minsk Governorate, Mogilev Governorate, Vitebsk Governorate, Smolensk Governorate and parts of Vilna Governorate and Chernigov Governorate. The meeting announced the foundation of the Communist Party (Bolsheviks) of Belorussia. The North-Western Regional Committee ceased to exist, and the conference would subsequently be known as the First Congress of the Communist Party (Bolsheviks) of Belorussia.

== See also ==
- Obliskomzap
