= First All-Belarusian Congress =

1917 meeting of Belarusian nationalists

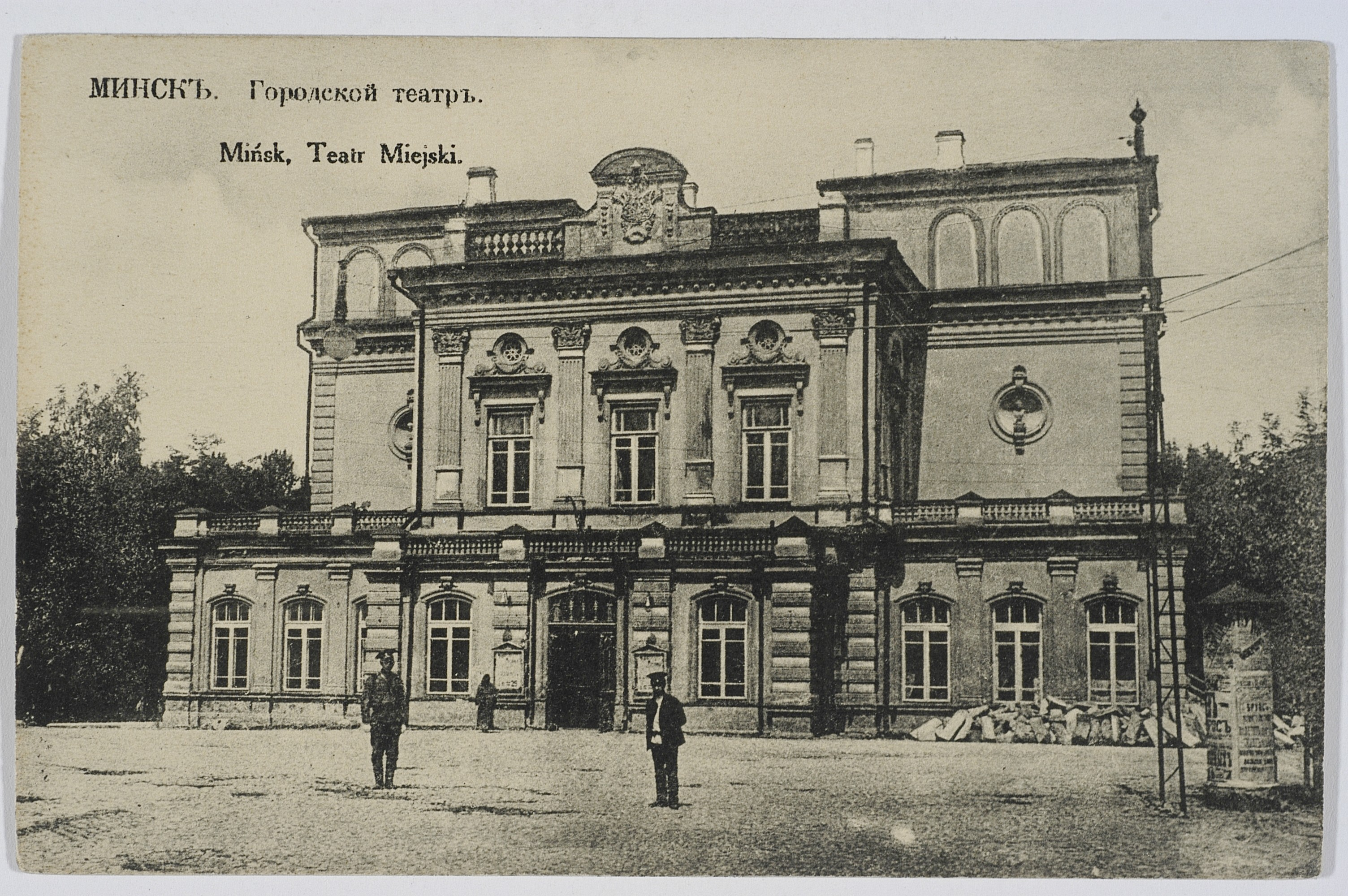
Minsk City Theatre, the main venue of the congress

The First All-Belarusian Congress (Belarusian: Першы Ўсебеларускі кангрэс/Першая Ўсебеларуская канферэнцыя, romanized: Pieršy Ŭsiebiełaruski kanhres/Pieršaja Ŭsiebiełaruskaja kanferencyja) was a congress of Belarusian political organizations and groups held between 18 and 31 December 1917 (O.S. 5–18 December) in Minsk. The Congress gathered 1872 delegates from all regions of Belarus. It played an important role in the consolidation of the Belarusian national movement after the Bolshevik Revolution in the Russian Republic. The Congress deliberated various proposals, and reached a compromise solution, based oh the right of self-determination: it approved the republican form of governance and opposed any division of Belarus, but also opted against total separation from the Russian democratic federal republic, thus implying Belarusian support for new political solutions, based on principles of democracy, republicanism and federalization. In spite of that, the Congress was violently dispersed in the early hours of 31 December (O.S. 18 December) by the pro-unitarist local Bolshevik authorities of the Western Oblast.

Opposing the dissolution of the Congress, a major group of prominent delegates met in secret by the end of the same day and elected the All-Belarusian Council, as a representative political body that also met in secret on 2 January 1918 (O.S. 20 December 1917) and elected the Executive Committee, that consisted of seventeen members. Various delegates of the Congress and members of the Council also hoped that central authorities in Petrograd would not condone repressive actions of local Bolshevik authorities in Minsk, but it turned out that the central Council of People's Commissars was also not ready to support political solutions based on self-determination and federal status of Belarus.

During January and February 1918, prominent delegates of the Congress who were members of the All-Belarusian Council and the Executive Committee continued to work in secret, until the retreat of Bolshevik authorities from Minsk on 18 February, that was caused by the German invasion of Belarus. During the short provisional Belarusian-Polish administration of Minsk (19-21 February), the All-Belarusian Council transformed into the Rada of the Belarusian People's Republic, that was proclaimed on 21 February 1918.

== Background ==
In early 1917 Belarus was still part of the Russian Empire. Following the February and October Revolutions in Russia, the Bolsheviks who came to power promised free self-determination to all nations living in the former Russian Empire, including the possibility of gaining full independence. Belarusian political organizations, representing regions with a Belarusian majority population, decided to hold a conference in order to work out a unitary position regarding the future of Belarus. The Supreme Belarusian Council, a coalition consolidating Belarusian organizations, was the organizer of the conference.

== The congress ==
A total of 1872 delegates came to the conference, representing all regions of Belarus. The delegates were representatives of various social and political organizations, local governments, trade unions, as well as of refugees to Russia, soldiers of the Russian army and diasporas in Petrograd and Moscow.

The congress elected the Council of the First All-Belarusian Congress of members under the leadership of Jan Sierada. The Council, in turn, formed an executive committee which was to serve as the organizing body in the process of establishing a modern constitutional democratic Belarusian state.

There were active discussions on various topics of the future of Belarus, with the main question being the future form of state of Belarus. Right wing-leaning delegates and many delegates from western Belarus insisted on immediately declaring full independence of Belarus from Russia. Left-leaning delegates and delegates from the eastern regions of Belarus opposed this idea. Many of them proposed that Belarus establish itself as an entity within a democratic Russian Federation.

In the night of 18 December 1917, the delegates adopted the first items of the final resolution, declaring Belarus a democratic republic but without yet defining its status in relation with Russia. At this point Bolshevik soldiers violently interrupted the conference and arrested several participants.

== Aftermath ==
The executive committee of the congress' council managed to maintain its activity in the underground up until Minsk was taken over by German forces in February 1918. It later transformed into the Rada of the Belarusian Democratic Republic (Rada BNR) and declared the independence of Belarus in March 1918. The Rada BNR later held negotiations with various foreign governments regarding international recognition of the independence of Belarus and still exists in exile today.

According to Belarusian authors, the congress has managed to bring the question of Belarus on the international agenda. In particular, the Soviets were criticized for dispersing the conference at the Soviet-German Brest-Litovsk peace conference and in a few articles in German, Swiss and Russian non-Bolshevik media.

According to a widespread view in Belarus, the conference had a pivotal meaning for the Belarusian independence movement, the future establishment of the Belarusian Democratic Republic and later the Belarusian Soviet Republic.

In February 1919, the Bolsheviks held their own conference with an almost identical name, the First All-Belarusian Congress of the Soviets of Worker, Peasant and Red army Soldier Deputies, at the same venue as the First All-Belarusian Congress. The Soviet Congress adopted the constitution of the Soviet Socialist Republic of Belarus.

== See also ==
- History of Belarus
- Western Oblast (1917–1918)
- Belarusian-Soviet conflict
- Belarusian-Polish administration of Minsk
- 1918 German invasion of Belarus
- Belarusian People's Republic
- Vilnius Conference

== Sources ==
- Kasmach, Lizaveta (2023). Belarusian Nation-Building in Times of War and Revolution. Budapest: Central European University Press.
- Sukiennicki, Wiktor (1965). "Stalin and Byelorussia's Independence". The Polish Review. 10 (4): 84–107.
- Sukiennicki, Wiktor (1984). East Central Europe During World War I: From Foreign Domination to National Independence. Boulder: East European Monographs.
