= Polish Civil Guard =

Polish Civil Guard at the Polish Committee for Public Security in Lithuanian Minsk
- Polska Straż Obywatelska przy Polskim Komitecie Bezpieczeństwa Publicznego w Mińsku Litewskim
- Active: October 26 (November 8 O.S.), 1917 – January 1918
- Role: securing the lives and property of Minsk residents
- Garrison/HQ: Minsk, Soviet Russia

Commanders
- Only commander: Stanisław Chrząstowski

The Polish Civil Guard at the Polish Committee for Public Security in Lithuanian Minsk (Polish: Polska Straż Obywatelska przy Polskim Komitecie Bezpieczeństwa Publicznego w Mińsku Litewskim) was a Polish paramilitary organization operating in Minsk (at the time called "Lithuanian Minsk" by Poles to distinguish from Mińsk Mazowiecki), initially with the knowledge and consent of the Bolshevik authorities, and from January 1918 underground.

The Polish Citizens' Guard was established on October 26 (November 8, 1917 O.S.) in Minsk at the initiative of the local Polish community. On that day, a founding meeting was held, at which its regulations were adopted and its leadership was elected. The organization was headed by the former mayor of Minsk, Stanisław Chrząstowski, with Władysław Olewiński and Bolshevik sympathizer Jan Baryła serving as his deputies. The Guard's declared primary goal was to protect the lives and property of the city's residents. Initially, it operated officially, with the consent of the Bolshevik revolutionary authorities.

On January 18, 1918, Jan Baryła issued an order to disarm the organization. On January 23, a clandestine meeting of the Citizens' Guard Staff (without Baryła) with members of the Public Security Committee of the Polish Council of the Minsk Region took place. The decision was made that the Polish Citizens' Guard should go underground and continue secret military training for its members.

== Bibliography ==
- Tarasiuk, Dariusz (2007). Między nadzieją a niepokojem. Działalność społeczno-kulturalna i polityczna Polaków na wschodniej Białorusi w latach 1905–1918 [Between Hope and Anxiety. The Socio-Cultural and Political Activity of Poles in Eastern Belarus in the Years 1905–1918] (in Polish). Lublin: Maria Curie-Sklodowska University Press. ISBN 978-83-227-2629-7.
