= Obliskomzap =

Early Soviet governing body

Obliskomzap (Russian: Облискомзап), short for Regional Executive Committee of the Soviets of Workers, Soldiers and Peasants Deputies of the Western Region and Front (Russian: Областной исполнительный комитет Советов рабочих, солдатских и крестьянских депутатов Западной области и фронта, romanized: Oblastnoy ispolnitel'nyy komitet Sovetov rabochikh, soldatskikh i krest'yanskikh deputatov Zapadnoy oblasti i fronta), was an organ for Soviet power in the Western Region (from September 1918, the Western Commune) claiming governing authority in the Belarusian lands not under German or Austro-Hungarian occupation from late 1917 throughout 1918. It was to function as the highest body of legislative power, between the holding of congresses of soviets, in the governorates of Vitebsk, Mogilev, Minsk, Vilna (except areas under German occupation) and Smolensk (the latter was included in April 1918). A Regional Council of People's Commissars was formed as the corresponding executive branch of government.

== Formation of Obliskomzap ==
The formation of Obliskomzap was preceded by the Regional Congress of Soviets of Worker and Soldiers Deputies, the Second Congress of Soldier Deputies of the Armies of the Western Front and the Third Congress of Soviets of Peasant Deputies of Minsk and Vilna Governorates. These three platforms merged into one through the formation of Obliskomzap. The agreement was that Obliskomzap would consist of 100 representatives from the Front Committee of the Western Front, 35 representatives from the Executive Committee of the Regional Congress of Soviets of Workers and Soldiers Deputies, 35 representatives from the executive committee of the Regional Congress of Soviets of Peasants Deputies, 11 representatives from trade unions, 4 representatives from the Railway Workers Union and 2 representatives from the Post and Telecommunication Employees Union. There were however several vacant seats in the new governing body - at the formation of Obliskomzap the Regional Congress of Soviets had left 18 seats vacant to be able to accommodate new soviets in the future. Most of the trade unions affiliated with the Central Bureau of Trade Unions did not send any representatives to Obliskomzap, nor did the unions of railway workers and employees of the Libau–Romny Railway and the Aleksandrovskaya Railway or the Post and Telegraph Employees Union. Obliskomzap lacked representatives from the Vitebsk and Mogilev governorates.

At the time of its formation Obliskomzap consisted of 113 Bolsheviks, 24 Left Socialist-Revolutionaries, 6 Right Socialist-Revolutionaries, 4 Mensheviks, 3 Menshevik-Internationalists and 2 Poale-Zionists. Among the Bolsheviks, the vast majority (80 members) represented the Front Committee of the Western Front.

== First plenary and election of the Obliskomzap Presidium ==
The first plenary of Obliskomzap was held in Minsk on November 26 (December 9), 1917. A five-member Presidium was elected, consisting of Nikolai Rogozinsky (chairman), Nikolai Krivoshein (deputy chairman), P. I. Kozlov (deputy chairman), P. Osipov (secretary) and Ivan Alibegov (secretary). The deputy chairman Kozlov belonged to the Left Socialist-Revolutionaries, the other four Presidium members were Bolsheviks. From January 17 (30), 1918 the chairmanship of the Presidium of Obliskomzap was taken over by Alexander Miasnikian.

== Regional Council of People's Commissars ==
Fifteen departments were instituted, including the Departments for Military Affairs, Internal Affairs, Food, Nationalities, Land, Labour, Industry and Trade, Public Education, Justice, Railways, Public Charity and Post and Telegraphs. Each department was to be headed by a People's Commissar. A Regional Council of People's Commissars of the Western Region and Front was set up, modelled after the Council of People's Commissars of the Russian Soviet Federative Socialist Republic. The Regional Council of People's Commissars was chaired by Kārlis Landers, who was also in charge of Internal Affairs. Other People's Commissars named were Miasnikian (Military Affairs), Moses Kalmanovich (Food); Innokenty Fedenev (Finance), S. I. Berson (Nationalities), Alibegov (Labour), N. M. Daineko (Land), Vasily Freiman (Industry) and Lev Gromashevsky (Education). Daineko represented the Left Socialist-Revolutionaries in the Regional Council of People's Commissars. Berson had been a member of the Minsk Branch Bureau of the Social Democracy of the Kingdom of Poland and Lithuania, but joined the Bolsheviks in October 1917. Other People's Commissars hailed from Bolshevik ranks. The posts for People's Commissars for the Postal and Railways departments were left vacant for their respective trade unions.

The Left Socialist-Revolutionaries felt that they deserved two or three additional People's Commissars, based on their party holding 24 seats in Obliskomzap. In early December negotiations took place. Initially the Left Socialist-Revolutionaries asked that Kozlov would get the Post and Telegraph department and Anisimov the Railways department. They also wanted the Justice or Public Education department. Initially the Bolsheviks seemed willing to give away the Post and Telegraph department, but then reverted their position. Instead the Left Socialist-Revolutionaries got the slot of People's Commissar for Public Charity (social security) and on December 3, 1918, the plenary session of Obliskomzap unanimously elected Left Socialist-Revolutionary V. L. Mukha to the post. Kozlov, Daineko and Mukha were the sole Belarusians in the Obliskomzap government.

== Commissions and publishing activity ==
Three commissions were established under Obliskomzap - Editorial, Information and Communication and Economy. Obliskomzap published the newspapers Sovetskaya Pravda ('Soviet Truth'), Izvestiya Obliskomzap ('Obliskomzap News') and Izvestiya Zapadnaya Kommuny ('Western Commune News').

== Obliskomzap in Minsk ==
Obliskomzap took control over areas vacated by the German X Army. However, before their withdrawal the German High Command was trying to arm anti-Bolshevik groups - a move that caused tensions between Obliskomzap and the Germans. The political-military leadership of the Western Region and Western Front was coordinated between Obliskomzap, the North-Western Regional Committee of the Russian Social Democratic Labour Party (Bolsheviks) and the Military-Revolutionary Committee of the Western Front. Obliskomzap proceeded to implement policies of the Soviet Russian government, such as nationalizations of industries, implementation of 8-hour work day and the Decree on Land.

Obliskomzap had a tense relationship with the Byelorussian Regional Committee (BOK), a grouping that sought to convene an All-Belarusian Congress as move towards forming an autonomous or independent Belarusian government. Obliskomzap and the North-Western Regional Committee of the Russian Social Democratic Labour Party (Bolsheviks) saw the BOK as threat and wished to block the holding of the planned event, but the All-Belarusian Congress had the backing from the Soviet Russian government in Petrograd. Obliskomzap had issued a ban on any holding of congresses and meetings in the region, based on a directive from Leo Trotsky. Joseph Stalin, the (All-Russian) People's Commissar for Nationalities, sought to mediate and gathered a meeting at Smolny in early December 1918 to discuss 'the Belarusian question'. Stalin, Miasnikian, Vilhelm Knorin and BOK leader E. S. Kancher participated in the meeting. The Obliskomzap side argued that no security guarantees would be given for the All-Belarusian Congress but that they wouldn't block it by force. Furthermore, they affirmed that, based on the arguments of Trotsky, no handover of governing authority would happen in the region until the conclusion of the Brest-Litovsk talks and the convening of the Russian Constituent Assembly. In the end Obliskomzap was pressured by the Council of People's Commissars of the Russian Socialist Federative Soviet Republic and the Central Committee of the Russian Social Democratic Labour Party (Bolsheviks) to accept concessions to the BOK.

A second round of negotiations between Obliskomzap and BOK was held in Minsk December 8–10, 1917. An agreement was reached whereby Obliskomzap would provide the meeting venue, logistics and security for the All-Belarusian Congress to be held December 15–25, 1917. Obliskomzap would be allocated ten voting delegates at the event, and Obliskomzap representatives would deliver a number of reports to the sessions of the congress. After BOK and Obliskom had agreed on the terms, the agreement was signed by Vladimir Lenin (Chairman of the Council of People's Commissars of the Russian Socialist Federative Soviet Republic), Yakov Sverdlov (Chairman of the All-Russian Central Executive Committee) and Stalin (People's Commissar for Nationalities).

The First All-Belarusian Congress was finally convened in Minsk starting December 15, 1917. The congress adopted a declaration that recognized Obliskomzap solely as a provisional military entity, not as an organ of territorial government. In response the Regional Council of People's Commissars ordered the meeting to be dispersed in the night between December 17 and 18, 1917. The BOK leaders travelled to Petrograd, to complain to Stalin over the events in Minsk. Stalin summoned the Obliskomzap leadership to the capital, ordered the release of detained Congress delegates and Lenin reassured the BOK leadership of the possibility of holding a Second All-Belarusian Congress.

== Evacuation to Smolensk ==
Obliskomzap was driven out of Minsk by German troops on February 19, 1918, whereby it relocated to Smolensk. After the evacuation Kozlov was moved to post of People's Commissar for National Economy. He was replaced as Presidium deputy chairman by fellow Left Socialist-Revolutionary P. Irov. K. Smirnov replaced Mukha (who resigned in protest over the break-up of the First All-Belarusian Congress) as People's Commissar for Public Charity. Left Socialist-Revolutionary L. Kotlyarevsky became Acting People's Commissar.

== National question ==
After the Brest-Litovsk Treaty the Belarusian People's Republic (BNR) was established under German occupation, governed by the Rada (Council) elected by the First All-Belarusian Congress. The leadership of Obliskomzap perceived the Western Region as a strictly territorial unit within Soviet Russia, rejecting demands for Belarusian autonomy as expressions of separatism and bourgeois nationalism. Unlike the Byelorussian National Commissariat (Belnatskom), Obliskomzap did not consider Belarusian autonomy necessary to counter the influence of the BNR.

However, during the course of 1918 the Belnatskom position gained increasing influence In the wake of the November Revolution in Germany the possibility of recovery of territories lost after Brest-Litovsk emerged, which brought the national question to the forefront. On December 21–23, 1918 a conference of the Byelorussian Sections of the Russian Communist Party (Bolsheviks) was held in Moscow - which adopted a declaration calling for the formation of a Provisional Workers and Peasants Government of Byelorussia. On December 24, 1918, the Central Committee of the Russian Communist Party (Bolsheviks) approved of the formation of a Byelorussian soviet republic. The Central Bureau of the Byelorussian Sections of the Russian Communist Party (Bolsheviks) prepared to shift to Minsk. Aware of the discussions in Moscow, the Obliskomzap Presidium chairman Miasnikian traveled to Moscow to meet with Stalin. Stalin was swayed, and agreed to instruct the Central Bureau of the Byelorussian Sections to agree on a joint ministerial list with Obliskomzap for the new soviet republic. On December 30, 1918, the Sixth North-Western Regional Conference of the Russian Communist Party (Bolsheviks) declared the foundation of the Communist Party (Bolsheviks) of Byelorussia.

== Dissolution of Obliskomzap and creation of the Byelorussian Soviet Republic ==
On 1 January 1919, a Provisional Workers and Peasants Government of the Socialist Soviet Republic of Byelorussia was formed, with 12 representatives from the Obliskomzap and 7 representatives from the Belnatskom and the Byelorussian Sections of the Russian Communist Party (Bolsheviks). On 3 January 1919, Obliskomzap issued a declaration whereby it dissolved itself and transferred all authority to the new soviet government. On 11 January 1919, the All-Russian Central Executive Committee approved the dissolution of Obliskomzap and the formation of the new soviet republic.
