= Byelorussian Soviet Socialist Republic =

Soviet republic from 1920 to 1991

Coordinates: 54.0000°N 29.0000°E

Byelorussian Socialist Soviet Republic (1920–1936) Беларуская Сацыялістычная Савецкая Рэспубліка (Belarusian) Белорусская Социалистическая Советская Республика (Russian) Byelorussian Soviet Socialist Republic (1936–1991) Беларуская Савецкая Сацыялістычная Рэспубліка (Belarusian) Белорусская Советская Социалистическая Республика (Russian)
- 1920–1991 (Note: It was part of Reichskommissariat Ostland from 1941–1944, under German occupation, as Nazi Germany also occupied the Baltics, as well as the Ukrainian SSR as Reichskommissariat Ukraine)
- Flag (1951–1991) State emblem (1981–1991)
- Motto: Пралетарыі ўсіх краін, яднайцеся! Pralietaryi ŭsich krain, jadnajciesia! "Workers of the world, unite!"
- Anthem: Дзяржаўны гімн Беларускай Савецкай Сацыялiстычнай Рэспублiкi; Dziaržaŭny himn Biełaruskaj Savieckaj Sacyjalistyčnaj Respubliki "Anthem of the Byelorussian Soviet Socialist Republic" (1955–1991)
- Location of Byelorussia (red) within the Soviet Union (red and white) between 1956 and 1991
- Status: 1920–1922: Nominally independent state (satellite state of the Russian SFSR); 1922–1990: Union Republic of the Soviet Union; 1990–1991: Union Republic with priority of the Byelorussian legislation
- Capital: Minsk
- Official languages: Belarusian; Russian
- Recognised languages: Polish; Ukrainian; Yiddish (Note: In interwar Soviet Belarus, between 1924 and 1938, four languages were official, namely, Belarusian, Polish, Russian and Yiddish.)
- Religion: Secular state (de jure) State atheism (de facto); Belarusian Orthodox Church (autonomy granted by the Moscow Patriarchate) (majority)
- Demonyms: Byelorussian, Soviet
- Government: Communist state (1920–1990); Parliamentary republic (1990–1991)
- First Secretary
  - 1920–1923 (first): Vilgelm Knorin
  - 1988–1990 (last): Yefrem Sokolov
- Head of state
  - 1920–1937 (first): Alexander Chervyakov
  - 1989–1991: Nikolai Dementey
  - 1991 (last): Stanislav Shushkevich (acting)
- Head of government
  - 1920–1924 (first): Alexander Chervyakov
  - 1990–1991 (last): Vyacheslav Kebich
- Legislature: Congress of Soviets (1920–1938); Supreme Soviet (1938–1991)
- History
  - Republic proclaimed: 31 July 1920
  - USSR created: 30 December 1922
  - Annexation of Western Belarus: 15 November 1939
  - UN membership: 24 October 1945
  - State sovereignty: 27 July 1990
  - Independence declared: 25 August 1991
  - Renamed to the Republic of Belarus: 19 September 1991
  - International recognition of Belarus (dissolution of the Soviet Union): 26 December 1991

Area
  - Total: 207,600 km^{2} (80,200 sq mi)
  - Water (%): 2.26%

Population
  - 1990 estimate: 10,189,348
  - 1989 census: 10,199,709
- GDP (PPP): 1990 estimate
  - Total: $53.19 billion
  - Per capita: $5,220.5
- GDP (nominal): 1990 estimate
  - Total: ~$17.39 billion
  - Per capita: $1,706.6
- Currency: Soviet rouble (Rbl) (SUR)
- Calling code: +7 015/016/017/02
Preceded by
Socialist Soviet Republic of Lithuania and Belorussia
Second Polish Republic
Reichskommissariat Ostland
Bezirk Bialystok
Reichskommissariat Ukraine
Succeeded by
Republic of Belarus
- Today part of: Belarus; Lithuania (Note: Some parts, e.g., Švenčionys, Šalčininkai, Dieveniškės, Adutiškis, Druskininkai, were annexed in 1939 from Poland to Byelorussia, but passed to Lithuania in 1940); Poland; Russia

The Byelorussian Soviet Socialist Republic (Note: Also spelled Belorussian Soviet Socialist Republic or Belarusian Soviet Socialist Republic.) (Note: Belarusian: Беларуская Савецкая Сацыялістычная Рэспубліка, romanized: Biełaruskaja Savieckaja Sacyjalistyčnaja Respublika; Russian: Белорусская Советская Социалистическая Республика, romanized: Belorusskaya Sovetskaya Sotsialisticheskaya Respublika.) (BSSR), also known as the Byelorussian SSR, (Note: Belarusian: Беларуская ССР, romanized: Biełaruskaja SSR; Russian: Белорусская ССР, romanized: Belorusskaya SSR) Byelorussia, or simply Belarus, was a communist state from 1920 to 1922 and then one of fifteen constituent republics of the Soviet Union (USSR) from 1922 to 1991, with its own legislation from 1990 to 1991. The republic was ruled by the Communist Party of Byelorussia. It was also known as the White Russian Soviet Socialist Republic. Minsk was the capital and largest city of the republic.

Following the Treaty of Brest-Litovsk in March 1918, which ended Russia's involvement in World War I, the Belarusian Democratic Republic (BDR) was proclaimed under German occupation; however, as German troops left, the Socialist Soviet Republic of Byelorussia was established in its place by the Bolsheviks in December, and it was later merged with the Lithuanian Soviet Socialist Republic in 1919 to form the Socialist Soviet Republic of Lithuania and Belorussia, which ceased to exist as a result of the Polish occupation during the Polish–Soviet War. Following a peace treaty with Lithuania, the Socialist Soviet Republic of Byelorussia was re-founded on 31 July 1920 and later became known as the Byelorussian Soviet Socialist Republic.

The BSSR became one of the four founding members of the Soviet Union in December 1922, together with the republics of Russia, Transcaucasia, and Ukraine. Byelorussia was one of several Soviet republics occupied by Nazi Germany during World War II. It was one of the most developed and prosperous Soviet republics, due to its advanced manufacturing industry and agriculture. The BSSR overall was a net exporter, being a notable producer of consumer electronics, processed agricultural goods, potash, fertilizer, machinery, grain and military equipment. It was also one of the more advanced republics in terms of education and technological expertise. Towards the final years of the Soviet Union's existence, the Supreme Soviet of the Byelorussian SSR adopted the Declaration of State Sovereignty in 1990. In the referendum held on 17th March 1991, nearly 84% of the population voted in favor of preserving the USSR. Despite this, on 25 August 1991, the Byelorussian SSR declared independence, and on 19 September it was renamed the Republic of Belarus. The Soviet Union would eventually be formally dissolved on 26 December 1991.

Geographically, the Byelorussian SSR after 1945 was bordered by the Russian SFSR to the east and northeast, Ukraine to the south, Poland to the west, and Lithuania and Latvia to the northwest. The republic spanned an area of 207,600 square kilometres (80,200 sq mi) with a population of 10 million as of 1989. Belarusians formed the majority of the population, followed by significant minorities of Russians, Poles, Ukrainians and Jews. The official languages of the BSSR were Belarusian and Russian.

== Terminology ==
The term Byelorussia (Russian: Белору́ссия), derives from the term Belaya Rus', i.e., White Rus'. There are several claims to the origin of the name White Rus'. An ethno-religious theory suggests that the name was used to describe the part of old Ruthenian lands within the Grand Duchy of Lithuania that had been populated mostly by early Christianized Slavs, as opposed to Black Ruthenia, which was predominantly inhabited by pagan Balts.

The latter part is similar but spelled and stressed differently from Росси́я (Russia), first rose in the days of the Russian Empire, and the Russian Tsar was usually styled "the Tsar of All the Russias", as Russia or the Russian Empire was formed by three parts of Russia—the Great, Little, and White. This asserted that the territories are all Russian and all the peoples are also Russian; in the case of the Belarusians, that they were variants of the Russian people.

Following the Bolshevik Revolution in 1917, the term "White Russia" caused some confusion as it became the name of the so-called White military force that opposed the Red Bolsheviks. During the period of the Byelorussian SSR, the term Byelorussia was embraced as part of a national consciousness. In western Belarus, under Polish control until World War II, Byelorussia became commonly used in the regions of Białystok and Grodno. Upon the establishment of the Byelorussian Soviet Socialist Republic in 1920, the term Byelorussia (its names in other languages such as English being based on the Russian form) was only used officially. In 1936, with the proclamation of the 1936 Soviet Constitution, the republic was renamed to the Byelorussian Soviet Socialist Republic. In English, it was also known as the White Russian Soviet Socialist Republic.

On 19 September 1991 the Supreme Soviet of the Byelorussian SSR renamed the Soviet republic to the Republic of Belarus, with the short form "Belarus". Conservative forces in the newly independent Belarus did not support the name change and opposed its inclusion in the 1991 draft of the Constitution of Belarus.

== History ==
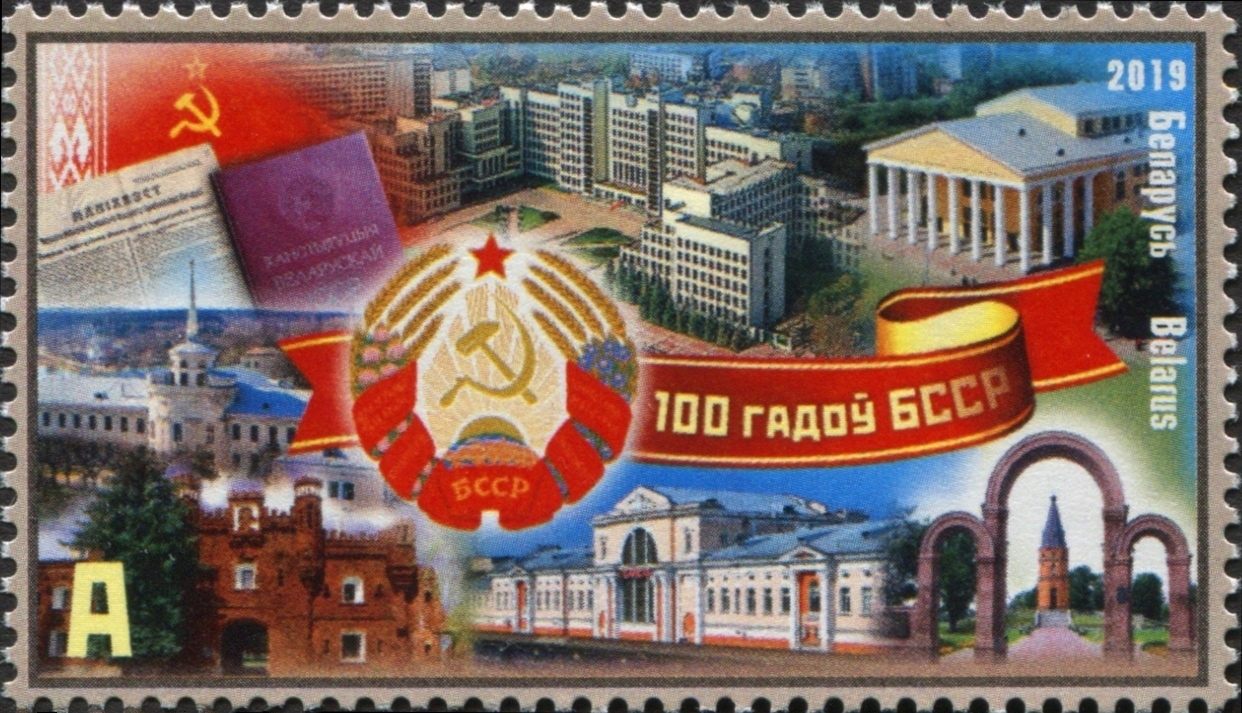
A 2019 stamp dedicated to the 100th anniversary of the BSSR

=== Beginning ===
Prior to the First World War, the territories of modern-day Belarus were part of the Russian Empire, which it gained from the Partitions of Poland more than a century earlier. During the war, the Great Retreat in the Western Front in August–September 1915 ended with the lands of Grodno Governorate and most of Vilna Governorate being occupied by Germany. The resulting front, passing at 100 kilometres to the west of Minsk, remained static towards the end of the conflict, despite Russian attempts to break it at the Lake Naroch offensive in late spring 1916, and General Alexei Evert's inconclusive thrust around the city of Baranovichi in the summer of that year, during the Brusilov offensive further south, in western Ukraine.

The abdication of Nicholas II in light of the February Revolution in Russia in February 1917, activated a rather dormant political life in Belarus. As central authority waned, different political and ethnic groups strived for greater self-determination and even secession from the increasingly ineffective Russian Provisional Government. The momentum picked up after the incompetent actions of the 10th Army during the ill-fated Kerensky offensive during the summer. Representatives of Belarusian regions and of different (mostly left-wing) newly established political powers, including the Belarusian Socialist Assembly, the Christian democratic movement and the General Jewish Labour Bund, formed a Belarusian Central Council. However, the national parties in Belarus were unable to secure mass support, and the nationalist movement was confined to a small, divided and ineffective intelligentsia.

Towards the autumn, political stability continued to shake, and countering the rising nationalist tendencies, were the soviets led by Bolsheviks when the October Revolution hit Russia; that same day, on 25 October (7 November) 1917, the Minsk Soviet of Workers' and Soldiers' Deputies took over the administration of the city. The Bolshevik All-Russian Council of Soviets declared the creation of the Western Oblast, which unified the Vilna, Vitebsk, Mogilev and Minsk governorates that were not occupied by the German army, to administer the Belarusian lands in the frontal zone. On 26 November (6 December), the executive committee of Workers', Peasants' and Soldiers' Deputies for the Western Oblast was merged with the Western front's executive committee, creating a single Obliskomzap. During the autumn of 1917 and winter of 1918, the Western Oblast was headed by Aleksandr Myasnikyan as the head of the Western Oblast's Military Revolutionary Committee, who passed this duty on to Kārlis Landers. Myasnikyan took over as chair of the Russian Social Democratic Labour Party's (RSDRP(b)) committee for the Western Oblast and Moses Kalmanovich as the chair of the Obliskomzap.

Countering this, the Belarusian Central Council reorganised itself as the Belarusian National Council (Rada), and started working on establishing governmental institutions, and discarded the Obliskomzap as a military formation, rather than governmental. As a result, on 7 (20) December, when the first All-Belarusian Congress convened, the Minsk Bolsheviks commanded the pro-Soviet troops to disbanded it. Following this, they proclaimed the rule of soviets dominated by the Bolsheviks. The first Soviet government in Belarus was established at the end of December by communist organs in Minsk with the support of Russian troops of the Western Front. However, its authority only extended to the regions occupied by pro-communist forces and the major cities, where the local soviets followed Bolshevik leadership.

=== German involvement ===
The Russo-German front in Belarus remained static since 1915 and formal negotiations began only on 19 November (2 December N.S.), when the Soviet delegation traveled to the German-occupied city of Brest-Litovsk. A cease-fire was quickly agreed and proper peace negotiations began in December.

However, the German party soon went back on its word and took full advantage of the situation, and the Bolsheviks' demand for a treaty "without annexations or indemnities" was unacceptable to the Central Powers, and on 18 February, hostilities resumed. The German Operation Faustschlag was of immediate success, and within 11 days, they were able to make a serious advance eastward, taking over Ukraine, the Baltic region, and occupying eastern Belarus. This forced the Obliskomzap to evacuate to Smolensk. The Smolensk Governorate was passed to the Western Oblast. At the end of February, the Germans entered Minsk, which the Soviet authorities had already cleared a few days prior.

Faced with the German demands, the Bolsheviks accepted their terms at the final Treaty of Brest-Litovsk, which was signed on 3 March 1918. For the German Empire, Operation Faustschlag achieved one of their strategic plans for World War I, to create a German-centered hegemony of buffer states, called Mitteleuropa. On the eve of Germany's occupation of Minsk, some members of the disbanded Belarusian National Council emerged from hiding and formed a provisional government, hoping to achieve German recognition. However, the Germans did not recognise it as another assembly in Vilna was created under their auspices. The Minsk and Vilna organisations issued a joint proclamation on 25 March establishing the Belarusian Democratic Republic (BDR) with German approval. The new government also sought material aid from Germany. The more radical nationalists who disapproved of collaboration with the Germans went to the communists and fled to Russia. The communists who did not escape to the east during the German occupation were driven underground.

In the spring of 1918, the Germans disapproved of the socialist inclinations of the nationalists in the Belarusian government and forced a change in leadership of the puppet government; however, the Germans were also displeased with him and removed him. As a result, the Germans permitted the government less jurisdiction compared to the one in Ukraine. An increase in repression by the Germans also led to an agrarian revolt, although not as violent as the one in Ukraine, which benefitted the communists. The communist underground was directed by the party's Northwestern Regional Committee in Smolensk, which aimed for an alliance with the peasantry.

=== Creation ===
The initial and provisional borders of the SSRB (dark green)

On 11 September 1918, the Revolutionary Military Council ordered the creation of the Western Defence region in the Western Oblast out of Curtain forces which were stationed there. Simultaneously the Council reorganised the Western Oblast as a Western Commune. After Germany was defeated in the First World War, it announced its evacuation from the occupied territories. The Germans began to depart in November 1918; however, there was no nationalist organisation in Belarus that was capable of assuming political authority, unlike in Ukraine. On 13 November, Moscow annulled the Treaty of Brest-Litovsk. Two days later, it transformed the Defence region into a Western army. It began an initial advance westward on 17 November. The Belarusian National Republic barely resisted, evacuating Minsk on 3 December. The Soviets maintained a distance of about 10–15 kilometres (6.2–9.3 mi) between the two armies, and took Minsk on 10 December. As the Red Army re-occupied Belarus, the soviets in the country were dominated by Russian and Jewish parties sympathetic to the communists.

Encouraged by their success, in Smolensk on 30–31 December 1918, the Sixth Western Oblast Party conference met and announced its split from the Russian Communist Party, proclaiming itself as the first congress of the Communist Party of Byelorussia (KP(b)B). The next day, the Soviet Socialist Republic of Byelorussia was proclaimed in Smolensk, terminating the Western Commune, and on 7 January, it was moved to Minsk. Aleksandr Myasnikyan emerged as head of the All-Byelorussian Central Executive Committee and Zmicier Zhylunovich as head of the provisional government.

The new Soviet republic initially consisted of seven districts: Baranovichi, Vitebsk, Gomel, Grodno, Mogilev and Smolensk. On 30 January, the republic announced its separation from the Russian SFSR and renaming as the Soviet Socialist Republic of Byelorussia (SSRB). This was conferred by the First Congress of deputies, composed of workers, soldiers and Red Army soldiers, which met on 2–3 February 1919, to adopt a new socialist constitution. The Red Army continued its westward advance, capturing the city of Grodno on New Year's Day 1919, Pinsk on 21 January, and Baranovichi on 6 February 1919, thereby enlarging the SSRB.

=== Litbel ===
Planned border (blue line) for the Lithuanian–Byelorussian Soviet Socialist Republic superimposed on state borders in 1922

The western winter offensive was not limited to Byelorussia; Soviet forces similarly moved to the north into Lithuania, as the newly created Soviet republic had hoped to include Lithuania. On 16 December, the Lithuanian Socialist Soviet Republic (LSSR) was proclaimed in Vilnius.

The Lithuanian operation and continuing conquest of Byelorussia were threatened by the rise of the Second Polish Republic after the withdrawal of German forces. However, the conflict with Poland did not break out and the Soviet High Command's 12 January directive was to cease advance on the Neman-Bug rivers. However, the region to the east of those lines was historically mixed among a population of Belarusians, Poles and Lithuanians, with a sizeable Jewish minority. The local communities of each respective group wanted to be part of the respective states that were establishing themselves.

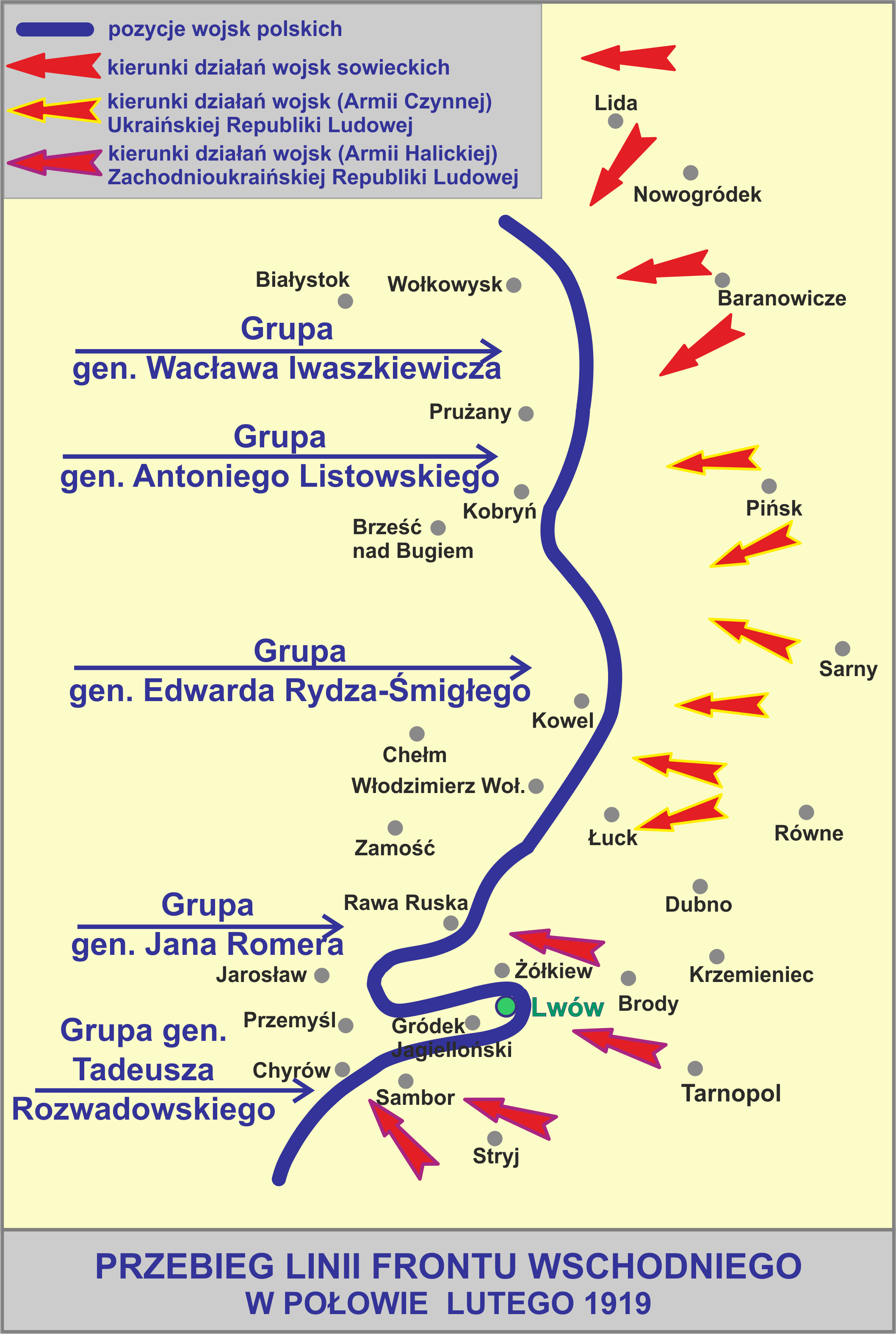
After their 1918–1919 winter conquest of Byelorussia, Ukraine and Lithuania, Soviet forces faced Poland as a competing power in the region.

In the Kresy ("borderland") areas of Lithuania, Belarus and western Ukraine, self-organized militias, the Samoobrona Litwy i Białorusi numbering approximately 2,000 soldiers under General Wejtko, began to fight against the local communist and advancing Bolshevik forces. Each side was trying to secure the territories for its own government. The newly formed Polish Army began sending its organised units to reinforce the militias. On 14 February, the first clash between regular armies took place and a front emerged. The operations in Lithuania brought the front close to East Prussia, and the German units that had withdrawn there began to assist the Lithuanian forces to defeat the Soviets; they repelled the Red offensive against Kaunas in February 1919.

Eager to win support, the Bolshevik government decided to merge the Lithuanian and Byelorussian republics into the Lithuanian–Belorussian Soviet Socialist Republic (Litbel) on 28 February 1919. Its capital was proclaimed as Vilna, with five governorates: Vilna, Grodno, Kovno, Suwalki and Minsk. The Vitebsk and Mogilev governorates were transferred to the Russian SFSR, and were soon joined by the Gomel Governorate, which was created on 26 April. The two parties of the republics were also combined. The republic was headed by Vincas Mickevičius-Kapsukas and the combined party was headed by nationalist Zmicier Zhylunovich. However, the Belarusian nationalists disapproved that the republic was being expanded, and Zhylunovich resigned shortly after, followed by other nationalists.

In March 1919, Polish units opened an offensive: forces under General Stanisław Szeptycki captured the city of Slonim (2 March) and crossed the Neman, whilst Lithuanian advances forced the Soviets out of Panevėžys. A final Soviet counter-offensive retook Panevėžys and Grodno in early April, but the Western Army was too thinly spread to fight both the Polish and Lithuanian troops, and the German units assisting them. The Polish offensive quickly gained momentum, and Vilna offensive in April 1919, forced Litbel to evacuate the capital first to Dvinsk (28 April), then to Minsk (28 April), then to Bobruysk (19 May). As the Litbel lost territory, its powers were quickly stripped by Moscow. For example, on 1 June, Vtsik's decree put all of Litbel's armed forces under the command of the Red Army. On 17 July, the Defence Soviet was liquidated, and its function was passed to Minsk's Milrevcom. When on 8 August Polish forces captured Minsk, that same day the capital was evacuated to Smolensk. On 28 August, Lithuanian forces took Zarasai (the last Lithuanian town held by Litbel) and the same day Bobruysk fell to the Poles.

By late summer of 1919, the Polish advance was also exhausted. The defeat of the Red Army allowed the outbreak of another historic disagreement over territory between Poland and Lithuania; their competition to control the city of Vilna soon erupted into a military conflict, with Poland winning. Facing Denikin and Kolchak, Soviet Russia could not spare men for the western front. A stalemate with localised skirmishes developed between Poland and Lithuania.

The Polish Sejm had also declared that the territories of Belarus were an inalienable part of the Polish Commonwealth. As the Sejm was voting for annexation, Józef Piłsudski offered the Belarusians federal ties instead; however, the Polish occupation authorities disregarded the social radicalism of the masses and nationalist sentiments among parts of the Belarusian intelligentsia, with the Poles ordering for the lands confiscated by the communists to be returned to the landowners, and Polish being introduced as an official language.

=== Pawn on a chessboard ===
The stalemate and the occasional, though fruitless, negotiations gave Russia a much-needed pause to concentrate on other regions. During the latter half of 1919, the Red Army successfully defeated Denikin in the south, taking over the Don, North Caucasus and eastern Ukraine, and pushed Kolchak from the Volga, beyond the Ural mountains into Siberia. In the autumn of 1919, Nikolai Yudenich's advance on Petrograd was checked, whilst in the far north the Evgeny Miller's army was pushed into the Arctic. On the diplomatic front, on 11 September 1919, the People's Commissar of Foreign Affairs of Soviet Russia, Georgy Chicherin, sent a note to Lithuania with a proposal for a peace treaty. It was a de facto recognition of the Lithuanian state. Similar negotiations with Estonia and Latvia, gave way for a peace treaty with the former on 2 February 1920 and a cease-fire agreement with the latter a day earlier.

Lenin feared that a Polish offensive was incoming, and offered to accept the current frontline as a permanent border between Poland and Russia, which would include nearly all of Belarus going to Poland. However, Piłsudski had greater ambitions, and he also made an agreement with Symon Petliura in Ukraine to exchange Galicia in return for a promise to force out communists in right-bank Ukraine.

=== War continues ===
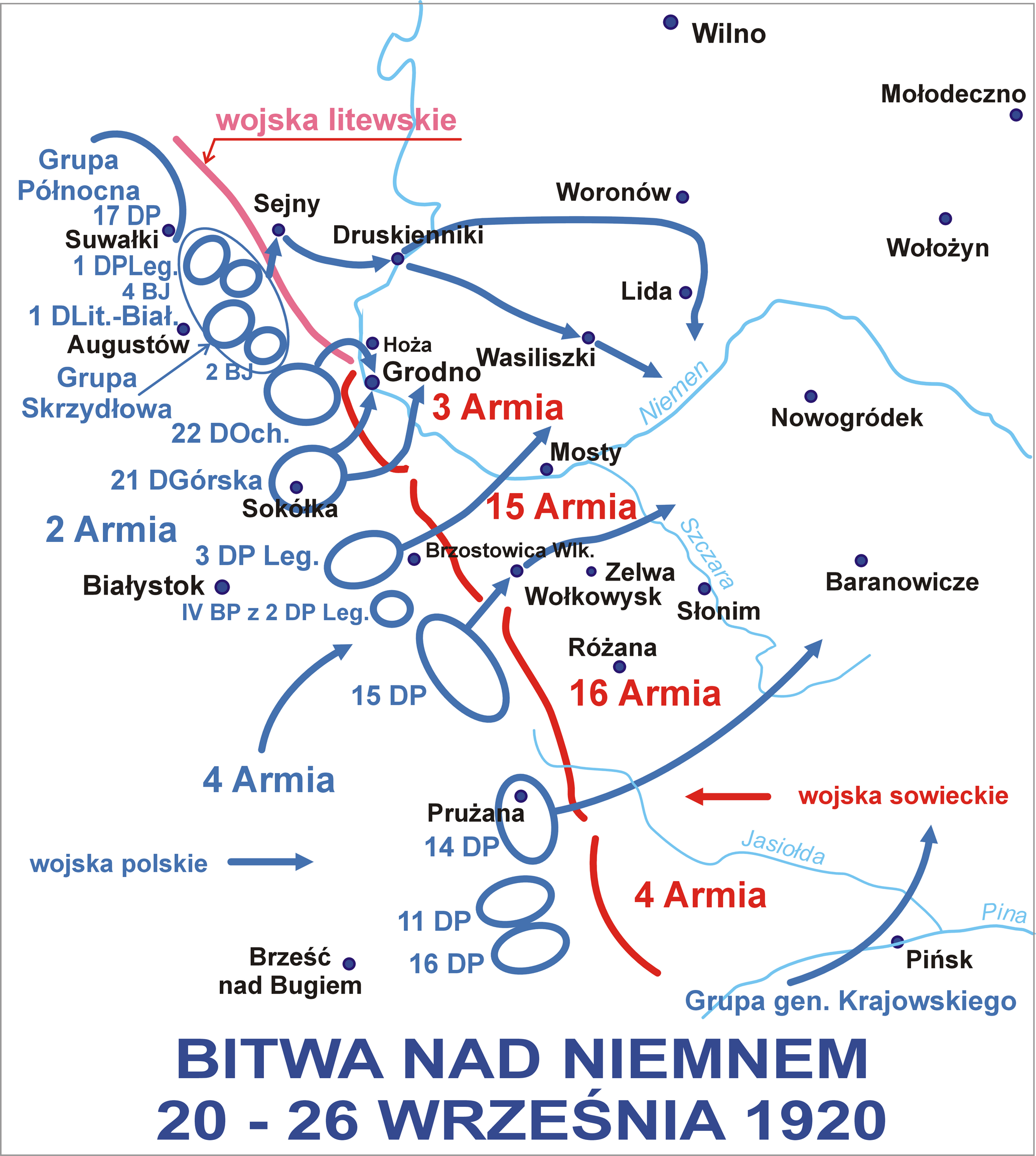
After the decisive Polish victory in Warsaw, the Red Army was forced to retreat from Polish territories, but attempts to hold Western Belarus were lost after the Polish victory on the Nieman River.

In April 1920, Poland initiated its major offensive on Kiev, which although was initially successful, ended in a Polish defeat. The Soviet Red Army was much more organised than it was a year earlier, and though Polish troops managed to make several gains in Ukraine, notably the capture of Kiev, in Byelorussia, both of its offensives towards Zhlobin and Orsha were thrown back in May.

In June, the RSFSR was finally ready to open its major Western advance. To preserve the neutrality of Lithuania (though the peace treaty was still being negotiated), on 6 June the exiled government of Litbel was disbanded. Within a few days, the 3rd Cavalry Corps under command of Hayk Bzhishkyan broke the Polish front, causing a collapse and a retreat. On 11 July Minsk was re-taken, and on 31 July 1920 once again the Soviet Socialist Republic of Belorussia was re-established in Minsk.

As the front moved west, and more Belarusian lands were adjoined to the new republic, the first administrative decrees were issued. The entity was divided into seven uyezds: Bobruysk, Borisov, Igumen, Minsk, Mozyr and Slutsk. (Vitebsk, Gomel and Mogilev remained part of the RSFSR.) This time the leaders were Aleksandr Chervyakov (head of Minsk's milrevcom) and Wilhelm Knorin (as chairmen of the Central Committee of the Belarusian Communist Party). The SSRB sought to join further territories, as the Red Army crossed into Poland, but the decisive Polish victory at the Battle of Warsaw in August ended these ambitions. Once again, the Red Army found itself on the defensive in Belorussia. The Poles were able to successfully break the Russian lines at the Battle of the Niemen River in September 1920. As a result, the Soviets were not only forced to abandon their World Revolution targets, but Western Belarus too. However, early autumn rains halted the Polish advance, which exhausted itself by October. A cease-fire agreed on 12 October, came into effect on 18 October.

=== Slutsk uprising ===
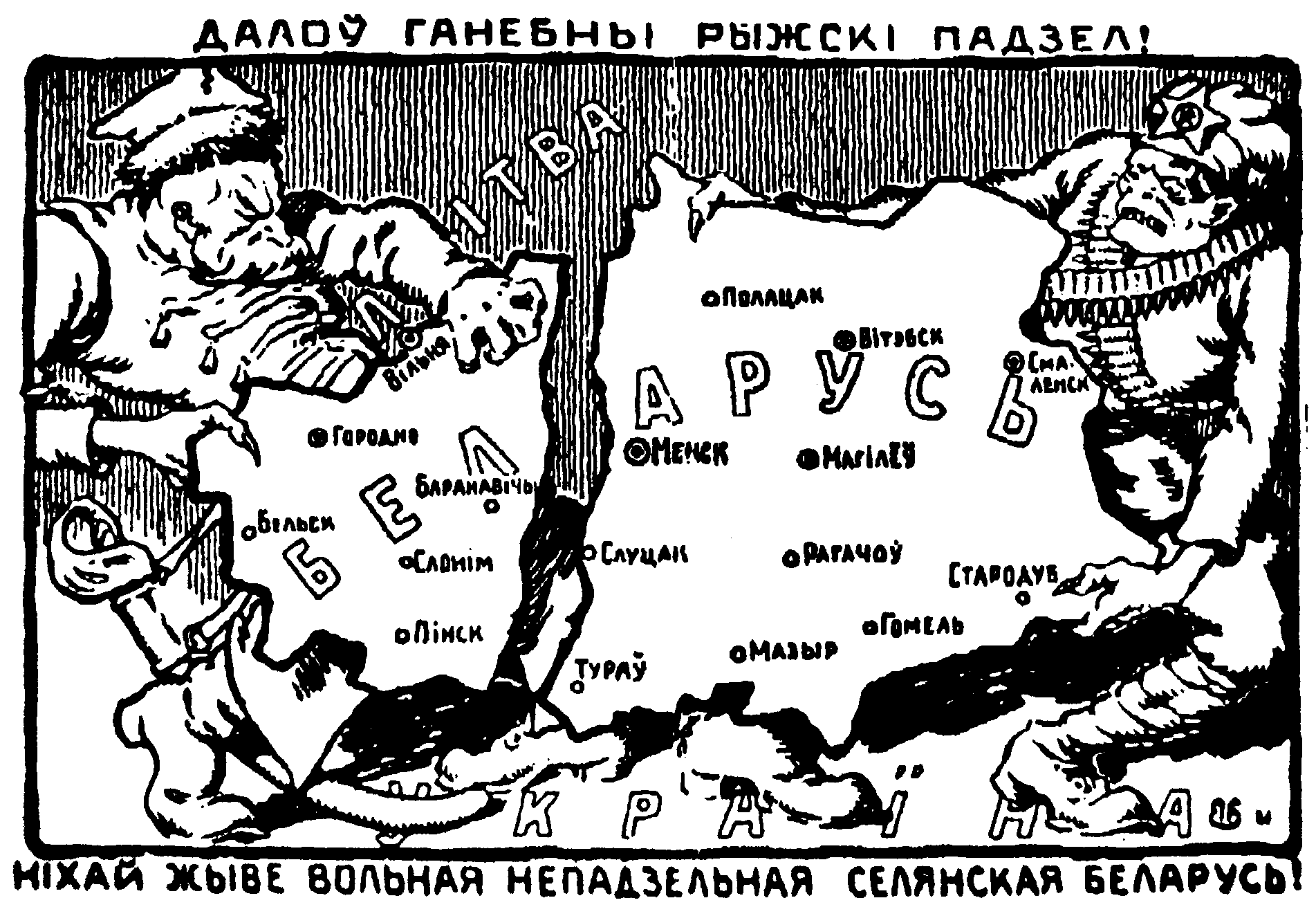
A Belarusian caricature showing the division of their country by Poles and Bolsheviks.

As the negotiations between the Polish Republic and the Russian Bolshevik government took place in Riga, the Soviet side saw the armistice as only a temporary setback in its western advance. Seeing the failure of overcoming the Polish nationalist rhetoric with Communist propaganda, the Soviet government chose a different tactic, by appealing to the minorities of the Polish state, creating a fifth column element out of Belarusians and Ukrainians. During the negotiations, RSFSR offered all of BSSR to Poland in return for concessions in Ukraine, which were rejected by the Polish side. Eventually a compromising armistice line was agreed, which would see the Belarusian city of Slutsk handed over to the Bolsheviks.

News of Belarus' upcoming permanent division angered the population, and using the town's Polish occupation, the local population began self-organising into a militia and associating itself with the Belarusian Democratic Republic. On 24 November the Polish units left the town, and for nearly a month the Slutsk partisans resisted Soviet attempts to regain control of the area. Eventually the Red Army had to mobilise two divisions to overcome the resistance, when the last units of Slutsk militia crossed the Moroch River and interned by the Polish border guards.

=== Early Soviet years ===
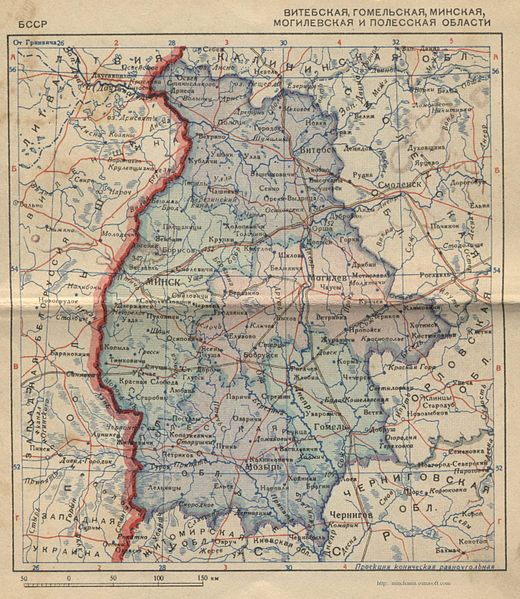
BSSR between the two World Wars

In February 1921, the delegations of the Second Polish Republic and the Russian SFSR finally signed the Treaty of Riga putting an end to hostilities in Europe and Belarus in particular. Six years of war had left the land neglected and looted, and the endless change of occupying regimes, each worse than the previous, left their mark on the Belarusian people, who were now divided. Almost half (Western Belarus) now belonged to Poland. Eastern Belarus (Gomel, Vitebsk and parts of Smolensk guberniyas) were administered by the RSFSR. The rest was the SSRB, a republic with 52,400 square kilometres and a population of a mere 1.544 million people.

An interesting paradox arose in the status of SSRB within the future Bolshevik state. On one hand its small geographic, population and almost negligent economic indicators did not warrant it much political weight on Soviet affairs. In fact the leader of the Communist Party of Byelorussia (Bolshevik), Alexander Chervyakov would represent Byelorussian communists at seven party congresses in Moscow, but not once be elected into the party's Central Committee. Moreover, the weak national sentiment of the Belarusian people would easily have allowed SSRB to be disbanded and annexed to the RSFSR, unlike for example Ukraine.

On the other hand, the region's strategic role decided its fate, as a full Union republic within the negotiations upon forming the future state. For one, Leon Trotsky and his supporters within the Soviet leadership still supported its World Revolution concept, and as said above, viewed the Treaty of Riga as only a temporary setback to the process, and a future advance would require a prepared bridgehead. This justified giving the SSRB the status of a full union republic within the Treaty on the Creation of the USSR that was signed on 30 December 1922. SSR Byelorussia became a founding member of the Soviet Union in 1922 and became known as BSSR. (Note: In Soviet historiography the term "SSRB" was suppressed, but there is documentary evidence of the usage of the term SSRB rather than BSSR, see, e.g., A 1992 cancellation of a 1921 SSRB laws)

However the politics in Moscow took a different course of events, and eventually the accession of Joseph Stalin saw a new policy adopted: Socialism in One Country. In accordance with which, expansionist and irredentist claims were removed from Soviet ideology, which instead would focus on making regions economically viable. Thus in March 1924, by decree of the All-Russian Central Executive Committee, Russia returned most of territories that made up the Vitebsk and Mogilev Governorates, as well as parts of Smolensk. The passing of land that largely survived the destruction of war not only doubled the SSRB's area to 110,600 square kilometres, but also raised the population to 4.2 million people.

=== SSRB in the mid-1920s ===
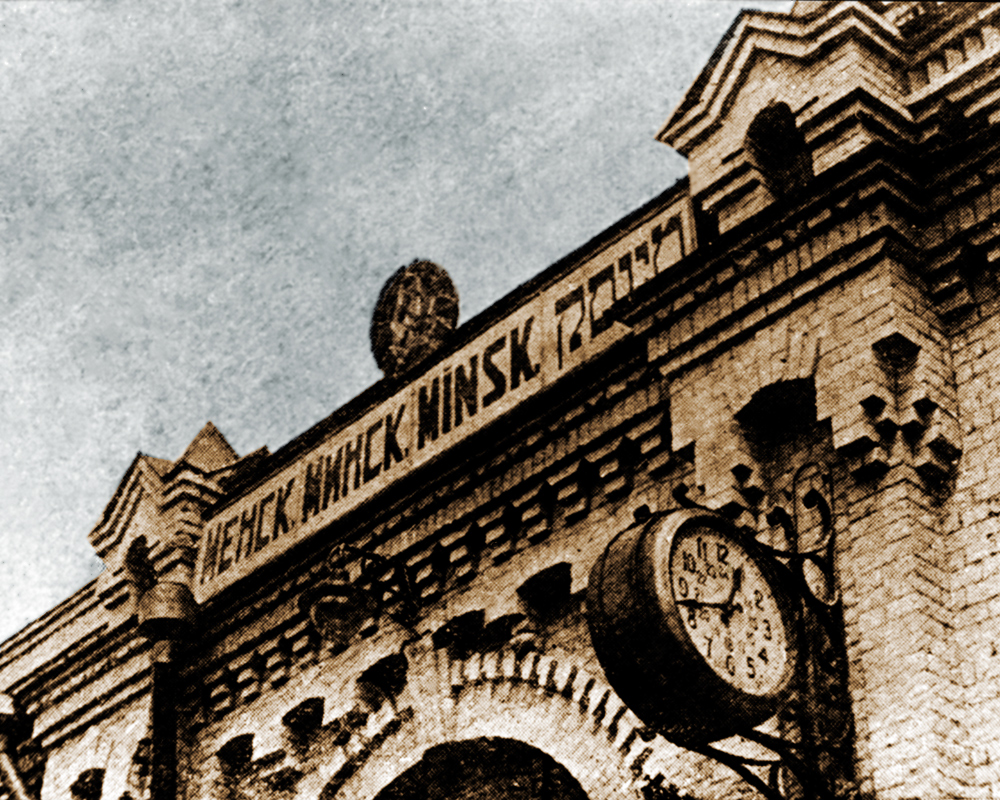
Minsk Railway Station (1926), with the city's name given in Belarusian, Russian, Polish and Yiddish (or interwar Belarus's 4 official languages)

According to its entry in the Great Soviet Encyclopedia, in 1925 SSRB was a largely rural country. Out of the 4,342,800 people that inhabited it, only 14.5% lived in urban areas. Administratively it was split into ten okrugs: Bobruysk, Borisov, Vitebsk, Kalinin, Minsk, Mogilev, Mozyr, Orsha, Polotsk and Slutsk; all of which contained a total of 100 raions and 1,229 selsoviets. Only 25 towns and cities and an additional 49 urban settlements.

Trotsky's plan for the SSRB to act as a future magnet for the minorities in the Second Polish Republic is clearly evidenced in the national policies. The republic initially had four official languages: Belarusian, Russian, Yiddish, and Polish, despite the fact that the Russians and the Poles made up only around 2% of the total population (most of the latter lived next to the state border in the Minsk and Borisov districts). The most important minority was the Jewish population of Belarus, which had a long history of targeted oppression under the Tsars, and in 1925 made up almost 44% of the urban population and began to be aided by affirmative action programmes. In 1924 the government created a committee – Belkomzet – to allocate land to Jewish families, in 1926 a total of 32,700 hectares were given for 6,860 Jewish families. Jews would continue to play a major role in Byelorussian politics, society and economy right up to the Second World War; in fact, between 1928 and 1930, the first secretary of the Communist Party of Byelorussia, Yakov Gamarnik, was a Jew.

Yet, the titular nation of the SSRB were the Belarusians, which made up 82% of the rural population, but less than half of the urban one (40.1%). The Belarusian national sentiment was a lot weaker than that of neighbouring Ukraine, this was greatly exploited by the Bolshevik-Polish power struggle in the Polish–Soviet War. (In fact to avoid being annexed to Poland, at the census of 1920, many chose to be label themselves as Russians.). To appeal to the Belarusians of Western Belarus and also to prevent the nationalist element of the exiled Belarusian Democratic Republic from having any influence on the population (i.e. to avoid another Slutsk uprising), a policy of Korenizatsiya was widely implemented. Belarusian language, folklore and culture was put at front of everything else. This went on par with the Soviet policy of liquidation of illiteracy (likbez).

Economically the republic remained largely self-centred, and most of the effort was put into restoring and repairing the war-damaged industry (if in 1923 there was only 226 different fabrics and factories, then by 1926 the number climbed to 246. However, the employed manpower jumped from 14 thousand to 21.3 thousand workers). The majority was food industry followed by metal and wood working combines. A lot more was centred in local and private sector, as allowed by the New Economic Policy of the USSR, in 1925 these number 38.5 thousand who employed almost 50 thousand people. Most being textile workshops and lumber yards and blacksmiths.

On 6 December 1926, the SSRB was once again enlarged, in order to make the republic prosperous and continue the creating of well-defined national territorial units. This time, parts of RSFSR's Gomel Governorate were added, including the cities of Gomel and Rechytsa. This increased the area to 126,300 square kilometres and the 1926 Soviet census that was held at the same time reported a population of 4,982,623. Of the latter 83% was rural, and Belarusians made up 80.6% (though only 39.2% of urban, yet 89% of rural).

On 11 April 1927, the republic adopted its new Constitution, bringing its laws in tie with those of the USSR and changing the name from the Soviet Socialist Republic of Byelorussia to the Byelorussian Soviet Socialist Republic. The head of government (chairman of the Soviet of People's Commissars) was by now then newly appointed Nikolay Goloded, whilst Vilhelm Knorin remained the first secretary of the Communist Party.

=== Stalinist years ===
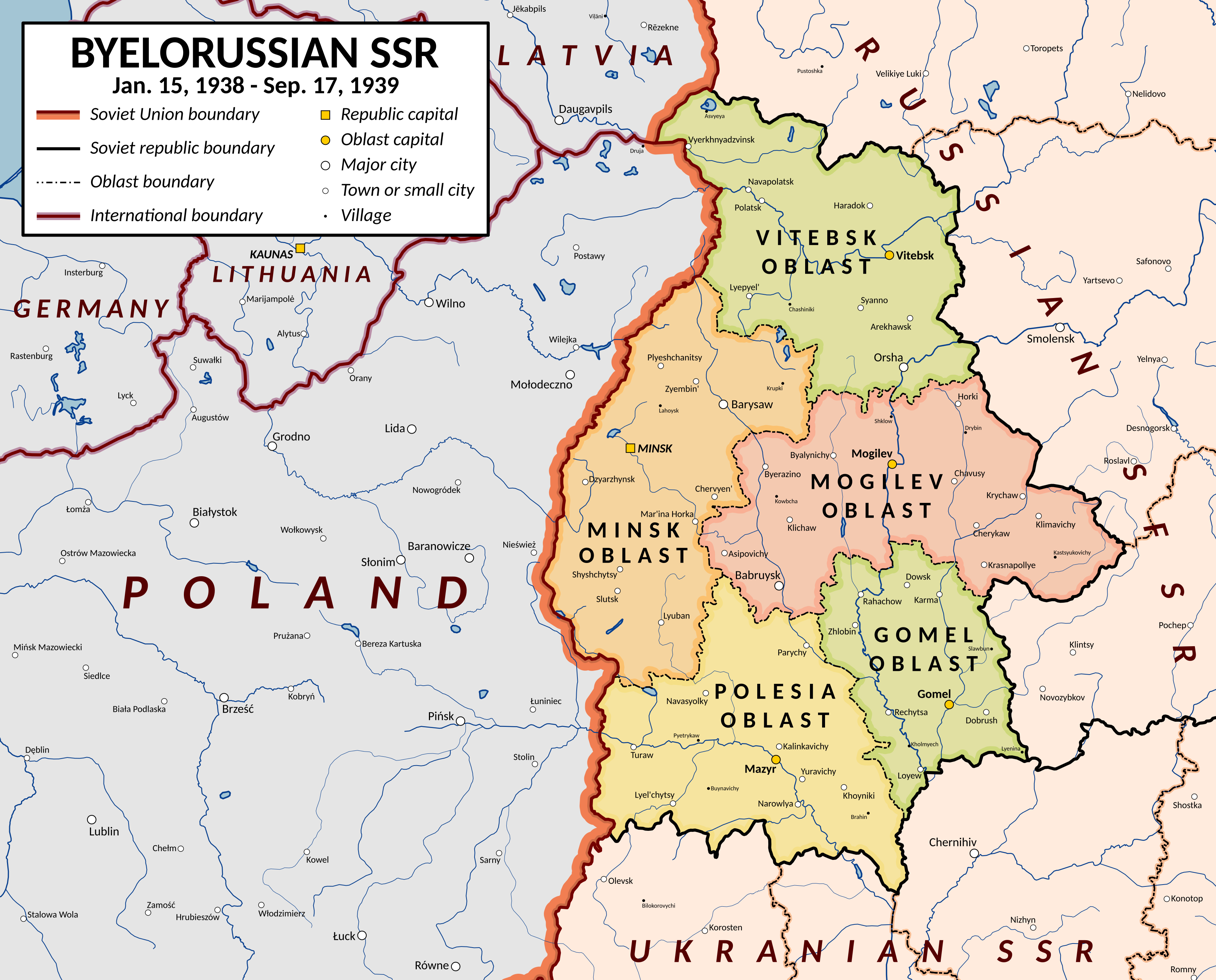
The Byelorussian SSR prior to the invasion of Poland

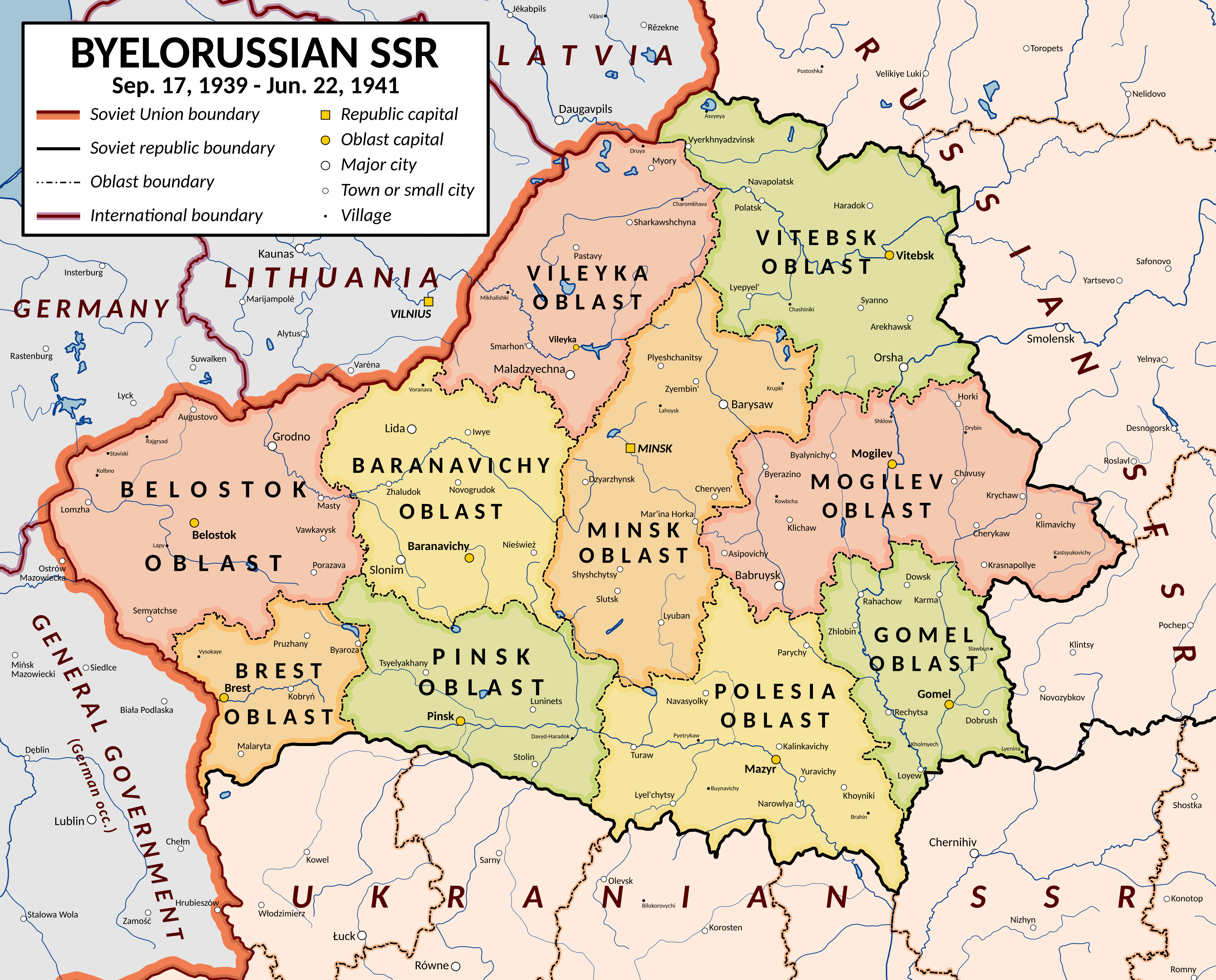
The Byelorussian SSR after the invasion of Poland

The 1930s marked the peak of Soviet repressions in Belarus. According to incomplete calculations, about 600,000 people fell victim to Soviet repressions in Belarus between 1917 and 1953. Other estimates put the number at higher than 1.4 million persons, of which 250,000 were sentenced by judicial or executed by extrajudicial bodies (dvoikas, troikas, special commissions of the OGPU, NKVD, MGB). Excluding those sentenced in the 1920s–1930s, over 250,000 Belarusians were deported as kulaks or kulak family members to regions outside the Belarusian Soviet Republic. The scale of Soviet terror in Belarus was higher than in Russia or Ukraine, which resulted in a much stronger extent of Russification in the republic.

A Polish Autonomous District was founded in 1932 and disbanded in 1935.

In September 1939, the Soviet Union, following the Molotov–Ribbentrop Pact with Nazi Germany, occupied eastern Poland after the 1939 invasion of Poland. The former Polish territories referred to as West Belarus were incorporated into the Belarusian SSR, with an exception of the city of Vilnius and its surroundings that were transferred to Lithuania. The annexation was internationally recognized after the end of World War II.

=== Nazi German occupation ===
In the summer of 1941, Belarus was occupied by Nazi Germany. A large part of the territory of Belarus became the General District Belarus within the Reichskommissariat Ostland.

Nazi Germany imposed a brutal regime, deporting some 380,000 people for slave labour and killing hundreds of thousands of civilians more. 800,000 Belarusian Jews (about 90 percent of the Jewish population) were killed during the Holocaust. At least 5,295 Belarusian settlements were destroyed by the Germans and some or all their inhabitants killed (out of 9,200 settlements that were burned or otherwise destroyed in Belarus during World War II). More than 600 villages like Khatyn were totally annihilated. Altogether, over 2,000,000 people were killed in Belarus during the three years of German occupation, almost a quarter of the region's population.

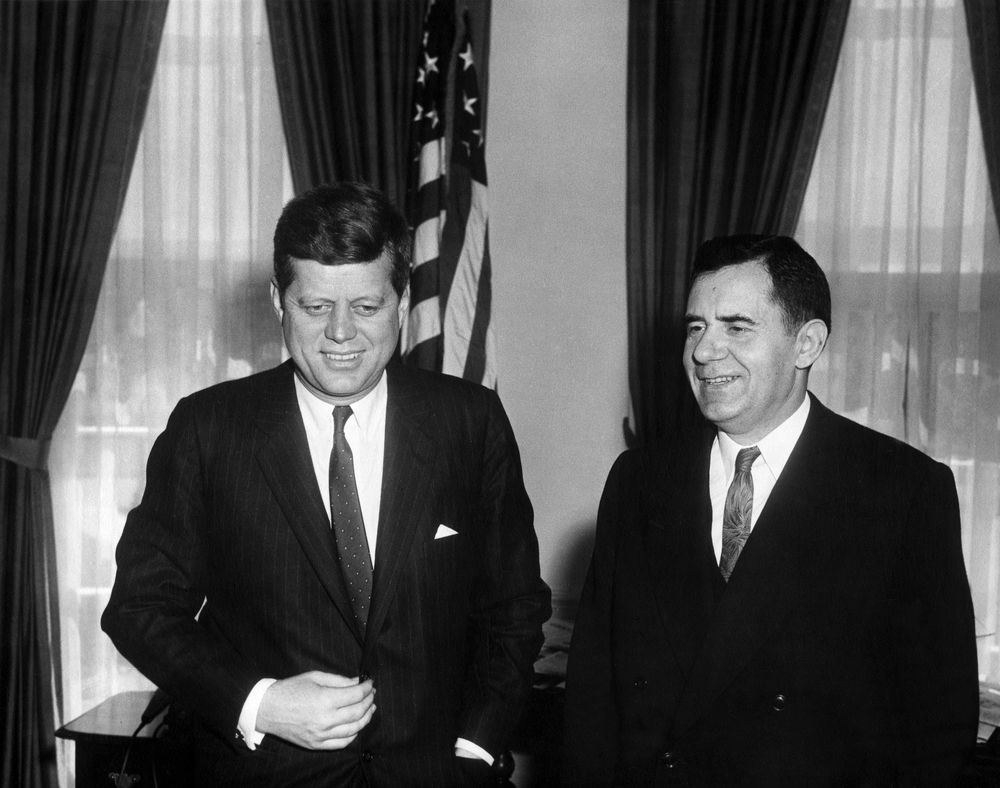
Belarus-born Andrei Gromyko (right) served as Soviet foreign minister (1957–1985) and as Chairman of the Presidium of the Supreme Soviet (1985–1988)

After World War II, the Byelorussian SSR was given a seat in the United Nations General Assembly together with the Soviet Union and Ukrainian SSR, becoming one of the founding members of the UN. This was part of a deal with the United States to ensure a degree of balance in the General Assembly, which, the USSR opined, was unbalanced in favor of the Western Bloc. A Byelorussian, G.G. Chernushchenko, served as President of the United Nations Security Council from January–February 1975.

=== Dissolution ===
In its last years during perestroika under Mikhail Gorbachev, the Supreme Soviet of Byelorussian SSR declared sovereignty on 27 July 1990 over Soviet laws.

On 25 August 1991, after the failure of the coup in Moscow, the republic proclaimed its political and economic independence from the Soviet Union, however, continued to consider herself part of the USSR. On 19 September the republic was renamed the Republic of Belarus. On 8 December 1991, it was a signatory, along with Russia and Ukraine, of the Belovezha Accords, which replaced the Soviet Union with the Commonwealth of Independent States. Belarus received independence on 25 December 1991. A day later the Soviet Union ceased to exist. However, the Constitution (Fundamental Law) of the Republic of Belarus of 1978, was retained after independence.

== Politics and government ==
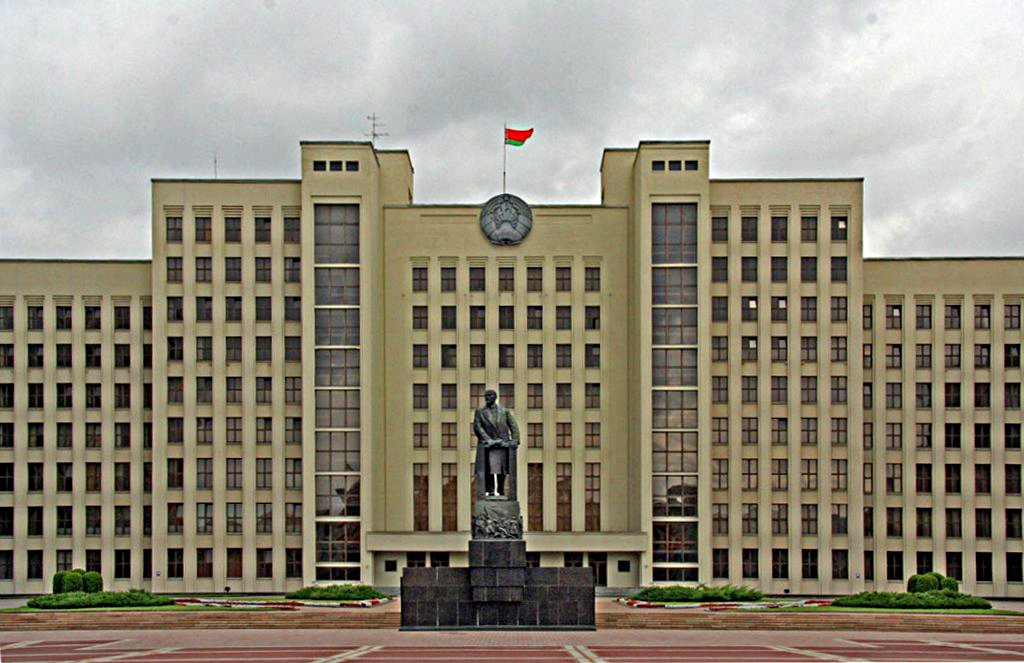
The Supreme Soviet of Byelorussia met for its legislative sessions in Minsk.

Until 1990, Byelorussia was a one-party socialist republic, governed by the Communist Party of Byelorussia, a branch within the Communist Party of the Soviet Union (CPSU/KPSS). Like all other Soviet republics, it was one of the 15 constituent republics composing the Soviet Union from its entry into the union in 1922 until its dissolution in 1991. Executive power was exercised by the Byelorussian Communist Party authorities, at its top sits the Chairman of the Council of Ministers. Legislative power was vested in the unicameral parliament, the Supreme Soviet of the Byelorussian SSR, also dominated by the Communist Party.

Belarus is the legal successor of the Byelorussian SSR and in its Constitution it states, "Laws, decrees and other acts which were applied in the territory of the Republic of Belarus prior to the entry into force of the present Constitution shall apply in the particular parts thereof that are not contrary to the Constitution of the Republic of Belarus."

=== Foreign relations ===
On the international stage, Byelorussia (along with Ukraine) was one of only two republics of the Soviet Union to be separate members of the United Nations. Both republics and the Soviet Union joined the UN when the organization was founded with the other 50 states on 24 October 1945. In effect, this provided the Soviet Union (a permanent Security Council member with veto powers) with another 2 votes in the General Assembly.

Apart from the UN, the Byelorussian SSR was a member of the UN Economic and Social Council, UNICEF, International Labour Organization, Universal Postal Union, World Health Organization, UNESCO, International Telecommunication Union, United Nations Economic Commission for Europe, World Intellectual Property Organization and the International Atomic Energy Agency. Byelorussia was excluded separately from the Warsaw Pact, Comecon, the World Federation of Trade Unions and the World Federation of Democratic Youth. In 1949, it joined the International Olympic Committee as a Union Republic.

== Demographics ==
According to the 1959 Soviet Census, the population of the republic were made up as follows:

Ethnicities (1959):

- Belarusians – 81%
- Poles – 16%
- Lithuanians – 5%
- Ukrainians – about 1%
- Jews – about 1%
- Russians – <1%

The largest cities were:

- Minsk
- Brest
- Gomel
- Grodno
- Mogilev
- Vitebsk
- Bobruisk

== Culture ==
=== Cuisine ===
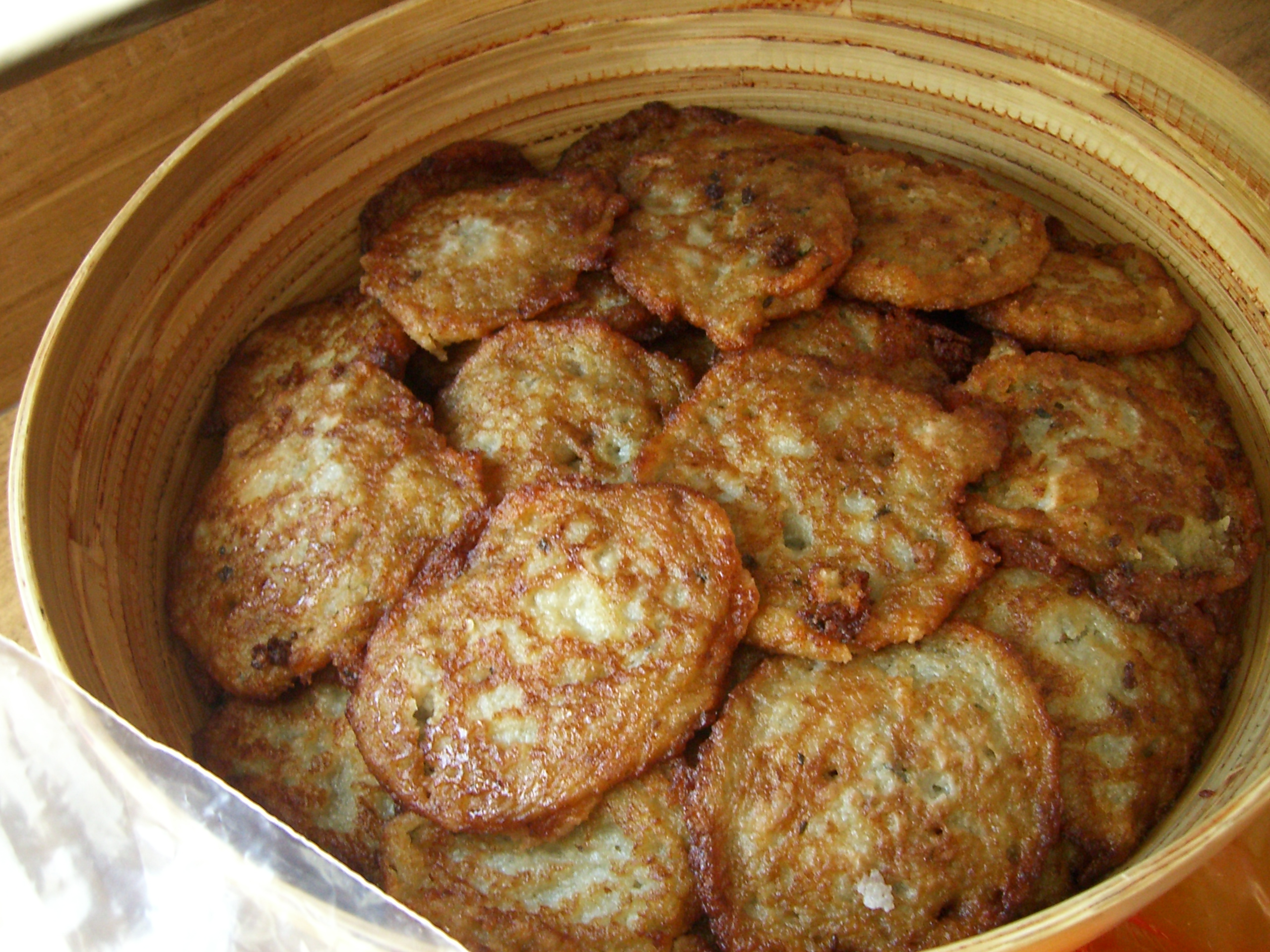
Draniki, the national dish

Whilst part of the Union, the cuisine of Byelorussia consisted mainly of vegetables, meat (particularly pork), and bread. Foods are usually either slowly cooked or stewed. Typically, Byelorussians eat a light breakfast and two hearty meals, with dinner being the largest meal of the day. Wheat and rye breads are consumed in Belarus, but rye is more plentiful because conditions are too harsh for growing wheat. Many of the cuisines within Byelorussia also shared its cuisine with Russia and Poland.

== See also ==
- List of states and regions involved in the Russian Civil War
- Bibliography of the Russian Revolution and Civil War
- Bibliography of the history of Belarus and Byelorussia
- Outline of the Russian Revolution and Civil War
- Captive Nations
- Belarusization
- Russification of Belarus

== Bibliography ==
- Pipes, Richard (25 April 1997). The Formation of the Soviet Union: Communism and Nationalism, 1917–1923, Revised Edition. Harvard University Press. ISBN 978-0-674-41764-9.
