= Government of the Soviet Union =

Highest executive and administrative organ in the Soviet Union

The Government of the Union of Soviet Socialist Republics (USSR) was the executive and administrative organ of the highest body of state authority, the All-Union Supreme Soviet. It was formed on 30 December 1922 and abolished on 26 December 1991. The government was headed by a chairman, most commonly referred to as the premier of the Soviet Union, and several deputy chairmen throughout its existence. The Communist Party of the Soviet Union (CPSU), as "The leading and guiding force of Soviet society and the nucleus of its political system" per Article 6 of the state constitution, controlled the government by holding a two-thirds majority in the All-Union Supreme Soviet. The government underwent several name changes throughout its history, and was known as the Council of People's Commissars from 1922 to 1946, the Council of Ministers from 1946 to 1991, the Cabinet of Ministers from January to August 1991 and the Committee on the Operational Management of the National Economy from August to December 1991.

The government chairman was nominated by the Central Committee of the Communist Party of the Soviet Union (CPSU) and elected by delegates at the first plenary session of a newly elected Supreme Soviet of the Soviet Union. Certain governments, such as Ryzhkov's second government, had more than 100 government ministers, serving as first deputy premiers, deputy premiers, government ministers or heads of state committees/commissions; they were chosen by the premier and confirmed by the Supreme Soviet. The Government of the Soviet Union exercised its executive powers in conformity with the constitution of the Soviet Union and legislation enacted by the Supreme Soviet. The first government was led by Vladimir Lenin, and the last government was led by Valentin Pavlov.

Following the Treaty on the Creation of the USSR of 1922, the Russian SFSR, Ukrainian SSR, the Byelorussian SSR and the Transcaucasian SSR established the Union of Soviet Socialist Republics (USSR). The treaty established the government, which was later legitimised by the adoption of the first Soviet constitution in 1924. The 1924 constitution made the government responsible to the Congress of Soviets of the Soviet Union. In 1936, the state system was reformed with the enactment of a new constitution. It abolished the Congress of Soviets and established the Supreme Soviet of the Soviet Union in its place. At the 1st Plenary Session of the II Supreme Soviet in 1946, the government was renamed Council of Ministers. Minor changes were introduced with the enactment of the 1977 constitution. The CPSU's 19th All-Union Conference voted in favor of amending the constitution. It allowed for multi-candidate elections, established the Congress of People's Deputies and weakened the party's control over the Supreme Soviet. Later, on 20 March 1991, the Supreme Soviet on Mikhail Gorbachev's suggestion amended the constitution to establish a semi-presidential system, essentially a fusion of the American and French styles of government. The Council of Ministers was abolished and replaced by a Cabinet of Ministers that was responsible to the president of the Soviet Union. The head of the Cabinet of Ministers was the prime minister of the Soviet Union. The government was forced to resign in the aftermath of the 1991 Soviet coup d'état attempt, which Prime Minister Valentin Pavlov participated in. In its place, the Soviet state established what was supposed to be a transitory committee headed by Silayev to run the basic governmental functions until a new cabinet was appointed. On 26 December 1991, the Supreme Soviet dissolved the union and therefore, the government of the USSR shut down permanently; but although remaining institutions permanently closed by 31 December, the structures of the system continued to exist until 12 December 1993 when the Constitution of Russia took effect abolishing the Soviet system of government.

== Etymology ==
The name Council of People's Commissars was chosen to distinguish the Soviet government from its bourgeois counterparts, especially its tsarist predecessor the Council of Ministers. However, scholar Derek Watson states that "the term 'commissar' was regarded as interchangeable with 'minister', and there seems little doubt that the Bolshevik leaders meant 'minister'." Joseph Stalin, in a speech to the II Supreme Soviet in March 1946, argued to change the name of government from Council of People's Commissars to Council of Ministers because "The commissar reflects the period of revolutionary rupture and so on. But that time has now passed. Our social system has come into being and is now made flesh and blood. It is time to move on from the title 'people's commissar' to that of 'minister.'" Scholar Yoram Gorlizki writes that "Notwithstanding the reversion to bourgeois precedents, the adoption of the new nomenclature signaled that the Soviet order had entered a new phase of postrevolutionary consolidation."

== History ==
=== Revolutionary beginnings and Molotov's chairmanship (1922–1941) ===
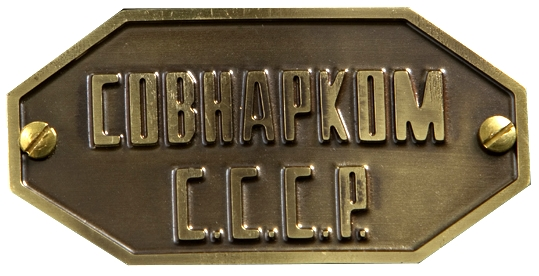
A governmental badge from 1930.

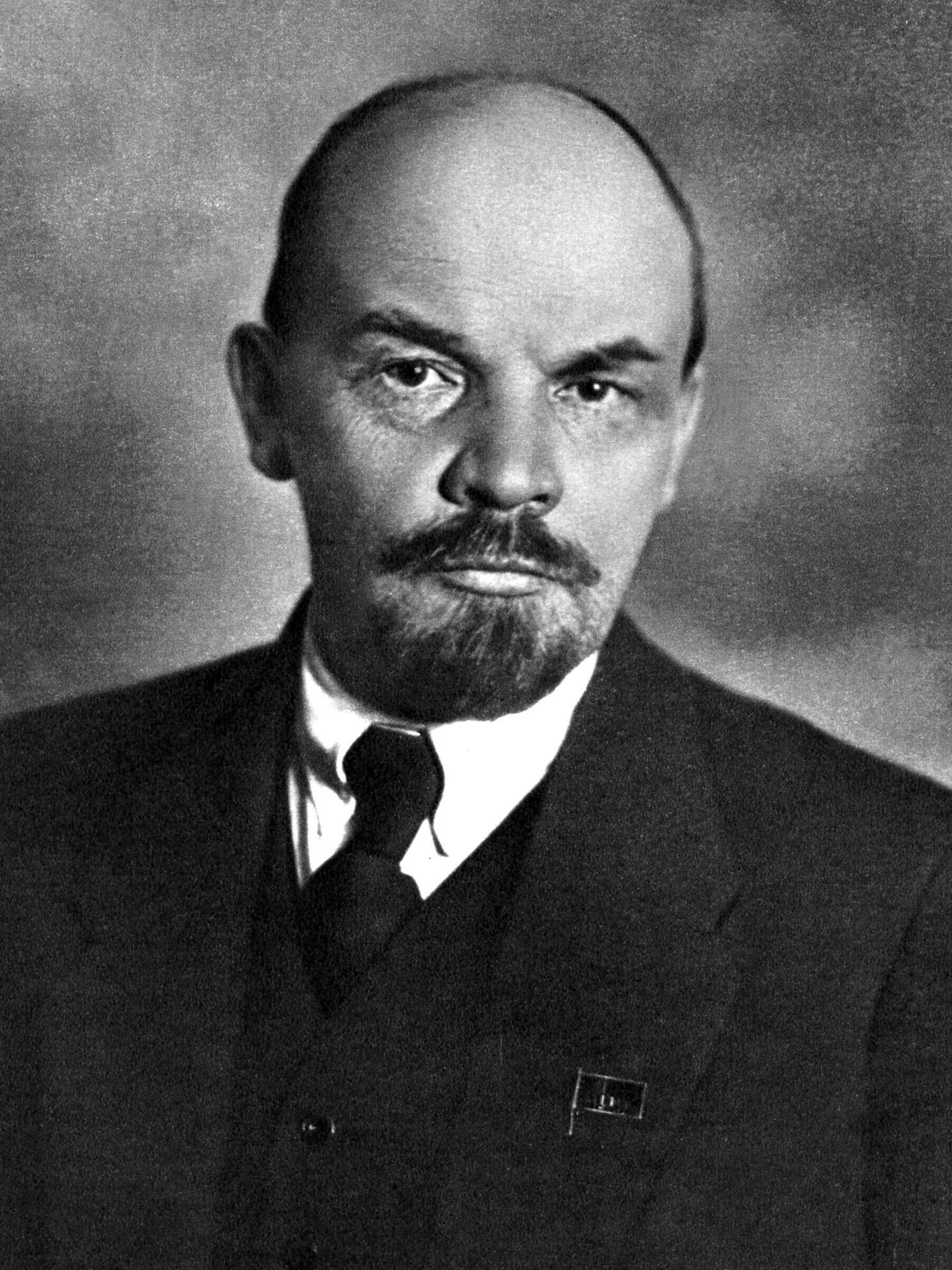
Lenin in 1920

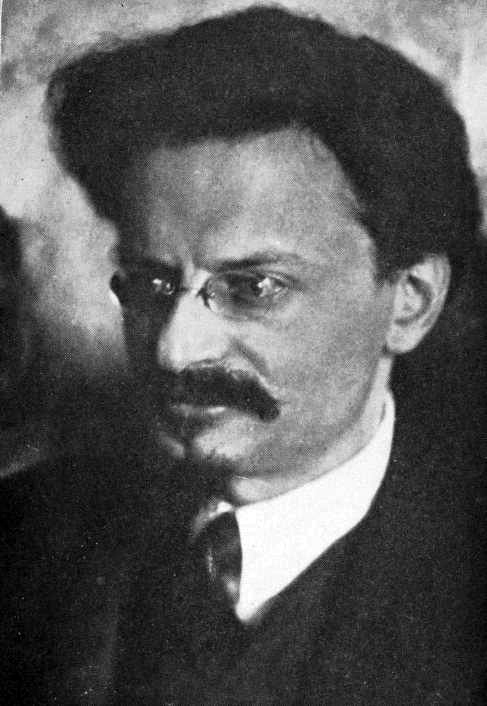
Lenin and Trotsky (both photographed in 1920) were viewed as the leading figures in the first Soviet government

The Treaty on the Creation of the Soviet Union saw the establishment of the All-Union Congress of Soviets and its Central Executive Committee (CEC). The Congress of Soviets held legislative responsibilities and was the supreme organ of state power, while the CEC was to exercise the powers of the Congress of Soviets whenever it was not in session, which in practice comprised the majority of its existence. It stated that the government, named the Council of People's Commissars, was to be the executive arm of the CEC. This governmental structure was copied from the one established in the Russian Socialist Federative Soviet Republic (Russian SFSR), and the government was modeled on the Council of People's Commissars of the Russian SFSR. The government of the Russian SFSR led by Vladimir Lenin governed the Soviet Union until 6 July 1923, when the CEC established the Council of People's Commissars of the Soviet Union. Lenin was appointed its chairman, alongside five deputy chairmen and ten people's commissars (ministers). On 17 July 1923 the All-Union Council of People's Commissars notified the central executive committees of the union republics and their respective republican governments that it had begun to fulfill the tasks entrusted to it.

The original idea was for the Council of People's Commissars to report directly (and be subordinate) to the CEC, but the working relations of the two bodies were never clearly defined in depth. Eventually, the powers of the Council of People's Commissars outstripped those of the CEC. However, the 1924 constitution defined the Council of People's Commissars as the "executive and administrative organ" of the CEC. The ability to legislate was restricted by the powers conferred to it by the CEC, and on the Statute of the Council of People's Commissars. The legislative dominance of the Council of People's Commissars continued despite the 1924 constitution's insistence on its relationship to the CEC. Mikhail Kalinin of the CEC and Chairman of the All-Russian Central Executive Committee noted in 1928 that one needed to differentiate between the Presidium of the CEC, which he considered the "organ of legislation", and the administrative role of the Council of People's Commissars.

The 1924 constitution differentiated between All-Union and unified (referred to as republican from 1936 onwards) people's commissariats. The people's commissariats for justice, internal affairs, social security, education, agriculture and public health remained republican-level ministries. In the meantime the commissariats for foreign affairs, commerce and industry, transport, military and navy affairs, finance, foreign trade, labour, post and telegraphs, supply and the interior were granted All-Union status. This system created troubles at first since neither the constitution or any legal document defined the relations between All-Union commissariats, their organs in republics and the separate unified republican commissariats. However, this system was kept with minor changes until the dissolution of the Soviet Union in 1991.

The 1936 constitution defined the Council of People's Commissars as the Soviet government, and conferring upon it the role of the "highest executive and administrative organ of state power". The constitution stripped the Council of People's Commissars of powers to initiate legislation, and instead confined it to issuing "decrees and regulations on the basis and in execution of the laws currently in force". Only the Supreme Soviet and its Presidium, having replaced the Congress of Soviets and the Central Executive Committee respectively, could alter laws.

=== High Stalinism (1941–1953) ===
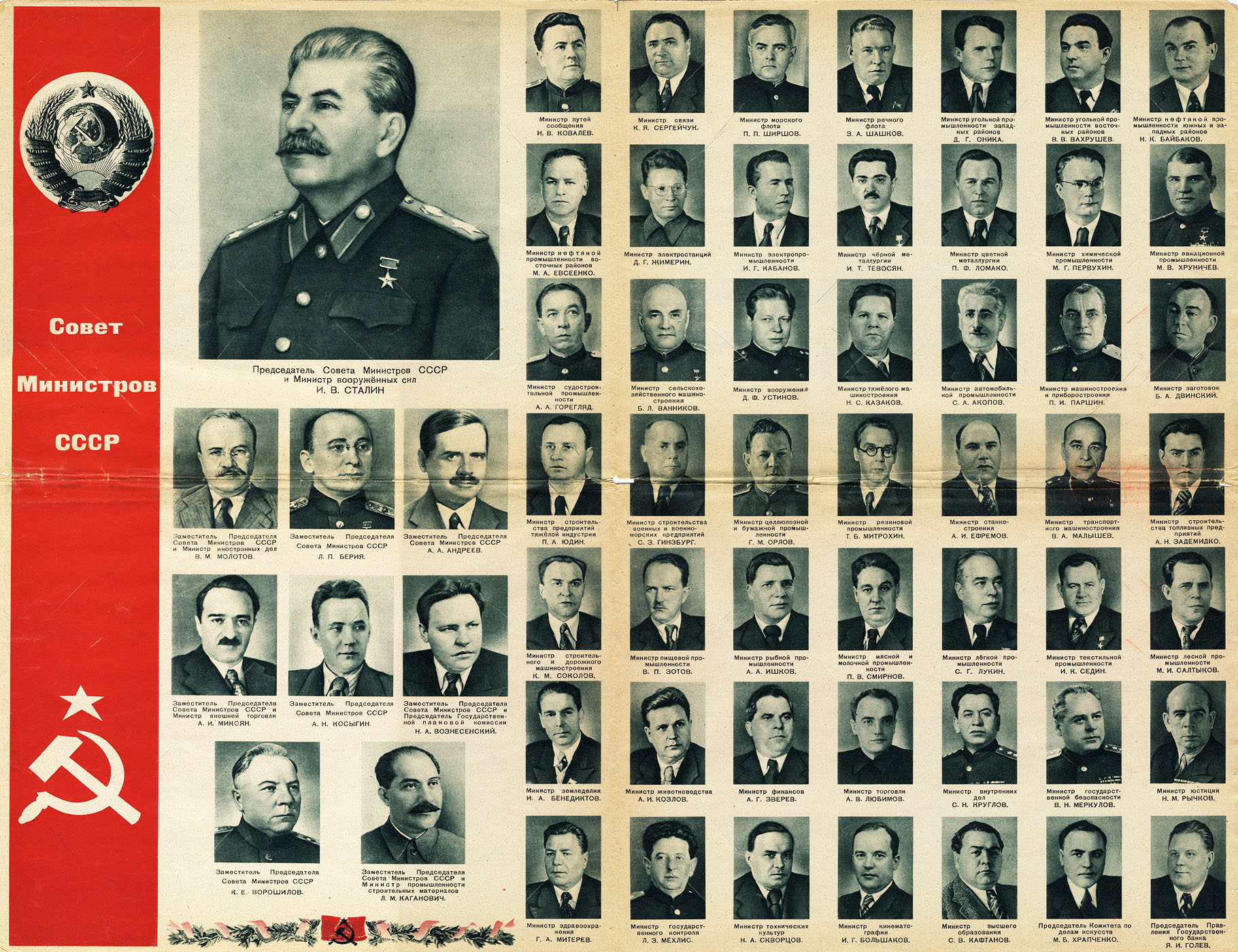
The composition of Stalin's Second Government as shown in 1946.

Stalin's power grab in the 1930s weakened the formal institutions of governance, both in the party and government. Scholar T. H. Rigby writes that "all institutions had gradually dissolved in the acid of despotism", and from 1946 until Stalin died in 1953 "only the most minimal of gestures were made to reverse the atrophy of formal organs of authority, in both party and state." British academic Leonard Schapiro contended that "Stalin's style of rule was characterised by how rule through regular machinery (party, government apparatus) gave way increasingly to the rule of personal agents and agencies, each operating separately and often in conflict, with Stalin in supreme overall control." The government, which was at this point the most formalised Soviet state institution, developed neopatrimonial features due to Stalin's habit of ruling through "the strict personal loyalty of his lieutenants".

Stalin was elected to the government chairmanship on 6 May 1941. The government continued to function normally until World War II (known as the Great Patriotic War in Russia) when it was subordinated to the State Defense Committee (SDC), formed on 30 June 1941 to govern the Soviet Union during the war. Joseph Stalin concurrently served as SDC head and as chairman of the Soviet government until 1946. On 15 March 1946 the 1st Plenary Session of the 2nd Supreme Soviet transformed the Council of People's Commissars into the Council of Ministers. Accordingly, the people's commissariats were renamed ministries, and the people's commissars into ministers. On 25 February 1947, appropriate changes were made to the Constitution of the Soviet Union.

The government's Bureau was established in 1944. After the war, the bureau was split into two. These bureaus were merged on 20 March 1946, reestablishing the government's Bureau. The party Politburo adopted on 8 February 1947 the resolution "On the Organization of the Council of Ministers", which sought to explain the role of the Council of Ministers, its internal operations, and its relationship with the party. It stated that the party politburo had the right to decide on all political matters, which included such topics as governmental appointments and defense, foreign policy, and internal security. It went on to define the government solely as an institution of administering the economy. The non-economic ministries, such as the Ministry of State Security, reported to the politburo.

In addition, the 8 February resolution established eight sectoral bureaus; Bureau for Agriculture, Bureau for Metallurgy and Chemicals, Bureau for Machine Construction, Bureau for Fuel and Electric Power Stations, Bureau for Food Industry, Bureau for Transport and Communication, Bureau for Light Industry and Bureau for Culture and Health. This decision transformed the government's working methods. The new resolution delegated authorities to the bureaus and away from the deputy chairmen of government and high-standing ministers. Every sectoral bureau was headed by a deputy chairman of the government, but decision-making was devolved into these collegial decision-making organs. The net effect of these changes was to greatly increase the legislative activity of the government.

Stalin, who had not attended a meeting of the Bureau since 1944, resorted to appointing acting government chairmen. Molotov was first appointed, but could rarely fulfill his duties since he was simultaneously Minister of Foreign Affairs and often away on business. On 29 March 1948 the politburo resolved to create a rotational chairmanship headed by Lavrentiy Beria, Nikolai Voznesensky and Georgy Malenkov. Lacking a formal leader, most controversial issues were solved at meetings of the Bureau. On 1 September 1949 power was even more dispersed. The Bureau changed its name to the Presidium of the Council of Ministers, and Beria, Malenkov, Nikolai Bulganin, Lazar Kaganovich and Maksim Saburov were handed the chairmanship. This mode of operating lasted until Stalin's death in 1953.

=== Post-Stalin Era (1953–1985) ===
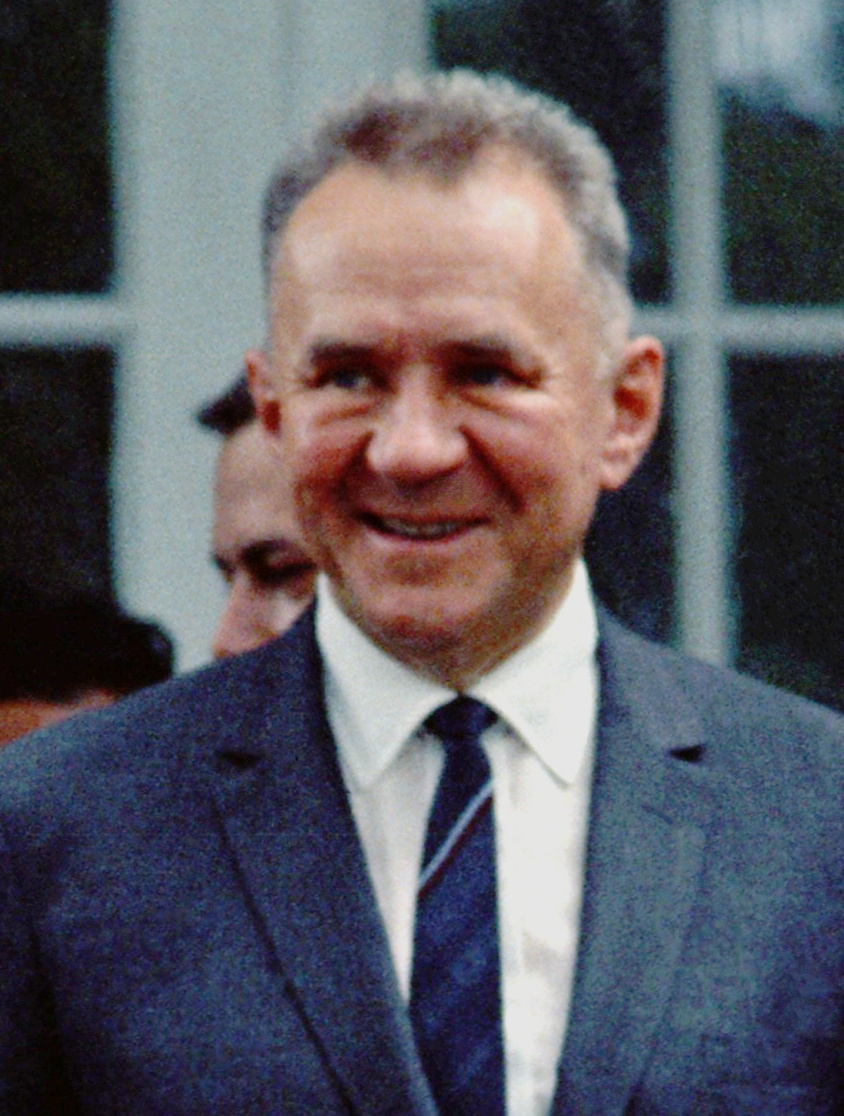
Alexei Kosygin was the longest-serving chairman of the Soviet government, holding office from 1964 until his death in 1980.

The Post-Stalin Era saw several changes to the government apparatus, especially during Nikita Khrushchev's leadership. At first, the new leadership sought to solve problems within the existing bureaucratic framework, however, by 1954 the government initiated reforms which devolve more economic decision-making to the republican governments. Around this time Khrushchev suggested abolishing the industrial and construction ministries and distributing their duties and responsibilities to republican governments and regional bureaucrats. The end-goal was to reduce the size of the All-Union government and increase economic growth. A similar idea was proposed to the CPSU Presidium in January 1957. The proposal sought to switch the function of the All-Union government from active management of operational management of industry to active branch policy-making. Operational management was to be decentralised to republican governments and local authorities.

The CPSU Presidium adopted Khrushchev's proposal. By July 1957 the management functions of the construction and industrial ministries had been transferred to 105 newly established Soviets of the National Economy. Republican planning committees were given more responsibility, while the State Planning Committee was given responsibility over companies that could not be decentralised to republican governments. The Soviet media began propagating the idea of developing complex, regional economies and comparing them to the old ministerial system. The belief was that the Soviets of the National economy would increase inter-branch cooperation and specialization. However, the reforms did not manage to cure the failings of the Soviet economy, and actually showed shortcomings in other areas as well. Khrushchev's government responded by initiating reforms that reversed decentralisation measures, and sought to recentralise control over resource allocation.

=== Brezhnev government ===
The removal of Khrushchev was followed by reversing his reforms of the government apparatus. The first move came in early 1965 when Alexei Kosygin's First Government when the All-Union Ministry of Agriculture was regifted responsibility for agriculture (which it lost in one Khrushchev's earlier reforms). By October the same year the Council of Ministers abolished the industrial state committees and regional economic councils and reestablished the system of industrial ministers as they existed before 1957. Of the 33 newly appointed construction- and industry ministers appointed in 1965, twelve had served as ministers in 1957 or before and ten had worked and risen to the rank of deputy minister by this time. This was followed by the establishment of the All-Union Ministry of Education and the All-Union Ministry of Preservation of Public Order in 1966. Four All-Union construction ministries were established in 1967 and a fifth in 1972. In addition, in 1970 the government reestablished the All-Union Ministry of Justice. In the decade 1965 to 1975, twenty-eight industrial ministries were established. Of these seven were All-Union ministries and the remainder seventeen were republican ministries. In addition, the Kosygin Government sought to reform the economy by strengthening enterprise autonomy while at the same time retaining strong centralised authority. The 1979 Soviet economic reform also sought to de-regulate the economy to give state enterprises more autonomy, while giving state enterprises more room to discuss their production goals with their respective ministries.

The Brezhnev Era also saw the adoption of the 1977 constitution. It defined for the first time the responsibilities and membership of the government's Presidium. The constitution defined the Presidium as a permanent governmental organ responsible for establishing and securing good economic leadership and to assume administrative responsibilities. It stated that the government chairman, alongside the first deputy chairmen, deputy chairmen and the republican governmental heads made up the Presidium's membership.

=== Presidentialism and the Cabinet of Ministers (1990–1991) ===
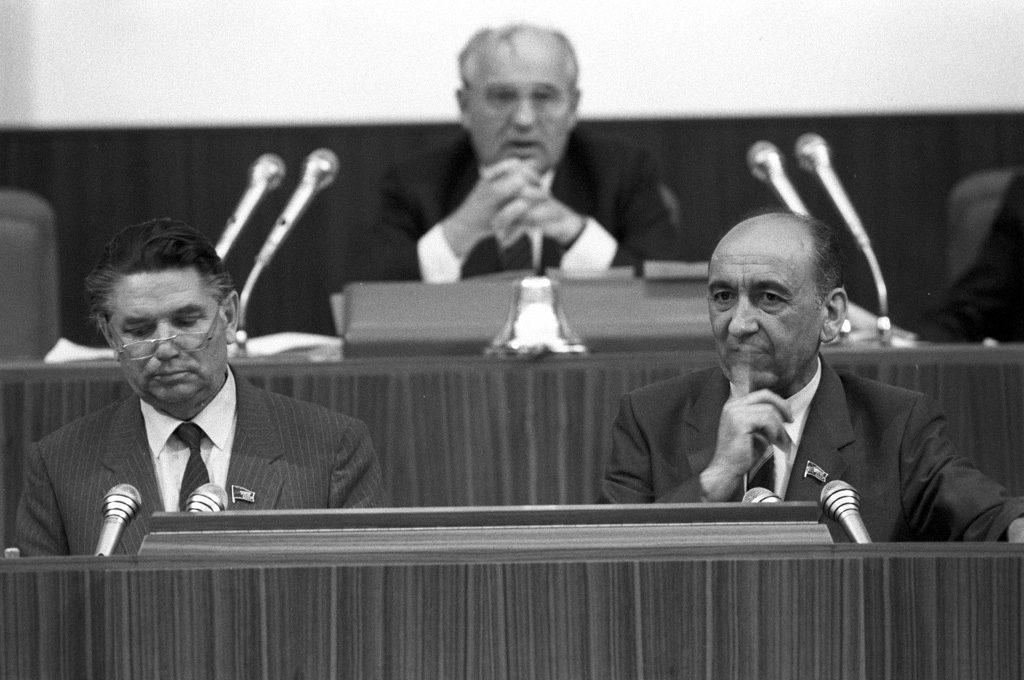
Gorbachev at the 1st Plenary Session of the I Congress of People's Deputies in 1989.

Gorbachev had been speaking critically of the idea of a Soviet presidency until October 1989. He had argued that a presidency could lead to the reestablishment of the cult of personality and one-man leadership. However, Gorbachev was meeting stiff resistance from bureaucrats and anti-reformist elements against his reformist policies. The establishment of the office of President of the Soviet Union was seen as an important tool to strengthen Gorbachev's control over the state apparatus. Gorbachev proposed to the 3rd Plenary Session of the XXI Supreme Soviet in February 1990 to establish the Office of the President of the Soviet Union. The Supreme Soviet passed the motion, and in March an Extraordinary Session of the Congress of People's Deputies was convened to amend the constitution. The Law on the Presidency which was adopted by the Congress of People's Deputies stated that the president had to be elected in a nationwide election, but Gorbachev argued that the country was not ready for divisive election. Therefore, the Congress of People's Deputies held a vote in which 1329 voted to elect Gorbachev as President of the Soviet Union, while 916 voted against him.

As President of the Soviet Union Gorbachev could appoint and dismiss government ministers. However, he grew concerned about his inability to control All-Union ministries. On 24 September 1990 Gorbachev managed to get the Supreme Soviet to grant him temporary powers of unrestricted decrees on the economy, law and order and appointment of government personnel until 31 March 1992. Still feeling stifled by anti-reformist elements, Gorbachev proposed in November 1990 to radically reorganise the Soviet political system, being greatly inspired by the presidential system of the United States and the semi-presidential system of France. Gorbachev sought to reorganise institutions at the All-Union level by subordinating executive power to the presidency.

By November 1990 Gorbachev was calling for the dissolution of the Council of Ministers and its replacement with a Cabinet of Ministers. Formerly executive power had been divided into two separate institutions; the presidency and the Council of Ministers. Both reported to the Supreme Soviet. The Cabinet of Ministers would report directly to the President of the Soviet Union, and be accountable to both the presidency and to the Supreme Soviet. While the term of the Council of Ministers had been tied to the election of the Supreme Soviet, the Cabinet of Ministers was obliged by law to tender its resignation if the sitting president stepped down. Similar to the Council of Ministers, the leading decision-making organ of the Cabinet of Ministers was the Presidium. It was to be chaired by the newly created office of Prime Minister of the Soviet Union. In accordance with law the Presidium had to consist of the prime minister, his first deputies, deputies and an Administrator of Affairs.

The duties and responsibilities of the Cabinet of Ministers overlapped with the former Council of Ministers. It was responsible for formulating and executing the All-Union state budget, administrating defense enterprises and overseeing space research, implementing Soviet foreign policy, crime-fighting, and maintaining defense and state security. It also worked alongside the republican governments to develop financial and credit policy, administer fuel and power supplies and transport systems, and developing welfare and social programs. In addition the Cabinet of Ministers was responsible for coordinating All-Union policy on science, technology, patents, use of airspace, prices, general economic policy, housing, environmental protection and military appointments. At last, the Law on the Cabinet of Ministers granted the Cabinet of Ministers the right to issue decrees and resolutions, but not of the same power and scope of those formerly issued by the Council of Ministers.

The Council of Ministers had been the sole permanent executive and administrative body in the Soviet Union during its existence. The Cabinet of Ministers existed alongside the Federation Council, the Presidential Council and other executive organs that reported directly to the president. However, as the sole executive organ responsible for the economy and the ministries it was the most important.

The Cabinet of Ministers was by law forced to work more closely with republican governments than the Council of Ministers. Republican governments could petition the Cabinet of Ministers at any time, and the Cabinet of Ministers was forced to take all questions from republican governments into consideration. To foster better relations ministers moved to create collegiums with their republican counterparts. For instance, the All-Union Ministry of Culture established the Council of Ministers of Culture to better coordinate policies, while the All-Union Ministry of Foreign Affairs established the Council of Foreign Ministers of the USSR and Union Republics.

=== Government breakdown (1991) ===
The 1991 Soviet coup d'état attempt, better known as the August coup attempt, was initiated by the State Committee on the State of Emergency in a bid to oppose the enactment of the New Union Treaty. Prime Minister Valentin Pavlov was one of the leaders of the coup. The Cabinet of Ministers and most All-Union power organs supported the coup attempt against Gorbachev. In the aftermath of the coup attempt, Russian Soviet Federative Socialist Republic (Russian SFSR) led by Boris Yeltsin sought to weaken Gorbachev's presidential powers. The State Council was established. It superseded the government in terms of power by giving each republican president a seat on the council. In addition, every decision had to be decided by a vote–a move that greatly weakened Gorbachev's control. In tandem, the Russian SFSR seized the building and staff of the All-Union Ministry of Finance, the State Bank and the Bank for Foreign Economic Relations. With the central government's authority greatly weakened, Gorbachev established a four-man committee, led by Ivan Silayev, that included Grigory Yavlinsky, Arkady Volsky, and Yuri Luzhkov, to elect a new Cabinet of Ministers. This committee was later transformed into the Committee for the Operational Management of the National Economy (COMSE), also chaired by Silayev, to manage the Soviet economy. On 28 August 1991 a Supreme Soviet temporarily gave the COMSE the same authority as the Cabinet of Ministers, and Silayev became the Soviet Union's de facto Premier. The All-Union government tried to rebuff the seizure attempts by the Russian government. Still, by September 1991 the Soviet government had broken down.

On 25 December 1991 Gorbachev announced in a televised speech his resignation from the post of President of the Soviet Union. On the following day, the Soviet of the Republics voted to dissolve the Union of Soviet Socialist Republics as a state and subject of international law, legally terminating the Soviet government's existence.

== Duties, functions and responsibilities ==
The government was the highest executive and administrative body of the Soviet state. It was formed at the 1st Plenary Session of the Supreme Soviet (the joint meeting of the Soviet of the Union and the Soviet of Nationalities), and had to consist of the government chairman, his first deputies, deputies, ministers, state committees chairmen and the republican governmental chairmen. The premier could recommend individuals who he found suitable for membership in the governmental council to the Supreme Soviet. The government tendered its resignation to the first plenary session of a newly elected Supreme Soviet.

The government was responsible to the Supreme Soviet and its Presidium. It regularly reported to the Supreme Soviet on its work, as well as being tasked with resolving all state administrative duties in the jurisdiction of the USSR which were not the responsibility of the Supreme Soviet or the Presidium. Within its limits, the government had responsibility for:

- Management of the union's economy and socio-cultural construction and development.
- Formulation and submission of the five-year plans for "economic and social development" to the Supreme Soviet along with the state budget.
- Defence of the interests of state, socialist property, public order and to protect the rights of Soviet citizens.
- Ensuring state security.
- General policies for the Soviet armed forces and determination of how many citizens were to be drafted into service.
- General policies concerning Soviet foreign relations and trade, economic, scientific-technical and cultural cooperation of the USSR with foreign countries as well as the power to confirm or denounce international treaties signed by the USSR.
- Creation of necessary organisations within the government concerning economics, socio-cultural development and defence.

The government could issue decrees and resolutions and later verify their execution. All organisations were obliged to obey the decrees and resolutions issued by the government. The All-Union Council also had the power to suspend all mandates and decrees issued by itself or organisations subordinate to it. The Council coordinated and directed the work of the union republics and union ministries, state committees and other organs subordinate to it. The competence of the government and its Presidium with respect to their procedures and activities and the council's relationships with subordinate organs were defined in the Soviet constitution by the Law on the Council of Ministers of the USSR.

Each union republic and autonomous republic had its own governments formed by the republican legislature of the respective union republic or autonomous republic. Republican governments were not legally subordinate to the All-Union government, but they were obliged in their activities to be guided by the decrees and decisions of the All-Union government. At the same time, the union-republican ministries had double subordination – they simultaneously submitted to the union republican government, within the framework of which they were created, and to the corresponding all-union government, orders and instructions which should have been guided in their activities. In contrast to the union republican ministries of the union republic, the republican ministries were subordinate only to the government of the corresponding union republic.

=== Party-government relations ===
Lenin sought to create a governmental structure that was independent of the party apparatus. Valerian Osinsky echoed Lenin's criticism, but Grigory Zinoviev responded to criticism in 1923 by stating that "Everyone understands that our Politburo is the principal body of the state." Boris Bazhanov, the private secretary of Joseph Stalin, echoed the same sentiments. According to Bazhanov appointment of people's commissars were made by the party Politburo and ratified later by the Council of People's Commissars. This informal system of government, in which the party decides and the government implements, lasted until Mikhail Gorbachev's tenure as leader.

== Leadership ==
=== Chairman ===
The government chairman was until the establishment of the Cabinet of Ministers in 1991 the Soviet head of government. The officeholder was responsible for convening the government and its Presidium, reporting to the Supreme Soviet on behalf of the government and leading the work on formulating the five-year plans. The "Law on the Council of Ministers of the USSR" states that the chairman "heads the Government and directs its activity... coordinates the activity of the first deputy chairmen and deputy chairmen [and] in urgent cases, makes decisions on particular questions of state administration."

=== Deputy Chairmen ===
The government appointed first deputy chairmen and deputy chairmen to assist the work of the government chairman. These deputies worked with the responsibilities allocated to them by the government. They could coordinate the activities of ministries, state committees and other organs subordinated to the government, take control of these organs and issue day-to-day instructions. At last, they could give prior consideration to proposals and draft decisions submitted to the government. For example, Kirill Mazurov was responsible for industry, and Dmitry Polyansky was responsible for agriculture in Kosygin's Second Government. In the case of the government chairman not being able to perform his duties one of the first deputy chairmen would take on the role of acting head of government until the premier's return.

=== Administrator of Affairs ===
The Administrator of Affairs was tasked with co-signing decrees and resolutions made by government with the government chairman. The government apparatus prepared items of policy, which the officeholder would check systematically against decrees of the party-government. This function consisted of several departments and other structural units. In addition the Administrator of Affairs headed the government apparatus and was a member of the government's Presidium.

=== Presidium ===
The Presidium of the Council of Ministers consisted of the chairman, First Deputy Chairmen, and the deputy chairman. The Presidium of the Council of Ministers is different than the Presidium of the Supreme Soviet.

== Organization ==
=== Committees ===
USSR state committees were different from the ministries in that a state committee was primarily responsible for several parts of government as opposed to the one specific topic for which a ministry was solely responsible. Therefore, many state committees had jurisdiction over certain common activities performed by ministries such as research and development, standardisation, planning, building construction, state security, publishing, archiving and so on. The distinction between a ministry and a state committee could be obscure as for the case of the Committee for State Security (KGB).

=== Ministries ===
According to the Soviet constitution, ministries were divided into all-union and union-republican. All-Union ministries managed the branch of state administration entrusted to them throughout the entire Soviet Union directly or through the organs appointed by them, while the union-republican ministries operated, as a rule, through the same-named ministry of the specific union republic in question. It managed only a certain limited number of activities directly according to the list approved by the Presidium of the Supreme Soviet.

The government had the right to create, reorganize and abolish subordinate institutions, which were directly subordinate to the government itself.

=== Publications ===
- The newspaper Izvestia
- "Bulletin of the Central Executive Committee, the Council of People's Commissars and the Council of Labor and Defense of the Soviet Union" (1923–1924);
- "Collection of laws and regulations of the Workers' and Peasants' Government of the Soviet Union" (1924–1938);
- "Collection of decrees and orders of the Government of the Soviet Union" (1938–1946).

== See also ==
- Bibliography of the Russian Revolution and Civil War § Government
- Bibliography of Stalinism and the Soviet Union § Government
- Bibliography of the Post Stalinist Soviet Union § Government and politics
- List of governments of the Soviet Union
- List of heads of government of Russia
- List of heads of state of the Soviet Union
- Premier of the Soviet Union

== Bibliography ==
- Churchward, L.G. (1975). Contemporary Soviet Government. Taylor & Francis. ISBN 978-0-7100-8202-2.
- Feldbrugge, F. J. M. (1993). Russian Law: The End of the Soviet System and the Role of Law. Martinus Nijhoff Publishers. ISBN 0-79232-359-9.
- Gorlizki, Y. (2002). "Ordinary Stalinism: The Council of Ministers and the Soviet Neopatrimonial State, 1946–1953". The Journal of Modern History. 74 (4). The University of Chicago Press: 699–736. doi:10.1086/376210. S2CID 144039204.
- Gorlizki, Y.; Khlevniuk, Oleg (2005). Cold Peace: Stalin and the Soviet Ruling Circle, 1945–1953. Oxford University Press. ISBN 0-19530-420-9.
- Harris, J. (2008). Party Leadership under Stalin and Khrushchev: Party Officials and the Soviet State, 1948–1964. Rowman & Littlefield. ISBN 978-1-49852-839-9.
- Hough, J; Fainsod, Merle (1979). How the Soviet Union is Governed. Cambridge: Harvard University Press.
- Huskey, E. (1992). Executive Power and Soviet Politics: The Rise and Decline of the Soviet State. M.E. Sharpe. ISBN 1-56324-059-9.
- Kibita, N. (2013). Soviet Economic Management under Khrushchev: The Sovnarkhoz Reform. Routledge. ISBN 978-0-415-60568-7.
- Nove, A. (1987). The Soviet Economic System (3rd ed.). Unwin Hyman. ISBN 0-04335-042-9.
- Rees, E. A. (2003). The Nature of Stalin's Dictatorship: The Politburo 1928–1953. Springer. ISBN 0-23052-428-1.
- Schapiro, L. (1977). The Government and Politics of the Soviet Union. Taylor & Francis. ISBN 978-0-09-131721-8.
- Watson, D. (2016). Molotov and Soviet Government: Sovnarkom, 1930–41. Springer. ISBN 978-1-34924-848-3.

Previous: All-Russian Council of People's Commissars	Government ruling Russia proper 1922–1991	Next: Government of Russia; 1991–present
Previous: All-Russian Council of People's Commissars	Representative for the Soviet Union in the United Nations; 1945–1991	Next: Representative for the Government of the Russian Federation in the United Nations; 1991–present
