= 1990 Soviet Union presidential election =

- 14 March 1990
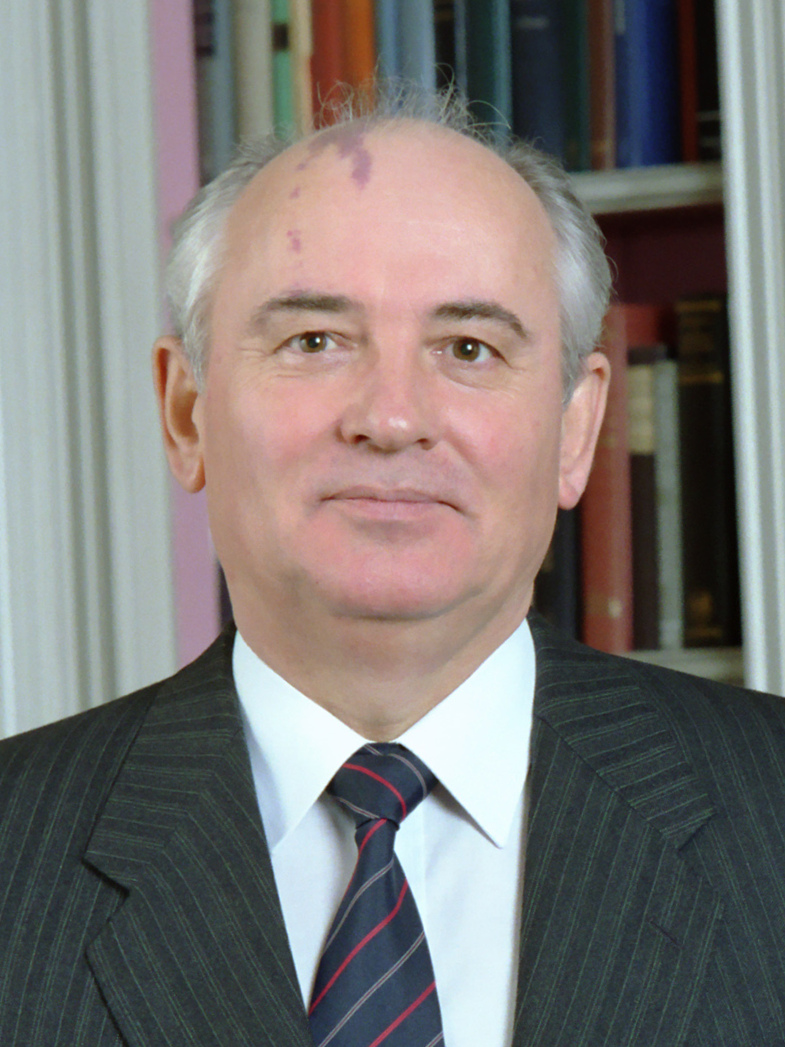
Candidate	Mikhail Gorbachev
Party	CPSU
Electoral vote	1,329
Percentage	72.86%
President before election
Office established
Elected President
Mikhail Gorbachev
CPSU

The 1990 Soviet Union presidential election was held in the Soviet Union on 14 March 1990 to elect a president for a five-year term. This was the first and only presidential election to be held in the Soviet Union. This was due to the office of president being established in 1990, a year before the dissolution of the Soviet Union in 1991. The elections were uncontested, with Mikhail Gorbachev, then-General Secretary of the Communist Party of the Soviet Union as the only candidate.

Although the constitution required the president to be directly-elected, it was decided that the first elections should be held on an indirect basis as it was necessary for a president to be elected immediately and processes taking place in the country did not leave time for elections to be held.

== Background ==
On 7 February 1990, about a month prior to the election, Communist Party leaders voted on establishing a presidency. The third (extraordinary) Congress of People's Deputies of the USSR began on 12 March 1990. The congress decided to create the post of President of the USSR. The president would be elected to five-year terms. The CPD would elect the president for this election cycle, then turn over future elections to the public starting in 1995—which never happened due to the USSR's collapse in 1991.

== Candidates ==
On 14 March, during a plenum of the CPSU Central Committee, Gorbachev, Interior Minister Vadim Bakatin and former Prime Minister Nikolai Ryzhkov were nominated as presidential candidates; however, Bakatin and Ryzhkov withdrew their candidacies.

=== Nominee ===
Communist Party
Mikhail Gorbachev

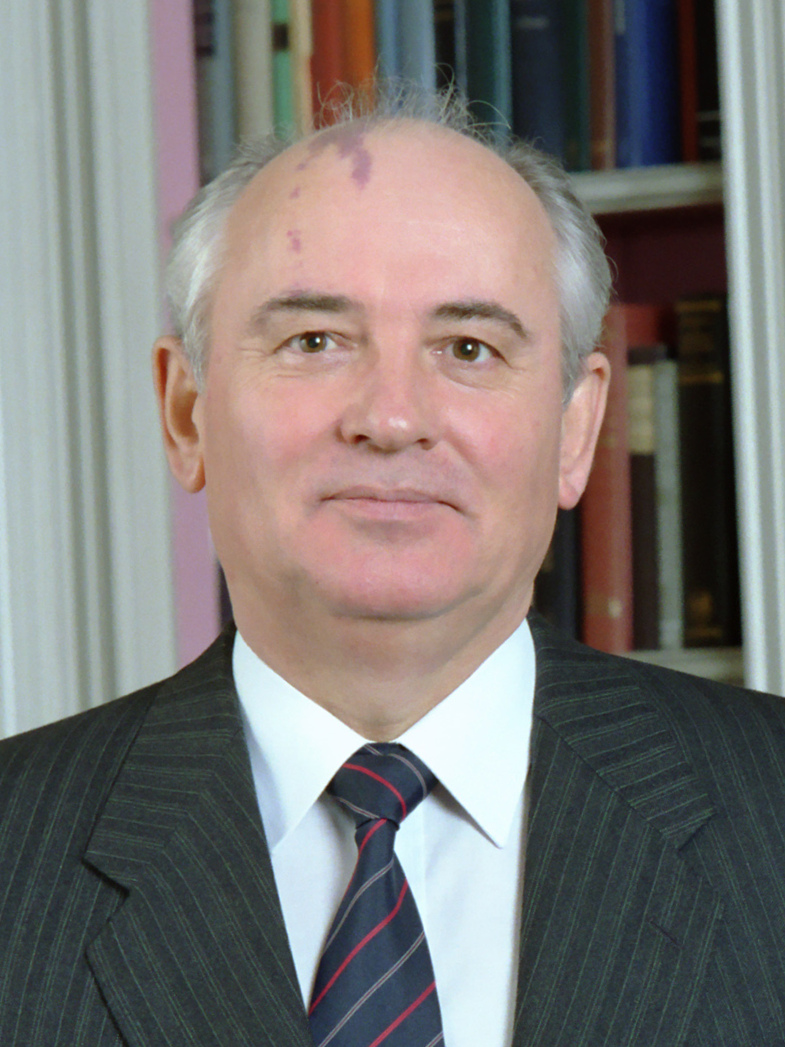

Chairman of the Supreme Soviet of the Soviet Union
(1989–1990)

=== Withdrew ===
Candidate	Political office
Vadim Bakatin	Minister of Interior (1988–1990)
Nikolai Ryzhkov	Chairman of the Council of Ministers (1985–1991)

== Mikhail Gorbachev's campaign ==
Gorbachev worked with the Congress to make sure that he secured a two-thirds majority; otherwise, he would have to campaign against other candidates in a general election. One of the tactics he used was repeatedly threatening to resign if a two-thirds majority wasn't attained.

== Results ==
At the time of the elections, 2,245 of the 2,250 seats were filled; however, 245 did not attend the Congress and a further 122 did not vote.

Candidate	Party	Votes	%
Mikhail Gorbachev	Communist Party of the Soviet Union	1,329	72.86
Against		495	27.14
Total		1,824	100.00
Valid votes		1,824	97.12
Invalid/blank votes		54	2.88
Total votes		1,878	100.00
Registered voters/turnout		2,245	83.65
Source: BBC

== Aftermath ==
On 15 March, the day after the election, at a meeting of the Congress of People's Deputies, Gorbachev took office as President. On 24 March, 10 days after the election, President Gorbachev appointed his cabinet.

== Reactions ==
The means of this election drew mixed reactions. Sergei Stankevich, a deputy from Moscow, decided that he would abstain from voting, despite supporting Gorbachev, because he believed that the new president should face a nationwide vote. Others were upset with the lack of real opposition against Gorbachev for a position that sought to increase democracy throughout the Soviet Union. Sakhalin Island Deputy Ivan Zhdakayev expressed discontent over this: "Elections mean a popular vote, not this charade." Kazakhstani Deputy Olzhas Suleimenov believed that reforms under Gorbachev were inconsistent.
