= Lev Voronin =

Soviet politician

- Лев Воронин
- Voronin in 1991

Permanent Representative of the USSR to the European Community
- In office March 1991 – September 1991
- Premier: Valentin Pavlov
- Preceded by: Vladimir Shemyatenkov
- Succeeded by: Ivan Silayev (for the Russian Federation)

First Deputy Chairman of the Council of Ministers of the Soviet Union
- In office 17 July 1989 – 26 December 1990
- Premier: Nikolai Ryzhkov
- Preceded by: Yuri Maslyukov
- Succeeded by: Vladilen Nikitin

Deputy Chairman of the Council of Ministers of the Soviet Union
- In office 15 November 1985 – 7 June 1989
- Premier: Nikolai Ryzhkov
- Preceded by: Ivan Silayev
- Succeeded by: Yuri Maslyukov

Personal details
- Born: 22 February 1928 Perm, Russian SFSR, Soviet Union
- Died: 24 June 2008 (aged 80) Moscow, Russia
- Party: Communist Party of the Soviet Union (1953–1991)

Lev Alekseyevich Voronin (Russian: Лев Алексеевич Воронин; 22 February 1928 – 24 June 2008) was a Soviet and Russian official. He served as a First Deputy Chairman of the Council of Ministers, literally the Vice-Premier of the Soviet Union, from 1989 to 1990. Responsible for the "general issues" of the cultural and economic administration of the Soviet Union during the late Gorbachev Era, Voronin became acting Chairman of the Council of Ministers in between Nikolai Ryzhkov's hospitalization and Valentin Pavlov's election as Prime Minister. Voronin worked as a banker following the dissolution of the Soviet Union.

== Early life and career ==
Voronin was born on 22 February 1928 in the city of Perm, Russian Soviet Federative Socialist Republic, Soviet Union. He graduated as a mechanical engineer from the Ural Polytechnic Institute in 1949. In 1953 Voronin became a member of the Communist Party of the Soviet Union (CPSU).

Voronin, along with the six other Deputy Premiers, had a career background in the Soviet military–industrial complex. He started working at an industrial plant in Sverdlovsk in 1949 as a common worker and eventually became the plant's manager. From 1959 to 1963 Voronin was a chief engineer in a plant located in the Kamensk-Ural Sverdlovsk region, and from 1963 he started to work as a chief engineer for a plant in the Urals for the Sverdlovsk Supreme Soviet of the National Economy. Later that year Voronin was appointed to the post of head of the radio and electronics industries.

He became the Director of the Krasnogorsk Mechanical Plant under the jurisdiction of the Ministry of Defense Industry in 1965 under Premier Alexei Kosygin and became the Director of the Production Planning Department of the Ministry of Defense Industry in 1969. He was Deputy Minister of Defense Industry from 1972 to 1979 and First Deputy Minister of Defense Industry from 1979 to 1980. From 1980 to 1982 Voronin was responsible for overseeing the military-industrial complex through his post in the State Planning Committee. In 1984, during his tenureship as Deputy Chairman of the State Planning Committee, he wrote to the Council of Ministers, then headed by Nikolai Tikhonov, that the overcreation of jobs caused by extensive growth was harming labor productivity. From 1980 to 1989 Voronin was a Deputy of the Supreme Soviet of the Soviet Union, and from 1981 to 1991 he was a member of the CPSU Central Committee.

== Political career ==
Voronov was one of several appointees of Nikolai Ryzhkov during his Central Committee Secretaryship to the Soviet leadership. As First Deputy Chairman of the State Planning Committee in February 1983 Voronov proposed giving enterprises more autonomy from the central government. This policy was later enacted, and Voronov became the chairman of a Council of Ministers commission which oversaw its implementation in certain sectors of the economy. Voronin was one of two First Deputy Chairmen of the State Planning Committee under the chairmanship of Nikolai Baibakov. The other First Deputy Chairman, Yuri Maslyukov, became the Chairman of the State Planning Committee when Baibakov resigned on 14 October 1985. As First Deputy Chairman of the State Planning Committee Voronin oversaw planning of the civilian sectors of the economy. Both Voronin and Maslyukov were allies of General Secretary Mikhail Gorbachev and Ryzhkov, the Chairman of the Council of Ministers.

From 15 November 1985 to 7 June 1989 Voronin was simultaneously a Deputy Chairman of the Council of Ministers and the Chairman of the State Committee for Material and Technical Supply. As First Deputy Chairman of the Council of Ministers Voronin was a member of the Presidium of the Council of Ministers, and he was officially responsible for "general issues" of the economy. When the Supreme Soviet of the Moldavian Soviet Socialist Republic adopted Moldovan as their only official language, and Russian as a secondary one, several strikes began in Transnistria in 1989. Gorbachev sent Voronin to discuss the situation with the strikers and their leaders. When Ryzhkov suffered a heart attack in late December 1991, Voronin was acting Premier of the Soviet Union, until Ryzhkov was succeeded in office by Valentin Pavlov on 14 January 1991. From March to September 1991 Voronin was the Permanent Representative of the USSR to the European Community.

== Later life and death ==
Voronin worked from 1992 or 1996, until his death as a Vice President of Montazhspetsbank, a Russian commercial bank. Voronin died on 24 June 2008 in Moscow, Russian Federation. He is buried at the Troekurovsky cemetery.

== Decorations and awards ==
- Order of Lenin
- Order of the Red Banner of Labour
- Order of the Badge of Honour
- Lenin Prize
- Certificate of Honour of the Government of the Russian Federation
