= 1988 October Revolution Parade =

The 1988 October Revolution Parade was a parade that took place in Red Square in Moscow on November 7, 1988, to commemorate the 71st anniversary of the 1917 October Revolution. Mikhail Gorbachev the General Secretary of the Communist Party of the Soviet Union, Nikolai Ryzhkov the Premier of the Soviet Union, along with other senior officials within the Communist Party of the Soviet Union viewed the parade from the grandstand Lenin's Mausoleum.

== Parades in Soviet Republics and cities ==
(Latvian Soviet Socialist Republic) Riga, Latvian SSR

== Gallery ==
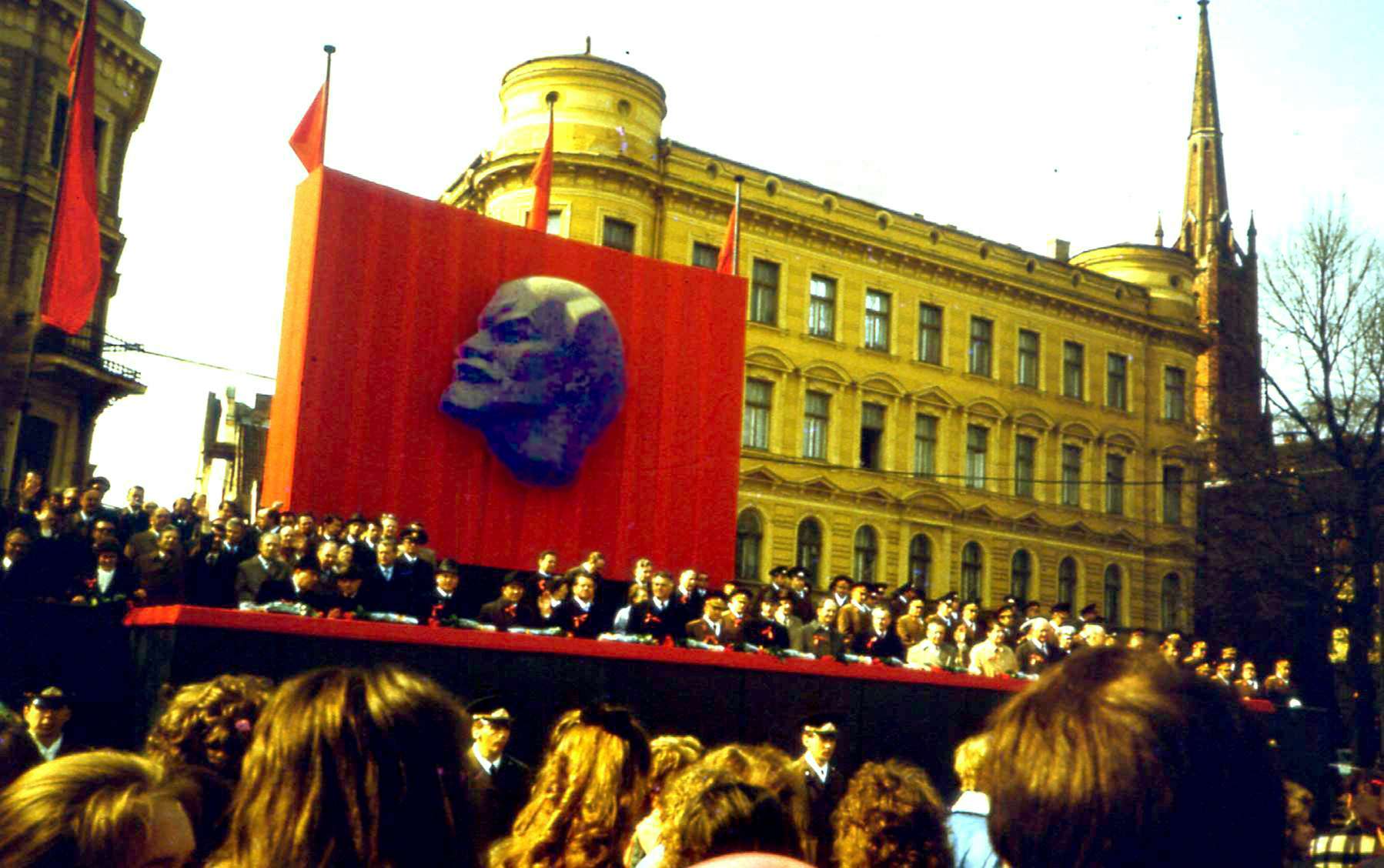
Parade in Riga
