= Vladilen Nikitin =

Russian engineer and politician (1936–2021)

- Владилен Никитин

First Deputy Prime Minister of the Council of Ministers
- In office 27 July 1989 – 31 August 1990
- Premier: Nikolai Ryzhkov

Minister of Agriculture
- In office 28 May – 23 November 1985
- Premier: Nikolai Ryzhkov
- Preceded by: Vitaly Vorotnikov
- Succeeded by: Victor Nikonov

Personal details
- Born: 30 October 1936 Omsk, RSFSR, Soviet Union
- Died: 27 May 2021 (aged 84)
- Resting place: Vagankovo Cemetery, Moscow, Russia
- Party: Communist Party
- Education: Omsk Agricultural Institute; Higher Party School
- Awards: Order of the October Revolution Order of the Red Banner of Labour

Vladilen Valentinovich Nikitin (Russian: Владилен Валентинович Никитин; 30 October 1936 – 27 May 2021) was a Soviet Russian engineer and politician. He served as first deputy premier during the Gorbachev Era.

== Biography ==
Nikitin was born in 1936. He attended the Omsk Agricultural Institute and then the Higher Party School at the CPSU Central Committee and graduated with a degree in mechanical engineering.

Nikitin worked as senior engineer until 1976 when he was appointed chairman of the Tyumen Oblast. In 1985, he became minister of agriculture and then first deputy chairman of the state agroindustrial committee, Gosagroprom. He served as first deputy prime minister under Soviet President Mikhail Gorbachev. He was also appointed chairman of the state commission for food and purchasing, becoming the first executive of the body. He was fired by Gorbachev on 31 August 1990 due to cigarette shortage which caused demonstrations in Moscow.

He died on 27 May 2021, and was buried at the Vagankovo Cemetery.
