= Federation Council of the Soviet Union =

Upper house of the Federal Assembly of Russia

Federation Council of the USSR
- Совет Федерации СССР

Agency overview
- Formed: 14 March 1990
- Dissolved: 5 September 1991
- Superseding agency: State Council of the Soviet Union
- Jurisdiction: Union of Soviet Socialist Republics
- Headquarters: Moscow, Russian SFSR, USSR

The Federation Council, (Note: Russian: Совет Федерации, romanized: Sovet Federatsii, common abbreviation: Совфед, Sovfed) was an advisory government body in the USSR in 1990–1991, which included the President of the USSR, the Vice President of the USSR (since December 1990), and the heads of the union republics.

== History ==
The Federation Council of the USSR was established following the adoption of the USSR Law No. 1360-I on March 14, 1990, titled “On the Establishment of the Post of President of the USSR and Amendments and Additions to the Constitution (Basic Law) of the USSR.” Under this law, the President of the Soviet Union was designated as the head of the Federation Council, which was composed of the highest state officials of the union republics. Additionally, the Chairman of the Supreme Soviet of the USSR, the chairpersons of both chambers of the Supreme Soviet, and the top officials of the autonomous republics, autonomous regions, and autonomous districts were granted the right to participate in its meetings.

The powers of the Federation Council were defined in Article 127.4 of the amended Soviet Constitution:

- To consider matters related to compliance with the Union Treaty;
- To develop measures for implementing the national policy of the Soviet state;
- To submit recommendations to the Council of Nationalities of the Supreme Soviet regarding the resolution of disputes and interethnic conflicts;
- To coordinate the activities of the union republics and ensure their involvement in matters of all-Union importance under the jurisdiction of the President of the USSR.

Article 127.6 of the Constitution of the Soviet Union also provided for the President of the USSR to convene joint sessions of the Federation Council and the Presidential Council for addressing key issues of domestic and foreign policy.

The official residence of the Federation Council was designated as the Kremlin in Moscow, as established by Presidential Decree No. 1 dated March 21, 1990.

The Federation Council effectively ceased functioning following the enactment of the USSR Law No. 2392-I on September 5, 1991, “On the Bodies of State Power and Administration of the USSR During the Transition Period.” Although the law introduced the State Council as a replacement, no formal amendments to the Constitution were made to reflect this structural change.

== Membership ==
=== Officers ===
- Mikhail Gorbachev, President of the Soviet Union
- Gennady Yanayev, Vice president of the Soviet Union

=== Representatives of the union republics ===
Country	Leader	Term start	Term end	Picture
Azerbaijan SSR	Elmira Gafarova	14 March 1990	16 May 1990	
Azerbaijan SSR	Ayaz Mutallibov	18 May 1990	5 September 1991	
Armenian SSR	Grant Voskanyan	14 March 1990	4 August 1990	
Armenian SSR	Levon Ter-Petrosyan	4 August 1990	5 September 1991	
Byelorussian SSR	Nikolai Dementey	14 March 1990	25 August 1991	
Byelorussian SSR	Stanislav Shushkevich	25 August 1991	5 September 1991	
Estonian SSR	Arnold Rüütel	14 March 1990	5 September 1991	
Georgian SSR	Givi Gumbaridze	14 March 1990	14 November 1990	
Georgian SSR	Zviad Gamsakhurdia	14 November 1990	5 September 1991	
Kazakh SSR	Nursultan Nazarbayev	14 March 1990	5 September 1991	
Kirghiz SSR	Tashtanbek Akmatov	14 March 1990	10 April 1990	
Kirghiz SSR	Absamat Masaliyev	10 April 1990	27 October 1990	
Kirghiz SSR	Askar Akayev	27 October 1990	5 September 1991	
Latvian SSR	Anatolijs Gorbunovs	14 March 1990	5 September 1991	
Lithuanian SSR	Vytautas Landsbergis	14 March 1990	5 September 1991	
Moldavian SSR	Mircea Snegur	14 March 1990	5 September 1991	
Russian SFSR	Vitaly Vorotnikov	14 March 1990	29 May 1990	
Russian SFSR	Boris Yeltsin	29 May 1990	5 September 1991	
Tajik SSR	Gaibnazar Pallaev	14 March 1990	12 April 1990	
Tajik SSR	Qahhor Mahkamov	12 April 1990	31 August 1991	
Tajik SSR	Qadriddin Aslonov	31 August 1991	5 September 1991	
Turkmen SSR	Saparmurat Niyazov	14 March 1990	5 September 1991	
Uzbek SSR	Mirzaolim Ibragimov	14 March 1990	24 March 1990	
Uzbek SSR	Islam Karimov	24 March 1990	5 September 1991	
Ukrainian SSR	Valentyna Shevchenko	14 March 1990	4 June 1990	
Ukrainian SSR	Vladimir Ivashko	4 June 1990	9 July 1990	
Ukrainian SSR	Ivan Plyushch	9 July 1990	23 July 1990	
Ukrainian SSR	Leonid Kravchuk	23 July 1990	5 September 1991	

== See also ==
- List of deputy chairmen of the Federation Council of Russia
- Politics of Russia
