= President of the Soviet Union =

Head of state of the USSR in 1990–91; only held by Mikhail Gorbachev

President of the Union of Soviet Socialist Republics
- Президент Союза Советских Социалистических Республик
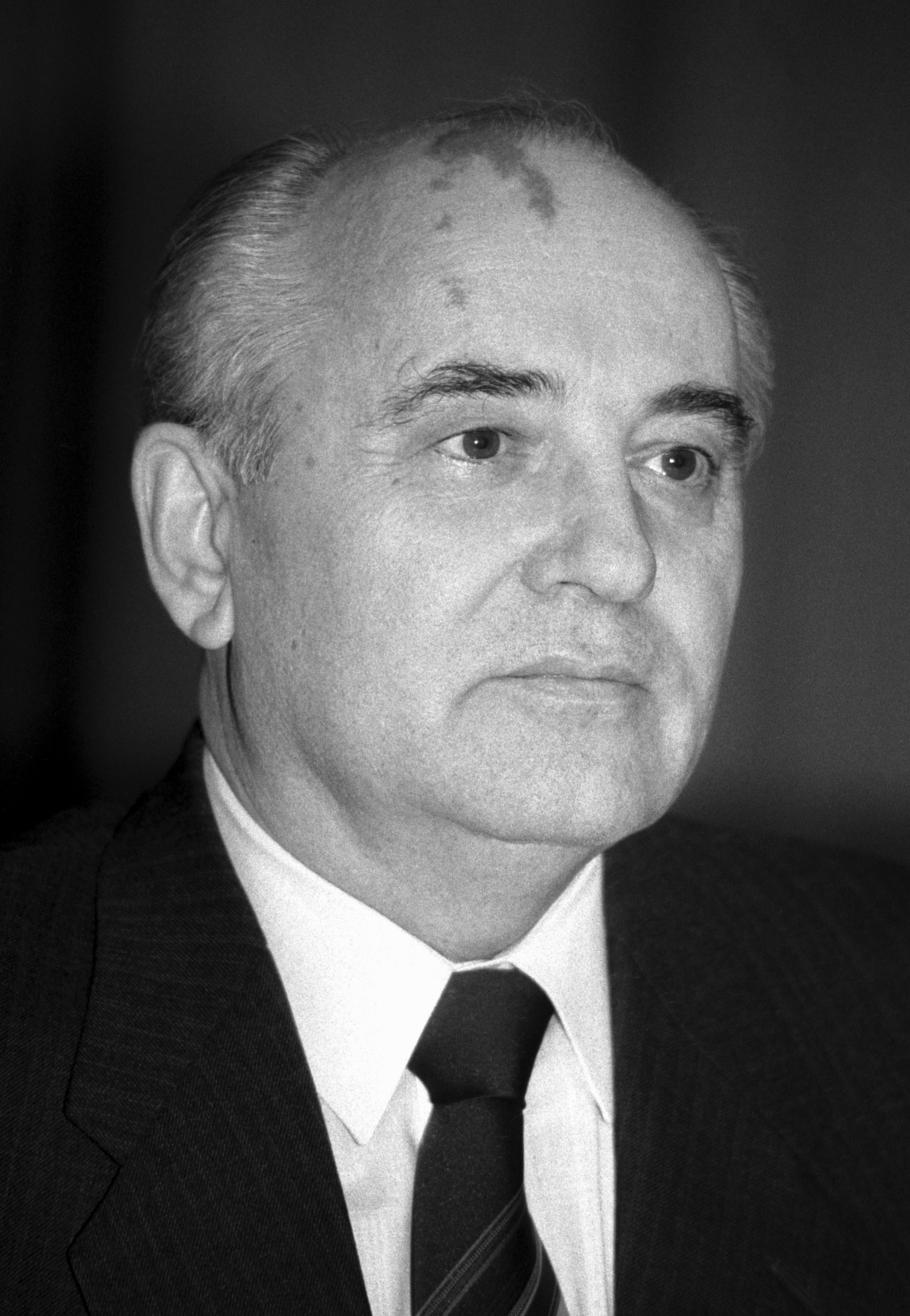
- Only office holder Mikhail Gorbachev; 15 March 1990 – 25 December 1991 (Note: Briefly suspended from 19 to 21 August 1991 during the August Coup.)
- Presidium of the Supreme Soviet; Government of the Soviet Union
- Style: Mr. President (informal); His Excellency (diplomatic); Comrade Supreme Commander (military)
- Type: Head of state
- Residence: Kremlin Senate, Moscow
- Appointer: Direct election (constitutional); Congress of People's Deputies (inaugurual holder)
- Precursor: Presidium of the Supreme Soviet (as head of state)
- Formation: 15 March 1990; 36 years ago
- First holder: Mikhail Gorbachev
- Final holder: Mikhail Gorbachev
- Abolished: 25 December 1991; 34 years ago
- Succession: None (USSR dissolved) (Note: Functions are succeeded by the CIS Executive Secretary and the President of Russia.)
- Deputy: Vice President of the Soviet Union

The president of the Soviet Union (Russian: Президент Советского Союза, romanized: Prezident Sovetskogo Soyuza), officially the president of the Union of Soviet Socialist Republics (Президент Союза Советских Социалистических Республик), abbreviated as president of the USSR (Президент СССР), was the executive head of state of the Union of Soviet Socialist Republics from 15 March 1990 to 25 December 1991.

Mikhail Gorbachev was the only person to occupy this office. Gorbachev was also General Secretary of the Communist Party of the Soviet Union between March 1985 and August 1991. He derived an increasingly large share of his power from his position as president through his resignation as General Secretary following the 1991 coup d'état attempt.

== History ==
The idea of the institution of a sole head of state (instead of collegial leadership) first appeared during the preparation of the draft 1936 Soviet Constitution. However, at the suggestion of Communist Party leader Joseph Stalin, the idea was rejected. He formally justified the reason for this rejection as "[running] counter to the spirit of [the] Constitution", and elaborated:

According to the system of our Constitution there must not be an individual president in the U.S.S.R., elected by the whole population on a par with the Supreme Soviet, and able to put himself in opposition to the Supreme Soviet. The president in the U.S.S.R. is a collegium, it is the Presidium of the Supreme Soviet, including the President of the Presidium of the Supreme Soviet, elected, not by the whole population, but by the Supreme Soviet, and accountable to the Supreme Soviet. Historical experience shows that such a structure of the supreme bodies is the most democratic, and safeguards the country against undesirable contingencies.

Nonetheless, the establishment of a singular Presidency was considered during the elaboration of the next Soviet Constitution, both at the first attempt under Nikita Khrushchev in the early to mid-1960s and at the second, successful attempt under Leonid Brezhnev in the mid-to-late 1970s. The latter attempt at establishing a Presidency formed a part of Brezhnev's attempts at sidelining Nikolai Podgorny, who, as Chairman of the Presidium of the Supreme Soviet, was the formal head of state and first-ranked in diplomatic protocol; an alternative path to making Brezhnev head of state, by establishing a collegial State Council similar to those of East Germany, Bulgaria, and Romania, of which he would be the chairman, was also considered. In both instances, the collegial Presidium of the Supreme Soviet was ultimately retained as the highest body of power in the country.

Members of the Communist Party voted on establishing a presidency on 7 February 1990. The first and only presidential election took place on 14 March 1990. The Congress of People's Deputies decided that they would elect the first president into a five-year term, then turn over presidential elections to the public beginning in the planned 1995 presidential election.

== Powers ==
The presidency was an executive post, based on a mixture of the US and French presidencies.

Prior to the creation of the post of president, the de jure head of state of the Soviet Union was the chairman of the Presidium of the Supreme Soviet, who was often called the "president" by non-Soviet sources. For most of the Soviet Union's existence, all effective executive political power was in the hands of the General Secretary of the Communist Party of the Soviet Union, with the chairman of the Presidium exercising largely symbolic and figurehead duties. Starting with Leonid Brezhnev in 1977, the last four general secretaries—Brezhnev, Yuri Andropov, Konstantin Chernenko, and Gorbachev—simultaneously served as de jure head of state during their time in office.

The president was initially elected by the Congress of People's Deputies and served as ex officio chairman of that body, but all future elections were to have been by popular vote. The president reported to the Supreme Soviet. On 24 September 1990, Gorbachev persuaded the Supreme Soviet to give him the power to rule by unrestricted decree (on the economy, law and order, and the appointment of government personnel) until 31 March 1992. Another power was the right to declare direct presidential rule in troubled areas and abolish democratic elected bodies if necessary. During the election of the president several candidates were nominated, among leading contenders were KGB Chairman Vadim Bakatin and Premier Nikolai Ryzhkov.

The president's powers were:

- Commander in chief of the armed forces
- The ability to propose and veto legislation
- The ability to appoint the Prime Minister (who would then have to be approved by the Supreme Soviet), or, if necessary, to dismiss the Prime Minister, among other government ministers and officials
- The declaration of states of emergency or martial law within the borders of the Soviet Union
- The nation's top representative abroad, with the ability to sign international treaties
- The ability to call for national referendums on important issues
- The ability to assign military ranks and honorary titles
- The power to restore citizenship to exiles or internal dissidents
- The ability to overrule government decisions that violated the constitution or endangered citizens rights and freedoms

The vice president of the Soviet Union was the deputy head of state. If the president was killed or unable to be in office, the vice president would become president. The only person to hold this office was Gennady Yanayev, who the following year became the leader of the Gang of Eight which attempted the August coup, assuming the position of acting president of the Soviet Union on 19 August 1991. After three days the coup collapsed and Gorbachev was restored.

Following the coup attempt, Gorbachev remained president until the country's dissolution, when he resigned and declared his office to be extinct. The powers of the position were subsequently ceded to the new President of Russia, Boris Yeltsin.

== Oath ==
With his right hand on a red bound copy of the Soviet Constitution, placed on a small table before the Congress, President-elect Gorbachev took the following oath: "I solemnly swear to faithfully serve the peoples of our nations, to strictly observe the Soviet Constitution, to guarantee the rights and freedoms of citizens and to conscientiously fulfill the high responsibilities placed in me as president of the Soviet Union."

== Presidential Administration ==
- State Council of the Soviet Union
- Presidential Council
- Political Advisory Council under the President
- Federation Council
- Defense Council
- Security Council

== List ==
No.	Portrait	Name (Born-Died)	Term of office			Political Party	Election	Vice President	Prime Ministers
No.	Portrait	Name (Born-Died)	Took office	Left office	Time in office	Political Party	Election	Vice President	Prime Ministers
1		Mikhail Gorbachev (1931–2022)	15 March 1990	25 December 1991	1 year, 285 days	Communist Party of the Soviet Union	1990	Office vacant (until 27 December 1990)	Nikolai Ryzhkov
1		Mikhail Gorbachev (1931–2022)	15 March 1990	25 December 1991	1 year, 285 days	Communist Party of the Soviet Union	1990	Gennady Yanayev	Valentin Pavlov
1		Mikhail Gorbachev (1931–2022)	15 March 1990	25 December 1991	1 year, 285 days	Communist Party of the Soviet Union	1990	Office abolished (after 21 August 1991)	Ivan Silayev
—		Gennady Yanayev (1937–2010); Acting, disputed	19 August 1991	21 August 1991	2 days	Communist Party of the Soviet Union	—	Office vacant	Valentin Pavlov
—		Office vacant	25 December 1991	26 December 1991	1 day	—	—	Office vacant	Office vacant

== See also ==
- 1990 Soviet Union presidential election
- List of presidents of Russia
- List of heads of state of the Soviet Union
- Premier of the Soviet Union
- General Secretary of the Communist Party of the Soviet Union
- List of leaders of the Soviet Union
- President of Russia
