= Nikolai Ryzhkov =

Russian politician (1929–2024)

National Hero of Armenia Nikolai Ryzhkov
- Николай Рыжков
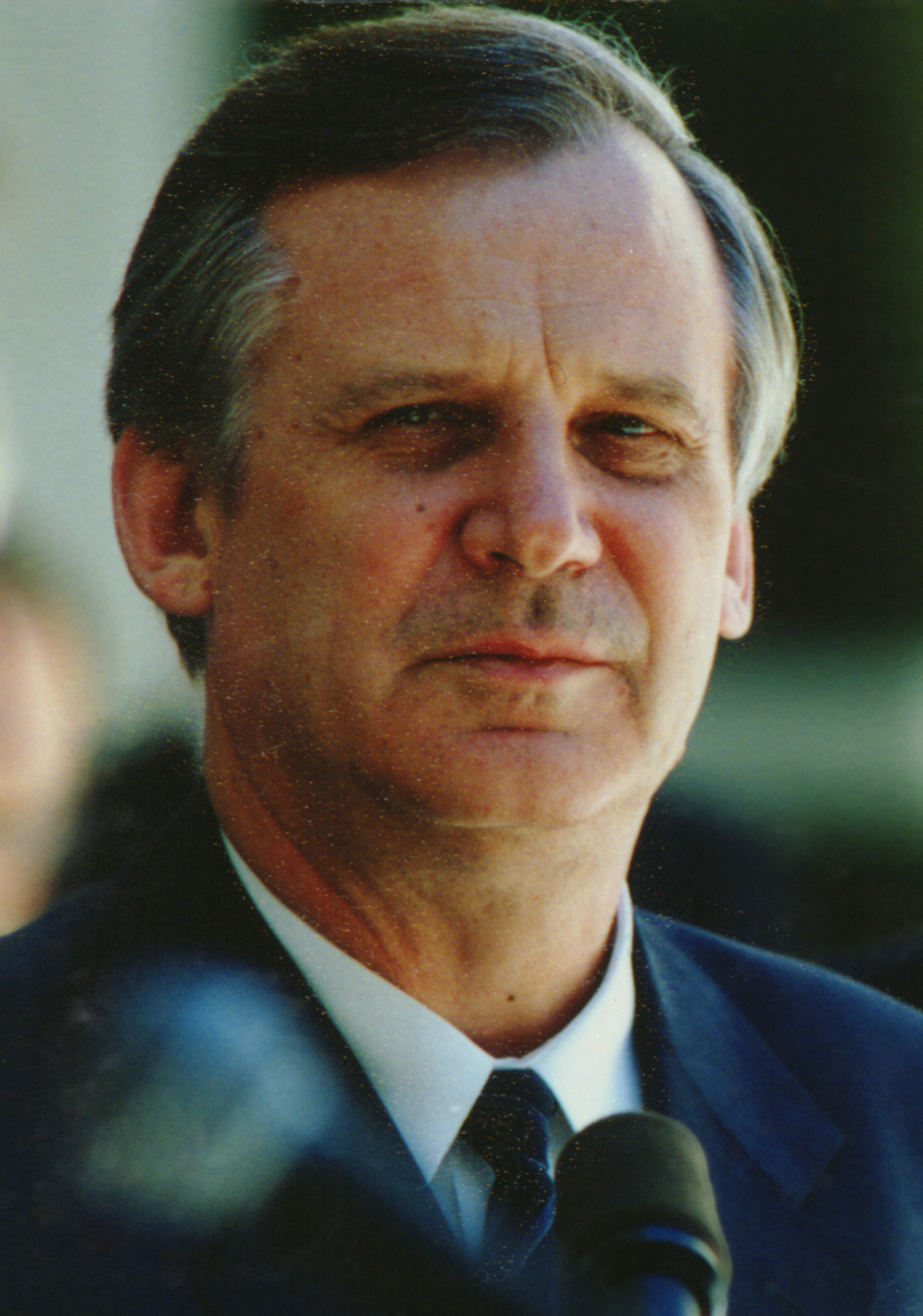
- Ryzhkov in 1990

Premier of the Soviet Union
- In office 27 September 1985 – 14 January 1991
- President: Andrei Gromyko; Mikhail Gorbachev
- First Deputies: See list: Ivan Arkhipov; Heydar Aliyev; Nikolai Talyzin; Vsevolod Murakhovsky; Yuri Maslyukov; Lev Voronin; Vladilen Nikitin
- Preceded by: Nikolai Tikhonov
- Succeeded by: Valentin Pavlov (as Prime Minister)

Senator from Belgorod Oblast
- In office 17 September 2003 – 25 September 2023
- Preceded by: Alexander Dondukov
- Succeeded by: Zhanna Chefranova

Member of the State Duma
- In office 17 January 1996 – 17 September 2003

Chairman of the Executive Committee of the People's Patriotic Union of Russia
- In office 7 August 1996 – 1998
- Preceded by: Post established
- Succeeded by: Viktor Zorkaltsev

Head of the Economic Department of the Central Committee of the Communist Party of the Soviet Union
- In office 1982 – August 1985
- Preceded by: Boris Gostev
- Succeeded by: Boris Gostev

Full member of the 26th, 27th Politburo
- In office 23 April 1985 – 13 July 1990

Member of the 25th Secretariat
- In office 22 November 1982 – 15 October 1985

Full member of the 26th, 27th, 28th of the Central Committee
- In office 3 March 1981 – 29 August 1991

Personal details
- Born: Nikolai Ivanovich Ryzhkov; 28 September 1929 Shcherbynivka, Ukrainian SSR, Soviet Union
- Died: 28 February 2024 (aged 94) Moscow, Russia
- Resting place: Troyekurovskoye Cemetery, Moscow
- Party: Independent (2003–2024)
- Other political affiliations: People's Patriotic Union of Russia (1996–2003); Communist Party of the Soviet Union (1956–1991)
- Spouse: Ludmila Ryzhkova
- Children: Marina

Nikolai Ivanovich Ryzhkov (Russian: Николай Иванович Рыжков; Ukrainian: Микола Іванович Рижков; 28 September 1929 – 28 February 2024) was a Russian politician. He served as the last chairman of the Council of Ministers of the Soviet Union from 1985 to 1991 and was succeeded by Valentin Pavlov as prime minister. The same year, he lost his seat on the Presidential Council, going on to become Boris Yeltsin's leading opponent in the 1991 presidential election of the Russian Soviet Federative Socialist Republic. He was the last surviving premier of the Soviet Union following the death of Ivan Silayev on 8 February 2023.

Ryzhkov was born in the town of Shcherbynivka, Ukrainian SSR (now Toretsk) in 1920. After graduating in 1959, he worked first in local industry before being moved into government in the 1970s, working his way up through the hierarchy of Soviet industrial ministries. He was appointed First Deputy Chairman of the State Planning Committee in 1979. Following Nikolai Tikhonov's resignation as Chairman of the Council of Ministers, Ryzhkov was voted into office in his place. During his tenure he supported Mikhail Gorbachev's 1980s reform of the Soviet economy.

Elected to the State Duma of the Russian Federation in December 1995 as an independent, Ryzhkov subsequently led the Power to the People voting bloc, later becoming the formal leader of the People's Patriotic Union of Russia alongside Gennady Zyuganov, who was an unofficial leader. On 17 September 2003, he resigned his seat in the Duma and became a member of the Federation Council representing Belgorod Oblast, which he held until he retired in 2023.

== Early life and career ==
Nikolai Ivanovich Ryzhkov was born to Russian parents on 28 September 1929, in Dzerzhynsk, Ukrainian Soviet Socialist Republic, Soviet Union. He graduated from the Ural Polytechnic Institute in 1959. A technocrat, he started work as a welder, proceeded through the ranks at the Sverdlovsk Uralmash Plant to become chief engineer, then became between 1970 and 1975 Factory Director of the Uralmash Production Amalgamation. Ryzhkov joined the Communist Party of the Soviet Union (CPSU) in 1956. He was transferred to Moscow in 1975 and appointed to the post of First Deputy Minister of the Ministry of Heavy and Transport Machine Building. Ryzhkov became First Deputy Chairman of the State Planning Committee in 1979 and was elected to the CPSU Central Committee in 1981. He was one of several members of the Soviet leadership affiliated to the "Andrei Kirilenko faction".

Yuri Andropov appointed Ryzhkov head of the Economic Department of the Central Committee where he was responsible for overseeing major planning and financial organs, excluding industry. As head of the department, he reported directly to Mikhail Gorbachev and as head of the Central Committee's Economic Department he met with Andropov once a week. Ryzhkov became convinced that had Andropov lived at least another five years, the Soviet Union would have seen a reform package similar to that implemented in the People's Republic of China. During Konstantin Chernenko's short rule, both Ryzhkov and Gorbachev elaborated several reform measures, sometimes in the face of opposition from Chernenko.

When Gorbachev came to power, Nikolai Tikhonov, the Chairman of the Council of Ministers, was elected Chairman of the newly established Commission on Improvements to the Management System. His title of chairman was largely honorary, with Ryzhkov the de facto head through his position as deputy chairman. Along with Yegor Ligachev, Ryzhkov became a full rather than a candidate member of the Politburo on 23 April 1985 during Gorbachev's tenure as General Secretary. Ryzhkov succeeded Tikhonov on 27 September 1985.

== Premiership ==
=== Political events ===
Following the Chernobyl disaster, along with Yegor Ligachev, Ryzhkov visited the crippled plant between 2–3 May 1986. On Ryzhkov's orders the government evacuated everyone within a 30 kilometres (19 mi) radius of the plant. The 30 km radius was a purely random guess and it was later shown that several areas contaminated with radioactive material were left untouched by government evacuation agencies.

In the aftermath of the 1988 earthquake in the Armenian Soviet Socialist Republic, Ryzhkov promised to rebuild the city of Spitak within two years. A Politburo commission was established to provide guidance for the local ASSR Government with Ryzhkov elected its chairman. The commission then travelled to the ASSR to assess damage caused by the earthquake. During Gorbachev's subsequent visit to the ASSR, and aware of local feelings following the disaster, Ryzhkov persuaded the less sensitive Gorbachev to forgo use of his limousine in favor of public transport. When Gorbachev left the ASSR, Ryzhkov remained to coordinate the rescue operation and made several television appearances which increased his standing amongst the Soviet leadership and the people in general. With his standing thus boosted, on 19 July 1988, at the Central Committee Plenum, Ryzhkov criticised nearly every one of Gorbachev's policies, further complaining that as Party Secretary he should devote more time to the Party. In the end, Ryzhkov failed in his promise to rebuild Spitak, partly due to the Soviet Union's mounting economic problems, and partly because many of the city's Soviet-era buildings had not been designed with adequate earthquake protection, making their reconstruction more difficult.

=== Economic policy ===
Historian Jerry F. Hough notes that Gorbachev treated Ryzhkov and his reform attempts just as badly as Leonid Brezhnev treated Alexei Kosygin, one-time Chairman of the Council of Ministers, during the Brezhnev era. Brezhnev's most notable snub was over the 1965 Soviet economic reform.

Ryzhkov was an early supporter of the Gorbachev policy calling for an increase in the quantity and quality of goods planned for production during the period of the Twelfth Five-Year Plan (1986–1990). To achieve these goals, the government pumped money into the machine-building sector but as time went by, Gorbachev increasingly diverged from his original stance. He now wanted to increase overall investment in nearly all industrial sectors; a move which Ryzhkov knew was a budgetary impossibility. However, Ryzhkov's economic policies were not much better as he continued to advocate an unreasonable increase in the production of consumer goods. Gorbachev and Ligachev's anti-alcohol campaign was opposed by Ryzhkov, who agreed with the State Planning Committee and the Ministry of Trade that such a drive would deprive from the state billions of roubles in income. Nevertheless, the campaign went ahead, losing the Soviet Government millions in revenues. Ryzhkov's opposition to the campaign was strengthened by his belief that both Gorbachev and Ligachev placed ideology before practical considerations, and he instead advocated an alternative long-term program rather than one designed to have immediate effect.

Ryzhkov and Gorbachev continued their work on economic reform and in 1987, began drafting the Law on the State Enterprise, which restricted the authority of central planners. This would later come into effect and give workers an unrealistically high level of power. Nikolai Talyzin, Chairman of the State Planning Committee, became the scapegoat for the failure of this reform and on the orders of Ryzhkov he was replaced by Yuri Maslyukov.

While supporting the transition away from a planned economy, Ryzhkov understood that privatisation would weaken the government's power. As changes occurred, skepticism over perestroika and privatisation was not limited to high-level government officialdom. Several middle and low-ranking officials, who owed their rise in the hierarchy to government-owned enterprises, wanted to retain the existing system. Gorbachev also blamed Ryzhkov and the Council of Ministers for the economic difficulties which arose during perestroika, a move which fostered resentment for both Gorbachev and perestroika. Nevertheless, in 1986, Ryzhkov stated that he, along with the rest of the Soviet leadership, were already discussing the possibility of creating a market economy in the Soviet Union. Ryzhkov supported the creation of a "regulated market economy" where the government sector occupied the "commanding heights" of the economy as well as the creation of semi-private-public companies. His second cabinet, several high-standing members of the KGB and the military establishment all supported Ryzhkov's opposition to the 500 Days Programme, which espoused a quick transition to a market economy. Matters did not improve when at the second session of the Congress of People's Deputies of the Soviet Union, Ryzhkov proposed postponing the transition to a market economy until 1992, further suggesting that in the period between 1990–1992, recentralisation of government activities would ensure a period of stabilisation.

Ryzhkov's economic reform plan was a hybrid of Leonid Abalkin's and one created by himself in conjunction with the Maslyukov chaired State Planning Committee along with several other government institutions. On 5 July 1989, the State Commission of the Council of Ministers on Economic Reforms was established, which replaced Maslyukov's reform commission. The new commission was chaired by Abalkin, who had also been appointed Deputy Chairman of the Council of Ministers.

With strong support from Ryzhkov, Gorbachev abolished the Central Committee economic department, thereby strengthening the authority of central government over economic matters. From then on, the government could not be blamed for economic policies initiated by the Party leadership. The establishment of the post of President of the Soviet Union by Gorbachev in 1990 weakened the power of the government apparatus; a move Ryzhkov and his second cabinet opposed.

=== Price reform ===
According to Swedish economist Anders Åslund, Ryzhkov differed little from Gorbachev when it came to price reform. There were, however, subtle differences between the two men's views, with Ryzhkov supporting an administratively controlled price increase while Gorbachev, as a radical economist who supported market reform, opposed such measures. As Hough noted, Ryzhkov supported "the need for greater fiscal responsibility", while Gorbachev advocated the need for more rational prices which, according to Hough, would have brought inflation under control. Ryzhkov proposed price reform measures to Gorbachev several times but was turned down on each occasions, even though Gorbachev had argued strongly on the need for price reform in his speeches. Gorbachev strengthened his public image by accusing the Soviet leadership's conservative faction together with Ryzhkov, of delaying implementation of the necessary price reform. Ryzhkov had the backing of several high-standing institutions, such as the Ministry of Finance and the State Committee on Prices, chaired by the future Soviet Premier Valentin Pavlov. In contrast to Gorbachev, Ryzhkov actually had, according to Hough, a plan for a transition to a market economy. Gorbachev on the other hand was never able to turn words into deeds.

By 1988, Ryzhkov increasingly sided with Leonid Abalkin, one of the few economists who advocated fiscal responsibility. At the 19th Conference of the Central Committee, Abalkin was severely criticised by Gorbachev, and accused of "economic determinism". Several conference delegates agreed with Gorbachev, but Ryzhkov's support remained solid. Abalkin was ordered to deliver a report to the Presidium of the Council of Ministers by December, which as things turned out, put financial stability at the top of its agenda. Gorbachev disliked Abalkin's report and rejected Ryzhkov's requests that he support it. Ryzhkov was then forced to create an even more conservative reform plan for 1989 in which price reform was to be postponed until 1991. When the Abalkin report was proposed at the Central Committee plenum, the majority of delegates indirectly attacked Gorbachev for his indecisiveness when it came to the implementation of price reform. In April 1990, after submitting a draft to the Presidential Council and the Federation Council, Ryzhkov's price reform was initiated. However, a short while later it was once more put on hold following severe criticism from Boris Yeltsin and several pro-Gorbachev intellectuals. The economic turmoil which hit the Soviet Union in 1990 was blamed on Ryzhkov, even though it was Gorbachev who had delayed Ryzhkov's proposed reform.

In his memoirs, Gorbachev vaguely asserts that a single price increase would be better than several. Things did not improve for Ryzhkov when, at the 28th Party Congress, Gorbachev claimed it would be "absurd" to begin serious economic reform with price increases.

=== Fall from power ===
In August 1990, several leading officials tried to persuade Gorbachev to force Ryzhkov to resign from his post. Gorbachev did not bow to this pressure, fearing that Ryzhkov's removal would lead to increased activity by many of his pro-republican first secretaries and Politburo members. Ryzhkov's numerous supporters were not concerned about policy issues; they backed him simply because he opposed some of Gorbachev's economic and political reforms. In July 1990, as the Politburo underwent restructuring at the 28th Party Congress, all government officials except Gorbachev and Vladimir Ivashko, the Deputy General Secretary, were excluded with Ryzhkov losing his Politburo seat by default. Nevertheless, Ryzhkov, along with many others, was elected a member of the Presidential Council. On 19 October 1990, the Russian Supreme Soviet, by a vote of 164 to 1 with 16 abstentions, forced the resignation of Ryzhkov and his cabinet and the implementation of the 500 Days Programme. In stark contrast, Supreme Soviet of the Soviet Union support for Ryzhkov's economic reform plan increased. Ryzhkov's economic reform plan was passed by an overwhelming majority, with 1,532 deputies in favour, 419 against and 44 deputies abstaining. The parliamentary Interregional Group's vote of no confidence in Ryzhkov's government also failed, with 199 members in favour of Ryzhkov and his cabinet's resignation, 1,685 against and 99 abstaining. As the result of a propaganda war launched against Ryzhkov by Gorbachev supporters, several leading members of the Council of Ministers and its Presidium urged Ryzhkov to resign so that the Soviet Government could reach a compromise with the Russian Government. To make matters worse, the Russian Government which was headed by Ivan Silayev, stopped following Ryzhkov's orders, and Silayev refused to visit the Moscow Kremlin.

Ryzhkov's Plan and the 500 Days Programme were broadly similar, with both supporting price liberalisation, decentralisation and privatisation. The main difference between the two was Ryzhkov's desire to retain much of the social security system, free education for all and the continuance of a strong central government apparatus. The 500 Days Programme did not mention political union with the other Soviet republics, but instead weakened the authority of the central government by establishing a market economy. In other words, they left the question of continuing or dissolving the Soviet Union open. On 17 September, in a meeting of the Supreme Soviet of the Soviet Union, Gorbachev openly supported the 500 Days Programme, claiming it would not lead to the reestablishment of capitalism, but instead to a mixed economy where private enterprise played an important role.

In December 1990, Ryzhkov suffered a heart attack. During his recovery, the Supreme Soviet of the Soviet Union dissolved the Council of Ministers and replaced it with the Cabinet of Ministers headed by Valentin Pavlov, Ryzhkov's former Minister of Finance. The law enacting the change was passed on 26 December 1990, but the new structure was not implemented until 14 January 1991 when Pavlov took over as Prime Minister of the Soviet Union. Between Ryzhkov's hospitalisation and Pavlov's election as prime minister, Lev Voronin acted as the Chairman of the Council of Ministers. The reorganisation of the government made it subordinate to the Presidency, weakening the head of government's hold on economic policy. In contrast to Hough's view that Gorbachev had little reason to remove Ryzhkov, Gordon M. Hahn argues that there were good reasons to replace him given that with Ryzhkov's Politburo support much reduced, the reformist opposition saw him as a conservative.

== 1991 presidential campaign ==
1991 election. Blue indicates where Yeltsin received the most votes, red indicates where Ryzhkov received the most votes, grey indicates where Tuleyev won the most votes.

After recovering from his heart attack in early 1991, Ryzhkov stood as the Communist candidate in the first election of the President of the Russian Soviet Federative Socialist Republic (RSFSR). Ryzhkov's vice presidential candidate was Boris Gromov, a Soviet war veteran who led the Soviet military during the final stages of the war in Afghanistan. Running as the Communist Party nominee, Ryzhkov placed second in the election. He received a total of 13,395,335 votes, equal to 16.9% of the total vote. He placed more than forty points behind Boris Yeltsin, who won the election.

== Post-Soviet Russia ==
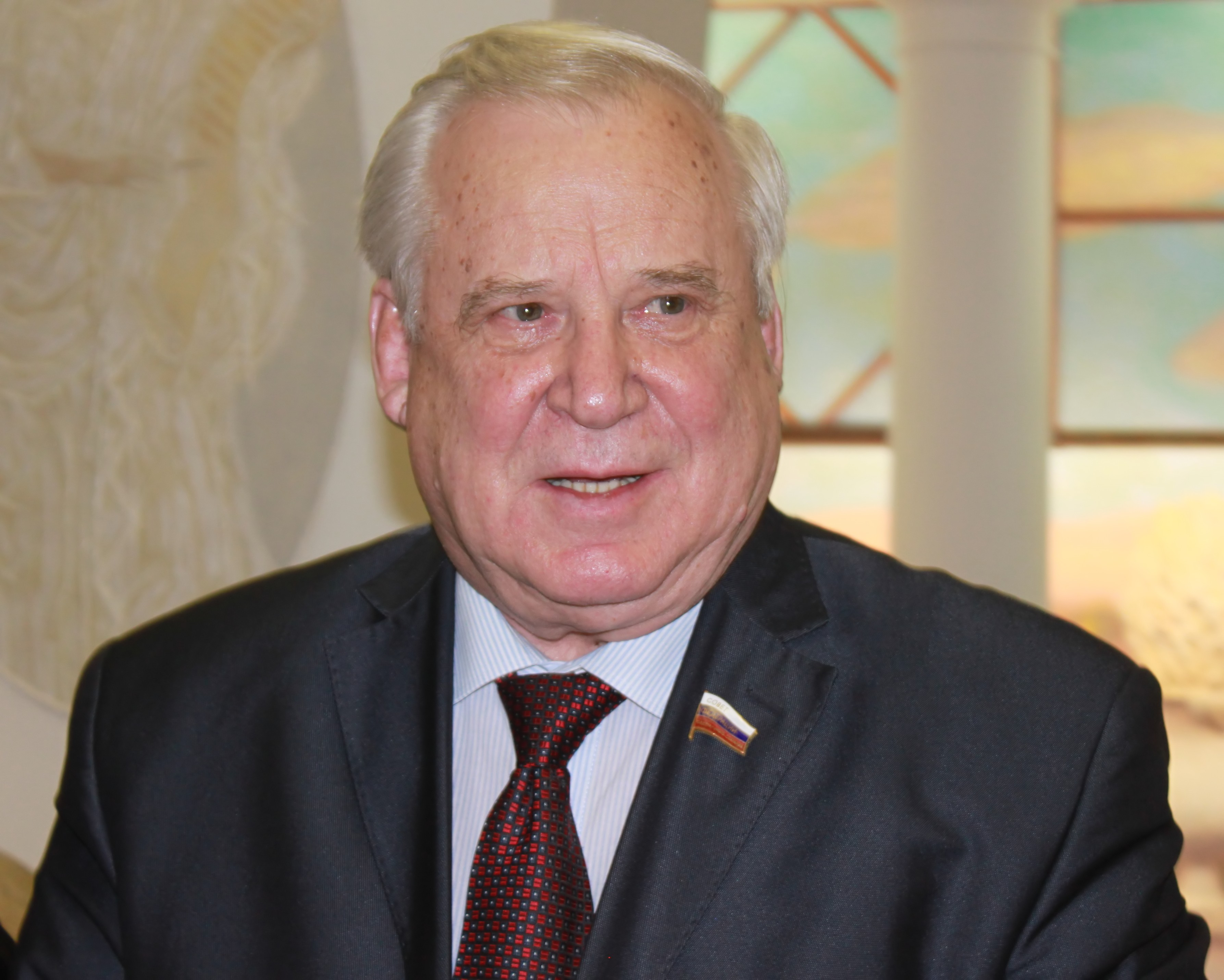
Ryzhkov on 27 November 2009

During the 1995 legislative campaign, Ryzhkov defended his own tenure as Chairman of the Soviet Council of Ministers, claiming that Russians were far worse off under capitalism than Soviet communism. Russian TV channel NTV broadcast a debate featuring only Ryzhkov and Grigory Yavlinsky, a liberal politician who strongly supported economic reforms. At the election, he was elected to the State Duma Federal Assembly as an independent candidate. Once elected, he headed the Power to the People! bloc, a communist faction with nationalist tendencies. The Power to the People bloc came about through the merger of Ryzhkov's supporters and the All-People's Union headed by Sergey Baburin. Its policies were left-wing and included revival of the Soviet Union, the introduction of a planned economy, more state involvement in the economy and the promotion of nationalism and patriotism. In the Second State Duma "Power to the People!" sided with another national-patriotic forces in Narodovlastie faction, also led by Ryzhkov. During the 1996 presidential election, Ryzhkov endorsed Gennady Zyuganov, the Communist Party of the Russian Federation (CPRF) candidate, for the presidency.

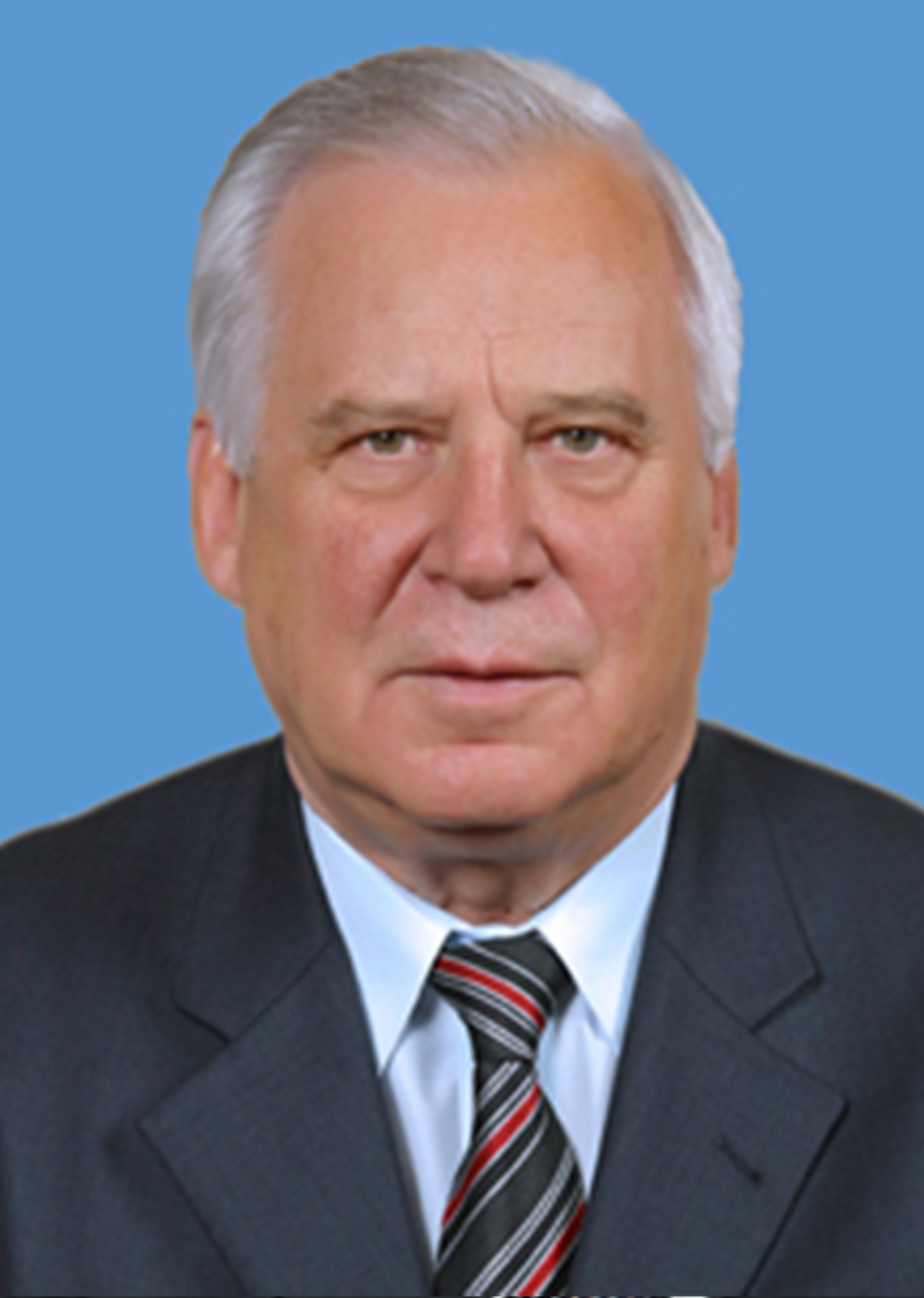
Official portrait as Senator in 2016

In 1996, Ryzhkov was one of the founders of the CPRF-led alliance of leftists and nationalists known as the People's Patriotic Union of Russia (NPSR) and was elected chairman of its Duma faction. The NPSR's formal leaders were Ryzhkov and Zyuganov, who was an unofficial leader. In September 2003, Ryzhkov entered the Federation Council of the Federal Assembly of the Russian Federation as the representative for Belgorod Oblast, subsequently resigning his seat in the State Duma. He served as Chairman of the Federation Council Commission on Natural Monopolies, as a member of the Committee on Local Self-Governance and as co-chairman of the Russian–Armenian commission on inter-parliamentary cooperation. Ryzhkov resigned as a member of the Federation Council on 25 September 2023.

In 2014, Ryzhkov supported the introduction of Russian troops into Ukraine, and in 2022, he expressed his support for the annexation of four regions from Ukraine during the Russian invasion of Ukraine.

Ryzkhov died in Moscow on 28 February 2024, at the age of 94. He was buried at the Troyekurovskoye Cemetery.

== Sanctions ==
In March 2014, following the Crimean status referendum, the U.S. Treasury put Ryzhkov on the Specially Designated Nationals List (SDN), a list of individuals sanctioned as "members of the Russian leadership's inner circle." The sanctions freeze any assets he held in the US and banned him from entering the United States. On 17 March 2014, Ryzhkov was added to the European Union sanctions list due to his role in the annexation of Crimea by the Russian Federation. He was barred from entering EU countries, and his assets in the EU were frozen.

== Awards, decorations, and orders ==
Ryzhkov was awarded the Order of the Red Banner of Labour twice, in 1966 and 1985, the Order of the October Revolution in 1971, the Order of Lenin in 1976 and 1979 and the Order of Merit for the Fatherland, 4th class (27 September 2004 – for outstanding contribution to the strengthening of the Russian state and many years of diligent work). A monument in recognition of his significant personal contribution to the reconstruction in Armenia after the 1988 Spitak earthquake was erected by the Armenian Government. In 2008, the Armenian Government awarded Ryzhkov their highest state decoration, the National Hero of Armenia. The Ukrainian Government awarded him the Order of Prince Yaroslav the Wise, 5th class, "for his outstanding contribution to the development of Russian–Ukrainian cooperation and on the occasion of his 75th birthday" on 24 September 2004. The Russian President awarded Ryzhkov the Diploma of the President on 3 October 2009.

Other decorations awarded to Ryzhkov include:

- Hero of Labour of the Russian Federation (2019)
- Order of the Patriotic War, 1st class (1985)
- Medal "In Commemoration of the 850th Anniversary of Moscow" (1997)
- Medal "In Commemoration of the 1000th Anniversary of Kazan" (2005)
- Jubilee Medal "In Commemoration of the 100th Anniversary since the Birth of Vladimir Il'ich Lenin" (1970)
- Order "Danaker" (Kyrgyzstan)
- Order of Holy Prince Daniel of Moscow, 2nd class
- State Prize of the USSR
  - 1969 – for the creation and implementation of complex mechanized welding demonstration in a unique block of welded structures URALMASHZAVOD engineering (with the team)
  - 1979 – for the creation and implementation of high-slab continuous casting machines for steel curved type complexes of high power (with the team)

== Bibliography ==
- Bialer, Seweryn (1986). The Soviet Paradox: External Expansion, Internal Decline. I.B.Tauris. ISBN 978-1-85043-030-8.
- Belin, Laura; Orttung, Robert (1997). The Russian Parliamentary Elections of 1995: The Battle for the Duma. M.E. Sharpe. ISBN 978-0-7656-0084-4.
- Gill, Graeme; Markwick, Roger (2000). Russia's Stillborn Democracy?: From Gorbachev to Yeltsin. Oxford University Press. ISBN 978-0-19-924041-8.
- Hahn, Gordon (2002). Russia's Revolution from Above, 1985–2000: Reform, Transition, and Revolution in the Fall of the Soviet Communist Regime. Transaction Publishers. ISBN 978-0-7658-0049-7.
- Hough, Jerry (1997). Democratization and Revolution in the USSR, 1985–1991. Brookings Institution Press. ISBN 978-0-8157-3748-3.
- Hough, Jerry; Davidheiser, Evelyn; Lehmann, Susan (1996). The 1996 Russian Presidential Election. Brookings Institution Press. ISBN 978-0-8157-3751-3.
- Service, Robert (2009). History of Modern Russia: From Tsarism to the Twenty-first Century. Penguin Books Ltd. ISBN 978-0-14-103797-4.
- Åslund, Anders (1992). Market Socialism or the Restoration of Capitalism?. Cambridge University Press. ISBN 978-0-521-41193-6.
- Ostrovsky, Alexander (2010). Кто поставил Горбачёва? (Who put Gorbachev?) — М.: Алгоритм-Эксмо, 2010. — 544 с. ISBN 978-5-699-40627-2.
- Ostrovsky, Alexander (2011). Глупость или измена? Расследование гибели СССР. (Stupidity or treason? Investigation of the death of the USSR) М.: Форум, Крымский мост-9Д, 2011. — 864 с. ISBN 978-5-89747-068-6.

Political offices
| Preceded by Nikolai Tikhonov | Premier of the Soviet Union; 27 September 1985 – 14 January 1991 | Succeeded by Valentin Pavlov |
