= 19th All-Union Conference of the Communist Party of the Soviet Union =

1988 Soviet Union Communist Party conference

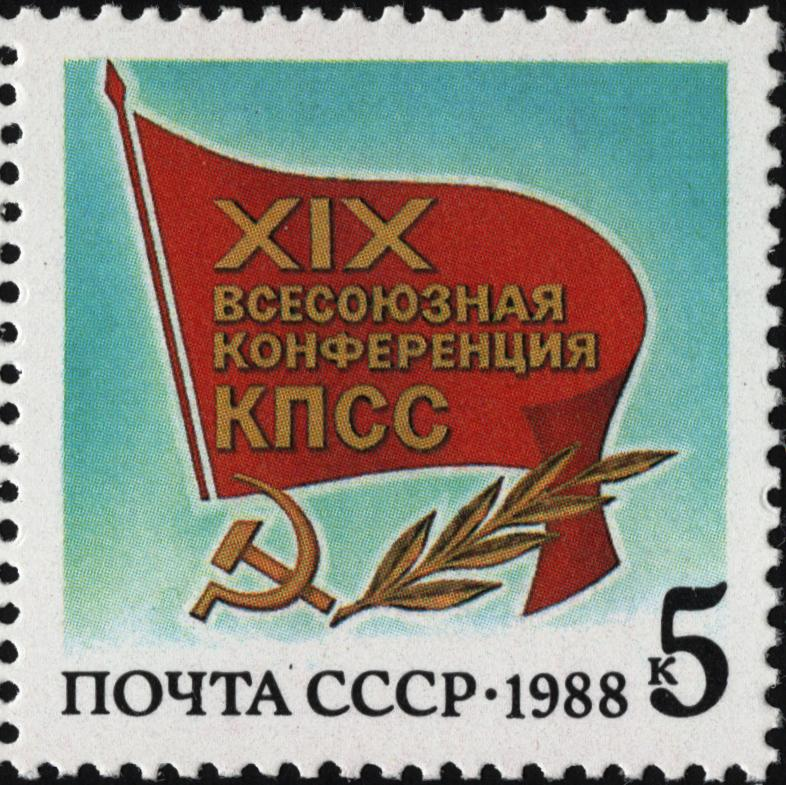

The 19th All-Union Conference of the Communist Party of the Soviet Union was a party conference held by the Communist Party of the Soviet Union from 28 June to 1 July 1988. The conference was attended by 4,991 delegates.

== The conference ==
The General Secretary, Mikhail Gorbachev, declared in his opening speech that political reform was the key issue. Gorbachev wanted to achieve the "democratization of the life of the state and society", and wanted the Soviet Union to "move along the path of the creation of a socialist state under the rule of law".

The Conference called for elections for the governmental soviets at all levels, with secret ballots and multiple candidacies, and it established the Congress of People's Deputies of the Soviet Union.

Although Gorbachev had to compromise on some of his several objectives because of conservative resistance, the conference was a significant victory for Gorbachev.
