= Congress of People's Deputies of the Soviet Union =

Government body in the Soviet Union

Congress of People's Deputies of the Soviet Union Съезд народных депутатов СССР

Type
- Type: Unicameral

History
- Established: 25 May 1989; 37 years ago
- Disbanded: 5 September 1991; 34 years ago
- Preceded by: Supreme Soviet of the Soviet Union
- Succeeded by: State Council of the Soviet Union

Structure
- Seats: 2,250
- Political groups: Communist Party of the Soviet Union (1,958); Independents (292)

Elections
- Voting system: Direct election
- Last election: 26 March 1989

Meeting place
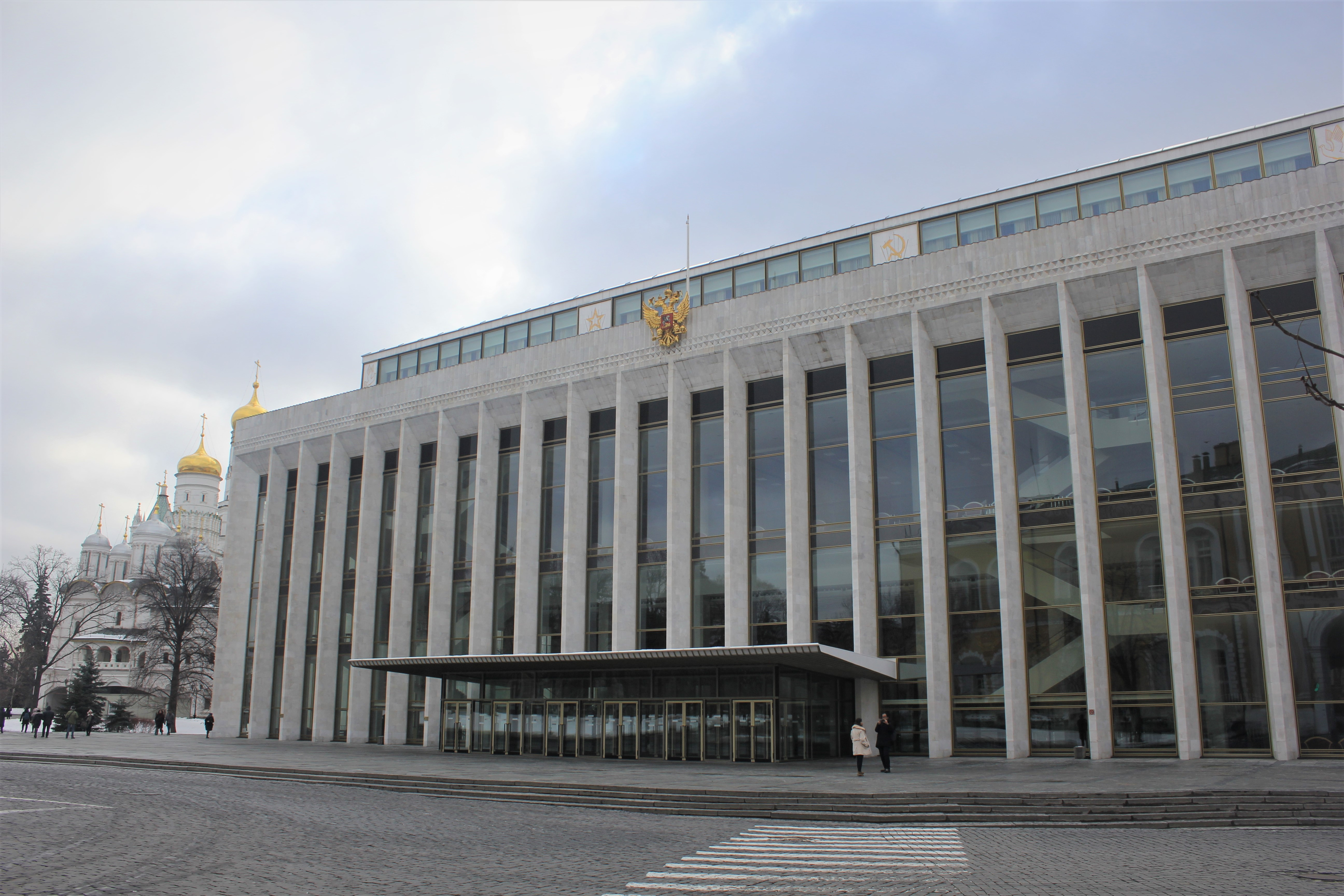
- Kremlin Palace of Congresses, Moscow Kremlin

The Congress of People's Deputies of the Soviet Union (Note: Russian: Съезд народных депутатов СССР, romanized: Sjezd narodnyh deputatov SSSR) was the highest body of state authority of the Soviet Union from 1989 to 1991.

== Background ==
The Congress of People's Deputies of the Soviet Union was created as part of Mikhail Gorbachev's reform agenda, and was enabled by Gorbachev's first constitutional change.

On 1 July 1988, the fourth and last day of the 19th Party Conference, Gorbachev won the backing of the delegates for his last minute proposal to create a new supreme legislative body called the Congress of People's Deputies of the Soviet Union. Frustrated by the old guard's resistance to his attempts to liberalise, Gorbachev changed tack and embarked upon a set of amendments to the 1977 Constitution to try to separate party and state, and thereby isolate his conservative opponents. Detailed proposals for the new Congress of People's Deputies of the Soviet Union were published for public consultation on 2 October 1988, and to enable the creation of the new legislature the Supreme Soviet, during its 29 November to 1 December 1988 session, implemented the amendments to the 1977 Soviet Constitution, enacted a law on electoral reform, and set the date of the election for 26 March 1989.

This new Congress was to be de facto successor to the Leninist era Congress of Soviets of the Soviet Union, established in 1922 and dissolved in 1936.

== Composition ==
The Congress consisted of 2,250 deputies elected in three different ways:

- 750 deputies were elected according to the system used in Soviet of the Union elections in the 1936–1989 period.
- 750 deputies were elected according to the system used in Soviet of Nationalities elections in the 1936–1989 period.
- 750 deputies representing "public organizations", such as the Communist Party, Komsomol and the trade unions. The election law would allocate a fixed number of seats to organizations.

The congress would gather twice a year and would then elect the reformed Supreme Soviet of the Soviet Union consisting of a smaller number of deputies (542 in the new Supreme soviet compared to the 1,500 in the old supreme soviet). The Supreme Soviet would then serve as a permanent legislature, deciding all but the most important issues, such as amendments to the Soviet constitution, which were left to the full Congress only.

The congress's powers were: Amending the Soviet constitution, electing the Supreme Soviet, repealing acts by the Supreme Soviet, electing the Supreme Soviet chairman (speaker), ratifying the Chairman of the Council of Ministers, holding nationwide referendums, resolving issues related to the national-republic structure of the union, defining the national borders and ratifying border changes between republics, defining the basic guidelines of foreign and domestic policy, ratifying long term social and economic plans and other national affairs.

== Electoral process ==
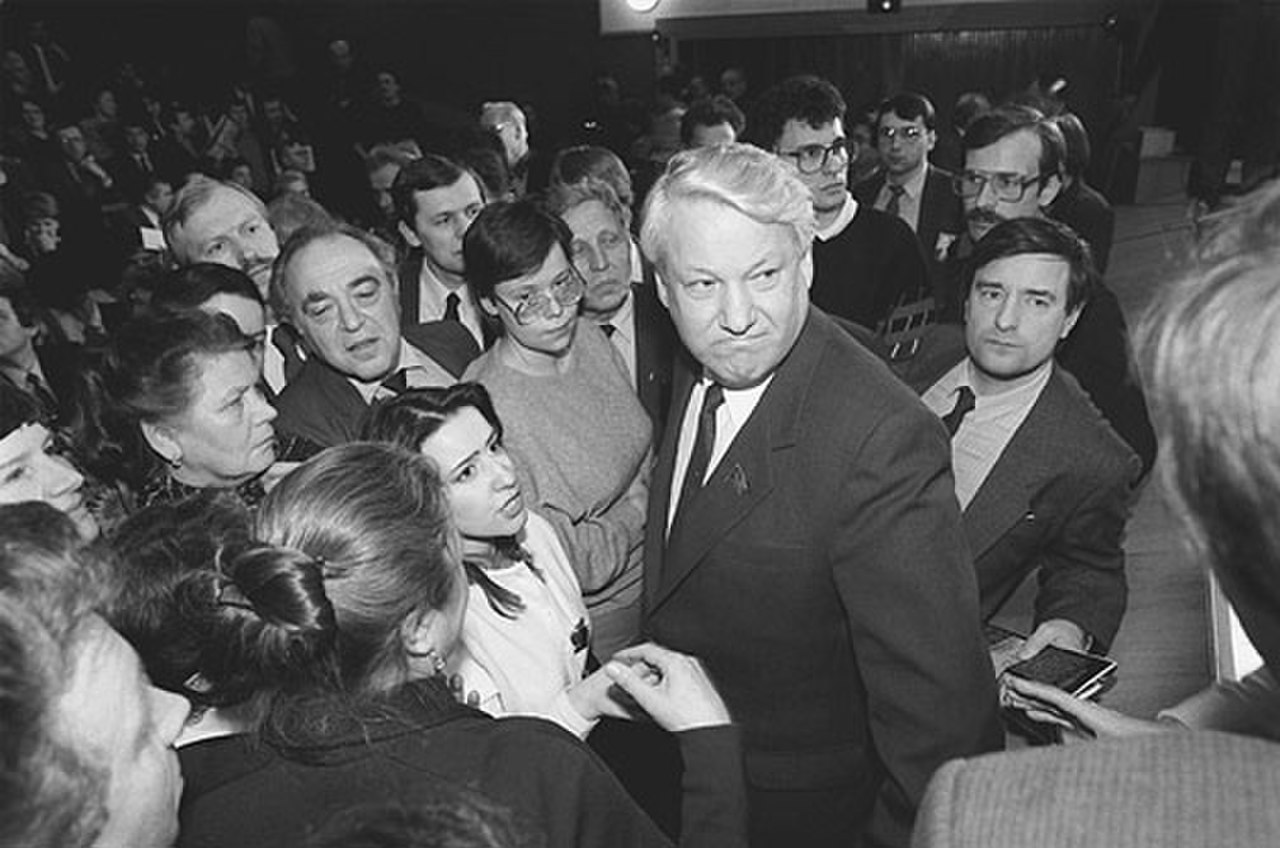
Boris Yeltsin during his electoral campaign on 1 February 1989.

The month-long nomination of candidates for the Congress of People's Deputies of the USSR (CPD) lasted until 24 January 1989. For the next month, selection among the 7,531 districts nominees took place at meetings organized by constituency-level electoral commissions. On 7 March, a final list of 5,074 candidates (one in 399 constituencies, two in 953 constituencies and three or more in 163 constituencies) was published; approximately 85% of these were members of the ruling Communist Party of the Soviet Union (CPSU) and 17% were women.

In the two weeks prior to the 1,500 districts polls, elections to fill 750 reserved seats of public organizations, contested by 880 candidates, were held. Of these seats, 100 were allocated to the CPSU, 100 to the All-Union Central Council of Trade Unions, 75 to the Communist Youth Union (Komsomol), 75 to the Soviet Women's Committee, 75 to the All-Union War and Labour Veterans' Organization, and 325 to other organizations such as the Academy of Sciences. The selection process was ultimately completed in April.

In the 26 March general elections, voter participation was reported at 89.8%. With this polling, 1,958 – including 1,225 district seats – of the 2,250 CPD seats were filled. In the district races, run-off elections were held in 76 constituencies on 2 and 9 April and fresh elections were organized on 20 April and 14 to 23 May in the 199 remaining constituencies where the required absolute majority was not attained.

== Congress sessions ==
An election was held for the Congress on 26 March 1989. Afterwards the Congress held four sessions:

- 1st session: 25 May – 9 June 1989.
- 2nd session: 12 December – 24 December 1989.
- 3rd session: 12 March – 20 March 1990.
- Fourth and final session: 5 September 1991.

At its first session, deputies used their freedom of speech to criticise the state of the Soviet Union. Radicals and conservatives made speech after speech, at the first session, televised live and watched by millions of people. So many people watched it that industrial output declined, as everyone was glued to their screens. At its first session commencing on 25 May, the CPD proceeded to choose the 542 Supreme Soviet members from among 573 candidates. Final results were announced on 27 May. The Supreme Soviet, a "permanent legislative, administrative and central body of state authority of the USSR", was to be convened annually by its Presidium for its recurrent spring and autumn sessions to last, as a rule, three to four months each.

The Supreme Soviet was convened for its first session on 3 June. On 21 July, the composition of the new Council of Ministers, headed by Nikolai Ryzhkov, was announced.

Only one Congress was elected, in March 1989. The fundamental difference from previous elections in Soviet Union was that elections were actually competitive. Instead of one Communist Party-approved candidate for each seat, multiple candidates were allowed. A variety of different political positions, from Communist to pro-Western, were represented in the Congress, and lively debates took place with different viewpoints expressed.

As a result of the attempted coup in August 1991, the Congress dissolved itself on 5 September 1991, handing on its powers to the Supreme Soviet of the Soviet Union and newly created USSR State Council, which (Supreme Soviet and State Council) ceased to exist on 26 December 1991, along with the Soviet Union itself (1,606 for, 116 against, 83 abstaining, and 37 not voting).

== See also ==
- Congress of People's Deputies of Russia
- Congress of Soviets
