= Presidential Council of the Soviet Union =

Advisory body to the President of the Soviet Union

- Президентский совет СССР

Agency overview
- Formed: 14 March 1990
- Dissolved: 26 December 1990
- Superseding agency: Presidential Political-Consulatative Council of the USSR
- Jurisdiction: Union of Soviet Socialist Republics
- Headquarters: Moscow, Russian SFSR, USSR

The Presidential Council (Russian: Президентский совет СССР, romanized: Prezidentskiy sovet SSSR) was an advisory body to the President of the Soviet Union. It was created on 14 March 1990 to replace the Politburo as the major policymaking body in the USSR. According to article 127 in the Soviet constitution the job of the presidential council was "to implement the basic thrust of USSR's domestic and foreign policy and ensure the country's security", and to present the president policy alternative on social, economic, foreign and defence problems facing the nation, but it lacked a clear mission and had no policymaking authority, and its members were unable to work as a team. In late 1990, Gorbachev invited White House Chief of Staff John H. Sununu to Moscow to advice him on organising the presidential support staff. It was abolished on 26 December 1990. Only the writer Valentin Rasputin was a non-party member.

== Members ==
The members were as follows:

Name	Occupation
Chingiz Aitmatov	A Kyrgyz writer
Vadim Bakatin	Minister of Interior
Valery Boldin	Head of the Central Committee General Department
Nikolai Gubenko	Minister of Culture of the Soviet Union
Alberts Kauls	Chairman of the Ādaži agricultural company (Latvian)
Vadim Medvedev	Secretary for Ideology of CPSU Central Committee
Yury Maslyukov	Chairman of the State Planning Committee
Yury Osipian	Physicist and Vice Chairman of the USSR Academy of Sciences
Yevgeny Primakov	Chairman of the USSR Soviet of the Union
Valentin Rasputin	A ruralist writer
Grigory Revenko	The head of the president's staff (Ukrainian)
Alexander Yakovlev	A senior secretary of the Communist Party of the Soviet Union
Nikolai Ryzhkov	Chairman of the Council of Ministers
Stanislav Shatalin	Economist
Eduard Shevardnadze	Foreign Minister of the Soviet Union (Georgian)
Gennady Yanayev	Vice President of the Soviet Union
Veniamin Yarin	Chairman of the Russian United Labour Front
Dmitry Yazov	Marshal and Minister of Defence of Soviet Union
