= State Council of the Soviet Union =

1991 executive body in the Eurasian state

State Council of the USSR
- Государственный Совет СССР

Agency overview
- Formed: 5 September 1991
- Preceding agency: Federation Council of the Soviet Union
- Dissolved: 26 December 1991
- Superseding agency: Council of Heads of State of the CIS
- Jurisdiction: Union of Soviet Socialist Republics
- Headquarters: Moscow, Russian SFSR, USSR

Following the August 1991 Soviet coup d'état attempt, the State Council of the Union of Soviet Socialist Republics (USSR) (Russian: Государственный Совет СССР), also known as the State Soviet (Russian: Госсовет, romanized: Gossovet), was formed on 5 September 1991 and was designed to be one of the most important government offices in Mikhail Gorbachev's Soviet Union. The members of the council consisted of the president of the Soviet Union, and highest officials (which typically was presidents of their republics) from the Soviet Union's republics. During the period of transition it was the highest organ of state power, having the power to elect a prime minister, or a person who would take Gorbachev's place if absent; the office of Vice President of the Soviet Union had been abolished following the failed August Coup that very same year.

== History ==
The idea of the institution of a State Council in the Soviet Union first appeared in the early 1970s, during the early days of Leonid Brezhnev's rule. As head of the CPSU, Brezhnev was the de facto leader of the Soviet Union, but was only ranked third in diplomatic protocol, eclipsed by the Chairman of the Presidium of the Supreme Soviet Nikolai Podgorny (head of state; first in protocol) and the Chairman of the Council of Ministers Alexei Kosygin (head of government; second in protocol). Brezhnev's supporters conceived the idea of establishing a State Council, similar to those of East Germany, Bulgaria, and Romania, to replace the Presidium of the Supreme Soviet as the highest organ of state; the State Council's chairmanship would be assumed by Brezhnev himself, allowing him to replace Podgorny as the head of state and first-ranked person in diplomatic protocol. These plans did not come to fruition: under the Brezhnev Constitution of 1977, the collegial Presidium of the Supreme Soviet was retained as the highest body of power in the country, rather than being replaced by a Council of State.

== Inter-republican Economic Committee ==
With the central government's authority greatly weakened by the failed coup, Gorbachev established a four-man committee, led by Russian SFSR Premier Ivan Silayev, that included Grigory Yavlinsky, Arkadi Volsky, and Yuri Luzhkov, to elect a new Cabinet of Ministers. This committee was later transformed into the Committee on the Operational Management of the Soviet Economy (COMSE), also chaired by Silayev, to manage the Soviet economy. On 28 August 1991 the Supreme Soviet temporarily gave the COMSE the same authority as the Cabinet of Ministers, and Silayev became the Soviet Union's de facto Prime Minister. Yet, COMSE was quickly surpassed in authority by the Inter-republican Economic Committee of the Soviet Union (IEC), also led by Silayev. Its function was to coordinate economic policy across the Soviet Union. As Chairman of both COMSE and the IEC, Silayev presided over a quickly disintegrating Soviet Union.

When he first took office, Silayev wanted to reduce the powers of the central government and give more powers to the Soviet Republics. This view changed; he demanded that Yeltsin give back much of the authority of the central government which he had usurped following the August Coup. In this he failed, and his position as Russian SFSR Premier was severely weakened as a result. Oleg Lobov, Silayev's First Deputy Premier, led the anti-Silayev faction in the Russian SFSR Council of Ministers and managed to oust him on 26 September 1991; Lobov succeeded Silayev as acting Premier of the Russian SFSR. Silayev, as overseer of the economy, was given the task of initiating economic reforms in the Soviet Union in a way that suited both the central government and the Soviet republics. Silayev tried to maintain an integrated economy while initiating the marketisation of the economy. Further disintegration of the USSR led to the transformation of the IEC into the Interstate Economic Committee of the Economic Community (coordinating relations between the union republics and republics, declaring their secession from the USSR). The IEC showed its international intent by signing the European Energy Charter on 16/17 December 1991 with 35 other countries, but this was undermined by the charter also being signed by nine of the twelve remaining republics.

== Dissolution of the Soviet Union ==
On 19 December COMSE was dissolved by a presidential Russian SFSR decree. Оn 25 December Gorbachev announced his resignation from the post of President of the USSR in connection with the creation of the Commonwealth of Independent States. Accordingly, the union government ceased to exist. The next day, 26 December 1991 the Soviet Union was formally dissolved by the Soviet of the Republics.

Political offices
Preceded by State Council (Russian Empire)	State Council of the Soviet Union; 5 September 1991-26 December 1991	Succeeded by State Council (Russia)
