= Konstantin Gorshenin =

Soviet statesman (1907-1978)

- Константин Горшенин
- Gorshenin in 1977

5th Prosecutor of the Soviet Union
- In office November 13, 1943 – March 19, 1946
- Preceded by: Victor Bochkov
- Succeeded by: Office abolished

1st Prosecutor General of the Soviet Union
- In office March 19, 1946 – February 4, 1948

2nd Minister of Justice of the Soviet Union
- In office January 29, 1948 – May 31, 1956
- Preceded by: Nikolay Rychkov
- Succeeded by: Office abolished (1956–1970); Vladimir Terebilov

2nd Chairman of the Legal Commission Under the Council of Ministers of the Soviet Union
- In office January 19, 1949 – August 1956
- Preceded by: Andrey Vyshinsky
- Succeeded by: Andrey Denisov

11th People's Commissar of Justice of the Russian Soviet Federative Socialist Republic
- In office January 26, 1940 – November 12, 1943
- Preceded by: Yakov Dmitriev
- Succeeded by: Ivan Basavin

Personal details
- Born: Konstantin Petrovich Gorshenin; June 10, 1907 Alatyr, Simbirsk Governorate, Russian Empire
- Died: May 27, 1978 (aged 70) Moscow, Soviet Union
- Party: Communist Party of the Soviet Union since 1930
- Education: Moscow Institute of Soviet Law
- Occupation: Faculty of law, moscow state university
- Portfolio: Doctor of Laws
- Awards: Order of Lenin; Order of the Red Banner of Labour; Order of Friendship of Peoples

Konstantin Petrovich Gorshenin (Russian: Константин Петрович Горшенин; 10 June 1907 – 27 May 1978) was a Soviet statesman. Candidate member of the Central Committee of the Communist Party of the Soviet Union (1952–1956). Deputy of the Supreme Soviet of the Soviet Union of the 2nd and 4th Convocations. Doctor of Law (1968), professor.

== Biography ==
Born in the city of Alatyr, Simbirsk Province.

- 1925–1927 – student of an industrial technical school, Kazan;
- 1927–1929 – Secretary of the Local Committee of the Trade Union of Railway Workers, Secretary of the Collective of the All–Union Leninist Communist Youth Union, Head of the Workers' Club, Secretary of the Village Council, Yudino Station of the Tatar Autonomous Soviet Socialist Republic;
- 1929–1930 – student of the Law Faculty of Kazan University;
- 1930–1932 – student at the Moscow Institute of Soviet Law. Graduated from the Moscow Institute of Soviet Law in 1932;
- 1932–1935 – graduate student of the same institute;
- 1935–1937 – Deputy Director of the Kazan Institute of Soviet Law for academic affairs;
- 1937–1940 – head of educational institutions and member of the board of the People's Commissariat of Justice of the Soviet Union;
- 1940–1943 – People's Commissar of Justice of the Russian Soviet Federative Socialist Republic;
- 1943–1948 – Prosecutor (Prosecutor General) of the Soviet Union;
- 1948–1956 – Minister of Justice of the Soviet Union.

He fought for control over the justice authorities with Anatoly Volin, Chairman of the Supreme Court of the Soviet Union.

- 1956–1963 – Director of the All–Union Institute of Legal Sciences;
- 1963–1967 – head of the sector of labor and social security legislation of the All–Union Scientific Research Institute of Soviet Legislation of the Legal Commission under the Council of Ministers of the Soviet Union;
- Since 1967, he has been a personal pensioner of union significance.

== Activity ==
Holding the posts of the Prosecutor General of the Soviet Union and the Minister of Justice of the Soviet Union, he participated in the repressions. In 1943–1947, he was a member of the secret commission of the Political Bureau of the Central Committee of the All–Union Communist Party (Bolsheviks) on judicial matters. The commission approved all death sentences in the Soviet Union.

Since 1948, he headed the Permanent Commission for Open Trials on the Most Important Cases of former servicemen of the German army and German punitive bodies, exposed of atrocities against Soviet citizens in the temporarily occupied territory of the Soviet Union. Took part in organizing trials of German and Japanese War Criminals.

In February 1954, he prepared a certificate in the name of Nikita Khrushchev about those convicted by the Collegium of the United State Political Administration, the People's Commissariat of Internal Affairs, a Special Meeting, the Military Collegium, courts and military tribunals for counterrevolutionary crimes for the period from 1921 to February 1, 1954, which indicated the exact number those sentenced to capital punishment, exiled and serving sentences in camps and prisons; it also provided the geography of the prisoners' accommodation.

Gorshenin became one of the three initiators (along with Georgy Zhukov and Roman Rudenko) of the adoption of a joint resolution of the Central Committee of the Communist Party of the Soviet Union and the Council of Ministers of the Soviet Union of June 29, 1956 "On Eliminating the Consequences of Gross Violations of the Law in Relation to Former Prisoners of War and Members of Their Families".

== Bibliography ==
- Soviet Prosecutor's Office – Moscow: State Publishing House of Legal Literature, 1947

== Sources ==
- State Power of the Soviet Union. The Highest Authorities and Management and Their Leaders. 1923–1991. Historical and Biographical Reference Book / Compiled by Vladimir Ivkin – Moscow: Russian Political Encyclopedia, 1999 – ISBN 978-5-8243-0014-7
- Andrey Lushnikov. Labor Law Science: Historical and Legal Essays in Persons and Events. Moscow, 2003

Preceded by Ivan Golyakov	Director of the All–Union Institute of Legal Sciences; 1956–1963	Succeeded by Sergey Bratus (as director of the All–Union Scientific Research Institute of Soviet Legislation)
