= Lev Smirnov =

Soviet lawyer and judge (1911–1986)

- Лев Смирнов

6th Chairman of the Supreme Court of the Soviet Union
- In office September 20, 1972 – April 12, 1984
- Preceded by: Alexander Gorkin
- Succeeded by: Vladimir Terebilov

10th Chairman of the Supreme Court of the Russian Soviet Federative Socialist Republic
- In office July 1962 – September 1972
- Preceded by: Anatoly Rubichev
- Succeeded by: Alexander Orlov

Personal details
- Born: June 21, 1911 Saint Petersburg, Russian Empire
- Died: March 23, 1986 (aged 74) Moscow, Soviet Union
- Resting place: Novodevichye Cemetery (Moscow)
- Party: Communist Party of the Soviet Union (1945–1984)
- Education: Leningrad State University; Law Institute Named After Nikolay Krylenko (Leningrad)
- Awards: Hero of Socialist Labour; Order of Lenin; Order of the October Revolution; Order of the Red Banner of Labour; Order of the Patriotic War; Order of the Red Star

Lev Nikolayevich Smirnov (Russian: Лев Николаевич Смирнов; June 21, 1911 – March 23, 1986) was a Soviet lawyer, Chairman of the Supreme Court of the Soviet Union in 1972–1984, Chairman of the Association of Soviet Lawyers, Hero of Socialist Labour.

== Biography ==
Born in Saint Petersburg in the family of a physician.

In 1929–1936, he studied at the Leningrad State University at the Faculty of Soviet Law and at the Nikolay Krylenko Institute of Law, as well as (since 1939) in graduate school, which he did not complete due to the outbreak of the Great Patriotic War.

Since 1934 – Senior Investigator of the Leningrad Regional Prosecutor's Office.

In 1935–1938 – Senior Investigator of the Murmansk District Prosecutor's Office.

Since 1938 – Senior Investigator of the Petrograd District of Leningrad.

Since 1939 – Senior Investigator and Methodologist of the Leningrad City Prosecutor's Office.

On June 23, 1941, he was drafted into the army, served as a military investigator in the prosecutor's offices of the active armies and the Leningrad Front.

From September 1942 – in the Prosecutor's Office of the Soviet Union (investigator for the most important cases, prosecutor of the investigation department, prosecutor for special assignments under the Prosecutor General of the Soviet Union). He was engaged in investigating the crimes of the Nazis in the occupied territories of the Soviet Union.

Participated in the work of the Nuremberg International Military Tribunal as an assistant to the chief prosecutor from the Soviet Union, Roman Rudenko. Supported the charges section by section:

- Crimes against civilians, crimes against humanity committed by the Nazis in the occupied territories of the Soviet Union, Czechoslovakia, Poland, Yugoslavia, Greece;
- Individual guilt of defendants Frank, Kaltenbrunner, Streicher;
- Evidence of the guilt of the criminal organizations of the Protection Squadron, Secret State Police and Security Service.

In 1946, he was Deputy Prosecutor from the Soviet Union of Prosecutor Sergei Golunsky at the Tokyo International Trial on charges of the main Japanese war criminals (military aggression in the areas of Lake Khasan and the Khalkhin Gol River).

He was a public prosecutor at the Khabarovsk Trial.

In 1957–1962 – Deputy Chairman of the Supreme Court of the Soviet Union.

In 1962–1972 – Chairman of the Supreme Court of the Russian Soviet Federative Socialist Republic. Conducted the trial of the participants in the Novocherkassk events, sentenced nine Novocherkassk workers to death.

In 1965–1966 – led the Process of Sinyavsky and Daniel.

In 1972–1984 – Chairman of the Supreme Court of the Soviet Union.

Since 1984 – retired.

Member of the Communist Party of the Soviet Union since 1945.

Member of the Central Committee of the Communist Party of the Soviet Union in 1976–1986.

Deputy of the Supreme Soviet of the Soviet Union of the 8th, 9th, 10th convocations.

He was a member of the International Commission of Inquiry to Expose the Atrocities of American Imperialism in Vietnam, a member of the United Nations Standing Advisory Committee of Experts on the Prevention of Crime and the Treatment of Criminals, a member of the Council of the International Organization of Democratic Lawyers, and an honorary doctorate in law from a number of foreign universities.

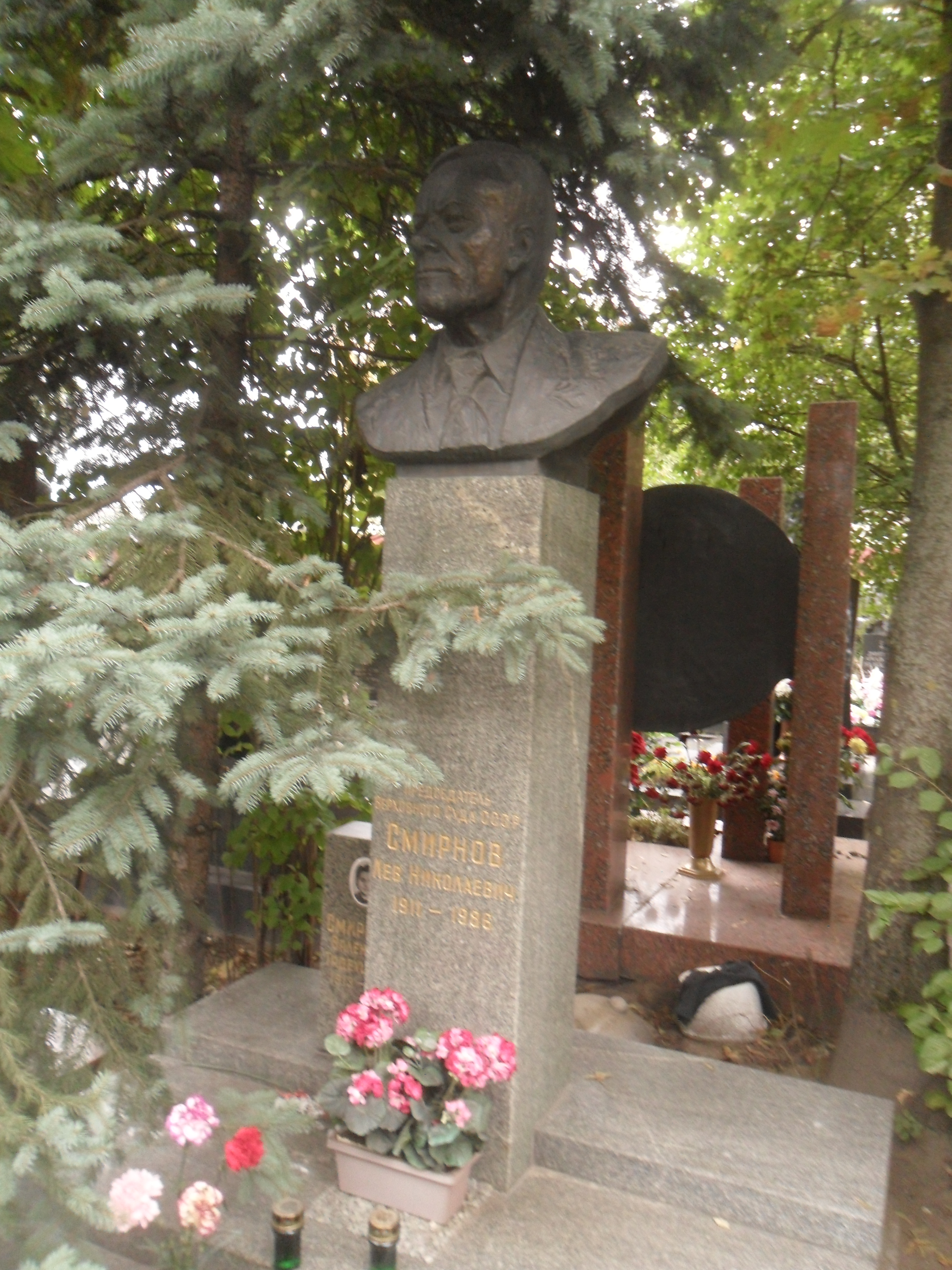
Smirnov's grave at the Novodevichy Cemetery in Moscow

He died on March 23, 1986, in Moscow. He was buried at the Novodevichy Cemetery.

== Compositions ==
- Lev Smirnov, Evgeny Zaitsev. Tokyo Court – Moscow: Military Publishing House of the Ministry of Defense of the Soviet Union, 1978 – 544 Pages

== Awards ==
- Hero of Socialist Labour (1981);
- 3 Orders of Lenin;
- Order of the October Revolution;
- Order of the Red Banner of Labour;
- Order of the Patriotic War, 1st class;
- Order of the Red Star;
- Medals of the Soviet Union;
- Foreign State Awards.

== Sources ==
- "Lev Smirnov". warheroes.ru (in Russian).
- Smirnov Lev Nikolaevich – article from the Great Soviet Encyclopedia
- Smirnov Lev Nikolaevich // "People and Books" Website
- Alexander Zvyagintsev, Yuri Orlov. Unknown Themis. Documents, Events, People – Moscow: OLMA–PRESS, 2003 – Pages 401–402 – ISBN 5-224-04224-0
