= List of Prosecutor Generals of Russia and the Soviet Union =

This article is a list of officeholders of the prosecutor generals of Russia and later the Soviet Union, starting from the 18th century to present.

== Prosecutors General of the Russian Empire ==
Prosecutor General	Term of Office		Emperor
Count Pavel Yaguzhinsky	12 January 1722	1726	Peter the Great; Catherine I
Vacant (1726 — 1730)
Count Pavel Yaguzhinsky	1730	6 April 1736	Anne
Vacant (6 April 1736 — 28 April 1740)
Prince Nikita Trubetskoy	28 April 1740	15 August 1760	Anne; Ivan VI; Elizabeth
Prince Yakov Shakhovsky	15 August 1760	25 December 1761	Elizabeth
Alexander Glebov	25 December 1761	3 February 1764	Peter III; Catherine the Great
Prince Alexander Vyazemsky	3 February 1764	17 September 1792	Catherine the Great
Count Alexander Samoylov	17 September 1792	4 December 1796	Catherine the Great; Paul I
Prince Alexey Kurakin	4 December 1796	8 August 1798	Paul I
Prince Pyotr Lopukhin	8 August 1798	7 July 1799	Paul I
Alexander Bekleshov	7 July 1799	2 February 1800	Paul I
Peter Obolyaninov	2 February 1800	16 March 1801	Paul I Alexander I
Alexander Bekleshov	16 March 1801	8 September 1802	Alexander I

== Procurator General of the Soviet Union ==
=== Prosecutors of Soviet Russia ===
Prosecutor	Term of Office		Leader of the RSFSR
Dmitry Kursky	28 May 1922	16 January 1928	Mikhail Kalinin
Nikolai Janson	16 January 1928	May 1929	Mikhail Kalinin
Nikolai Krylenko	May 1929	5 May 1931	Mikhail Kalinin
Andrey Vyshinsky	11 May 1931	1933	Mikhail Kalinin
Vladimir Antonov-Ovseyenko	25 May 1934	25 September 1936	Mikhail Kalinin
Faina Nyurina (acting Prosecutor)	14 November 1936	August 1937	Mikhail Kalinin
Nikolay Rychkov	August 1937	January 1938	Mikhail Kalinin
Ivan Golyakov	31 January 1938	14 April 1938	Mikhail Kalinin
Mikhail Pankratyev	20 May 1938	31 May 1939	Mikhail Kalinin; Alexei Badayev
Anatoly Volin	25 July 1939	25 August 1948	Alexei Badayev; Nikolai Shvernik; Ivan Vlasov
Pavel Baranov	31 December 1948	13 April 1954	Ivan Vlasov; Mikhail Tarasov
Alexei Kruglov	13 April 1954	19 August 1963	Mikhail Tarasov; Nikolai Ignatov; Nikolai Organov; Nikolai Ignatov
Vladimir Blinov	29 November 1963	September 1970	Nikolai Ignatov; Mikhail Yasnov
Boris Kravtsov	21 January 1971	12 April 1984	Mikhail Yasnov
Sergei Yemelyanov	26 June 1984	28 May 1990	Mikhail Yasnov; Vladimir Orlov; Vitaly Vorotnikov
Nikolai Trubin	28 May 1990	11 December 1990	Boris Yeltsin

== Prosecutor General of the Russian Federation ==
Prosecutor General	Term of Office		President of Russia
Valentin Stepankov	28 February 1991	5 October 1993	Boris Yeltsin
Alexey Kazannik	5 October 1993	14 March 1994	Boris Yeltsin
Alexey Ilyushenko (acting Prosecutor General)	26 March 1994	8 October 1995	Boris Yeltsin
Oleg Gaidanov (acting Prosecutor General)	8 October 1995	24 October 1995	Boris Yeltsin
Yury Skuratov	24 October 1995	2 February 1999	Boris Yeltsin
Yury Chaika (acting Prosecutor General)	2 February 1999	6 August 1999	Boris Yeltsin
Vladimir Ustinov (acting Prosecutor General from 6 August 1999 to 17 May 2000)	17 May 2000	2 June 2006	Boris Yeltsin; Vladimir Putin
Yury Chaika	23 June 2006	22 January 2020	Vladimir Putin; Dmitry Medvedev; Vladimir Putin
Igor Krasnov	22 January 2020	24 September 2025	Vladimir Putin
Aleksandr Gutsan	24 September 2025	present	Vladimir Putin

== See also ==
- List of Justice Ministers of Imperial Russia
- Procurator General of the Soviet Union
