= Kazan Law Institute =

Russian law school

- Казанский юридический институт
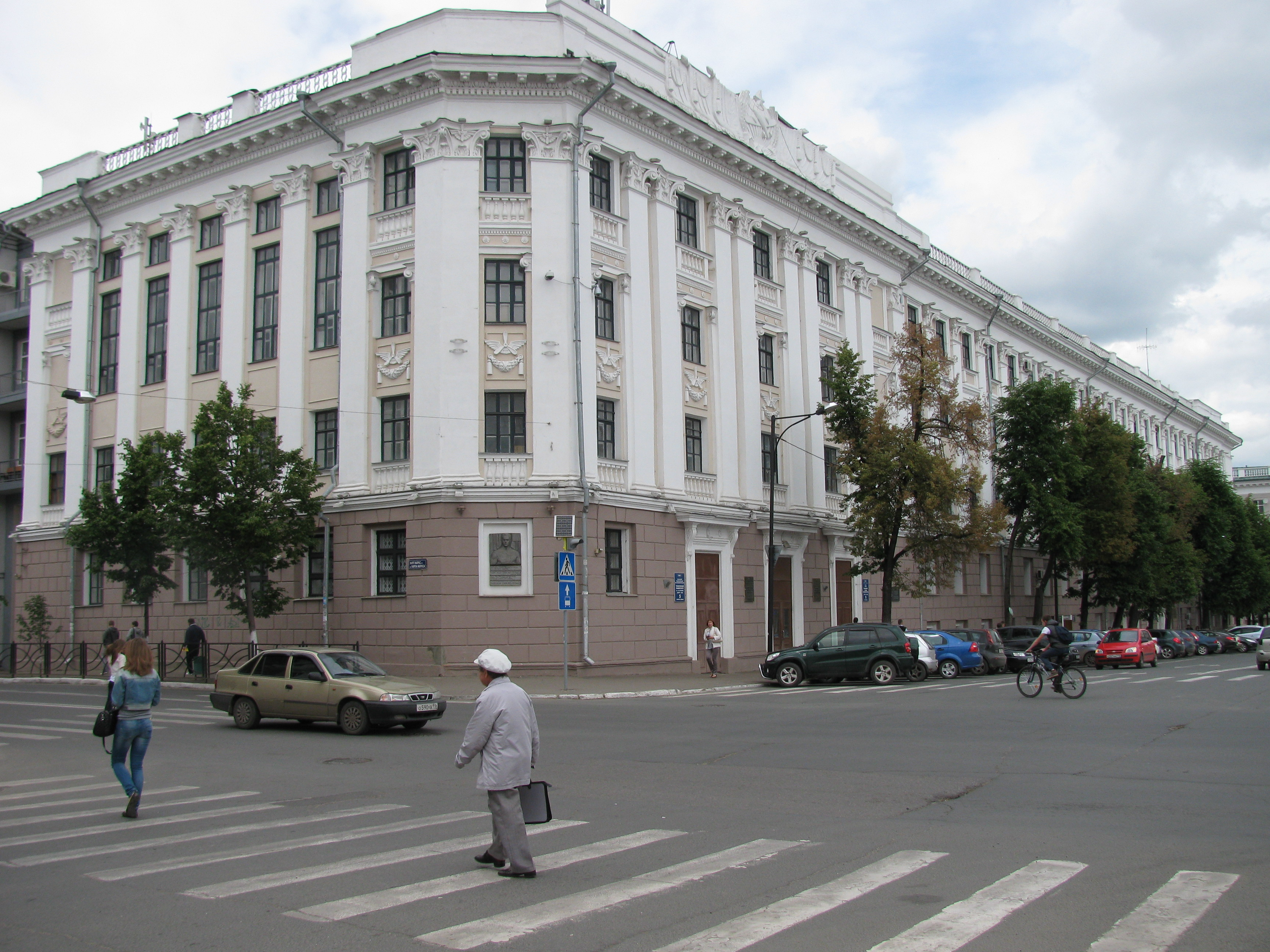
- Established: 1931
- Location: Kazan, Russia
- Language: Russian

Kazan Law Institute (Russian: Казанский юридический институт) is a Higher education institution in Kazan, founded in 1931 to train lawyers. Reorganized in 1952 by joining the Kazan Federal University.

== History ==
In 1919, the Faculty of Law, which had existed in the structure of the Imperial Kazan University since 1804, was abolished. On 11 July 1919, on the basis of the abolished law faculty as part of Kazan State University, the faculty of social sciences was created as part of three departments: legal-political, historical and economic. The composition of the legal and political department included the teaching staff from the abolished law faculty. The department trained jurists with higher legal education. In 1922, by order of the People's Commissariat of Education of the RSFSR, a decision was made to close the faculties of social sciences and their legal and political departments.

On 17 November 1926, at the initiative of the People's Commissar of Justice of the TASSR G.B. Bogautdinov and with the approval of the People's Commissar of Justice of the RSFSR Dmitry Kursky judicial and investigative workers to staff the prosecutor's office and the court. On 1 October 1928, by the Decree of the Council of People's Commissars of the RSFSR, this faculty was created and began its work as part of three departments: Soviet law, Soviet construction and economics. The number of students was seventy-five people, the term of study was four years. The curriculum at the faculty included a wide range of socio-political disciplines, including the practice of institute graduates in judicial institutions and the prosecutor's office. On 6 May 1931, by the Decree of the Presidium of the All-Russian Central Executive Committee, on the basis of the Faculty of Soviet Construction and Law, an independent Kazan Institute of Soviet Law was formed to train personnel with higher legal education for Soviet institutions of the national republics. The structure of the institute consisted of two departments: judicial-prosecuting-investigative (it included a special cycle for the specialization of investigators) and economic and legal. The term of study at the institute was three years. Every year, one hundred and fifty people graduated from the institute.

In 1932, the building of the former post office on Svoboda Square, built at the beginning of the 19th century in the style of Classicism, was transferred to the Kazan Institute of Soviet Law. During the reconstruction according to the project of the architect M. S. Grigoriev, it was built on two floors, the main entrance was placed in a niche, and a balcony appeared above it.

In 1936, by the Decree of the Council of People's Commissars of the RSFSR, the Kazan Institute of Soviet Law was renamed the Kazan Law Institute. On 26 June 1936, students of the liquidated Kazan Institute of Soviet Construction were transferred to the Law Institute. The structure of the institute included ten general institute departments: civil law and process, theory of state and law, history of state and law, criminal law, criminal procedure and criminalistics, a special department, Marxism–Leninism, political economy, foreign languages and physical culture and sports. Two faculties were organized: daytime and evening. In addition to the main teaching staff, prominent legal teachers from other universities were involved in teaching, including: P. N. Galanza and M. K. Korbut (theory of state and law), V. P. Syromyatnikov (history of institutions of public law), A. I. Vinaver (history of private law institutions), S. P. Singalevich and N. N. Firsov (history of the class struggle in Russia and the West).

From 1941 to 1945, during the Great Patriotic War, the institute worked as usual. Since 1945, after the end of the war, three hundred thirty-four students were admitted to the first year of the institute, in 1946 – four hundred and twenty-one students, in 1947 – four hundred and seventy-seven students. From 1945 to 1949, the number of students enrolled in all four courses of the institute on the job doubled, so in 1945 there were five hundred and seventy-nine students, and in 1949 their number increased to one thousand four hundred and forty-four students. An average of about five hundred and fifty students studied at the correspondence department. In general, during the existence of the institute, it has trained more than 3,000 specialists in the field of law to work in the prosecutor's office, bodies of the Ministry of Internal Affairs, including investigative ones, in judicial institutions, advocacy, in the Soviet and party apparatus. From 1950 to 1951, the Kazan branch of the All-Union Correspondence Law Institute was part of the institute.

In 1952, by a decree of the Council of Ministers of the Soviet Union, the Kazan Law Institute was reorganized and, as a law faculty, was included in the Kazan Federal University, and the building of the institute was transferred to one of the divisions of the Kazan National Research Technical University named after A.N. Tupolev.

== Notable teachers ==
- Konstantin Gorshenin

== Notable graduates ==
- Pavlov, Ivan Vasilievich – Doctor of Law, Professor, Honored Scientist of the RSFSR, Editor-in-Chief of the journal "Soviet State and Law"
- Reznichenko, Iosif Moiseevich – Doctor of Law, Professor, Honored Lawyer of the Russian Federation
- Falkovich, Mark Samuilovich – PhD in law, Professor, Honored Lawyer of the RSFSR
- Vinetsky, Yan Borisovich – a member of the Union of Writers of the USSR and the Union of Writers of the TASSR, Honored Worker of Culture of the Tatar Autonomous Soviet Socialist Republic
- Ivnik, Ivan Nikolaevich – Chuvash Soviet poet, translator and folklorist
- Muginov, Rafael Sharipovich – Head of the Kazan Law Institute of the Ministry of Internal Affairs of Russia

== Literature ==
- Татарская энциклопедия: в 5 томах / гл. ред. М. Х. Хасанов. - Казань : Институт татарской энциклопедии АН РТ, Т. 3: К—Л. — 2006. — 663 с. — ISBN 5-902375-03-7
- Казанские юридические школы: эволюция образовательных и научных традиций в современной юриспруденции / под ред. И. А. Тарханова, Валеев, З. А. Ахметьяновой; Казанский (Приволжский) федеральный университет [и др.]. – Москва : Статут, 2016. — 512 с. — ISBN 978-5-8354-1229-7
- Высшее образование и наука в Татарии: 1918–1969 / Е. М. Мишина, В. И. Шишкин, Л. А. Хайдарова; [Предисл. д-ра ист. наук, проф. М. К. Мухарямова]; Казан. гос. ун-т им. В. И. Ульянова-Ленина. Науч. б-ка им. Н. И. Лобачевского. - Казань : Изд-во Казан. ун-та, 1971. — 136 с.
- Национальный архив Республики Татарстан : Путеводитель / 2. изд., перераб. и доп. - Казань : Нац. арх. Респ. Татарстан, 1999. — 615 с. —
- Юридический факультет Казанского университета : два века образования и науки / И. А. Тарханов и др.; науч. ред. И. А. Тарханов. - Казань : изд-во Казан. ун-та, 2004. — 175 с. — ISBN 5-7464-0528-0

== Sources ==
- "Казанский юридический институт". Federal Archival Agency.
- "Из истории Юридического факультета". Kazan Federal University.
- "Юридический факультет КФУ отметил 210-летний юбилей". Официальный портал органов местного самоуправления города Казани. Archived from the original on 2022-02-22.
