= Procurator General of the Soviet Union =

Highest prosecutor office in the Soviet Union

- Генеральный прокурор СССР
- Insignia

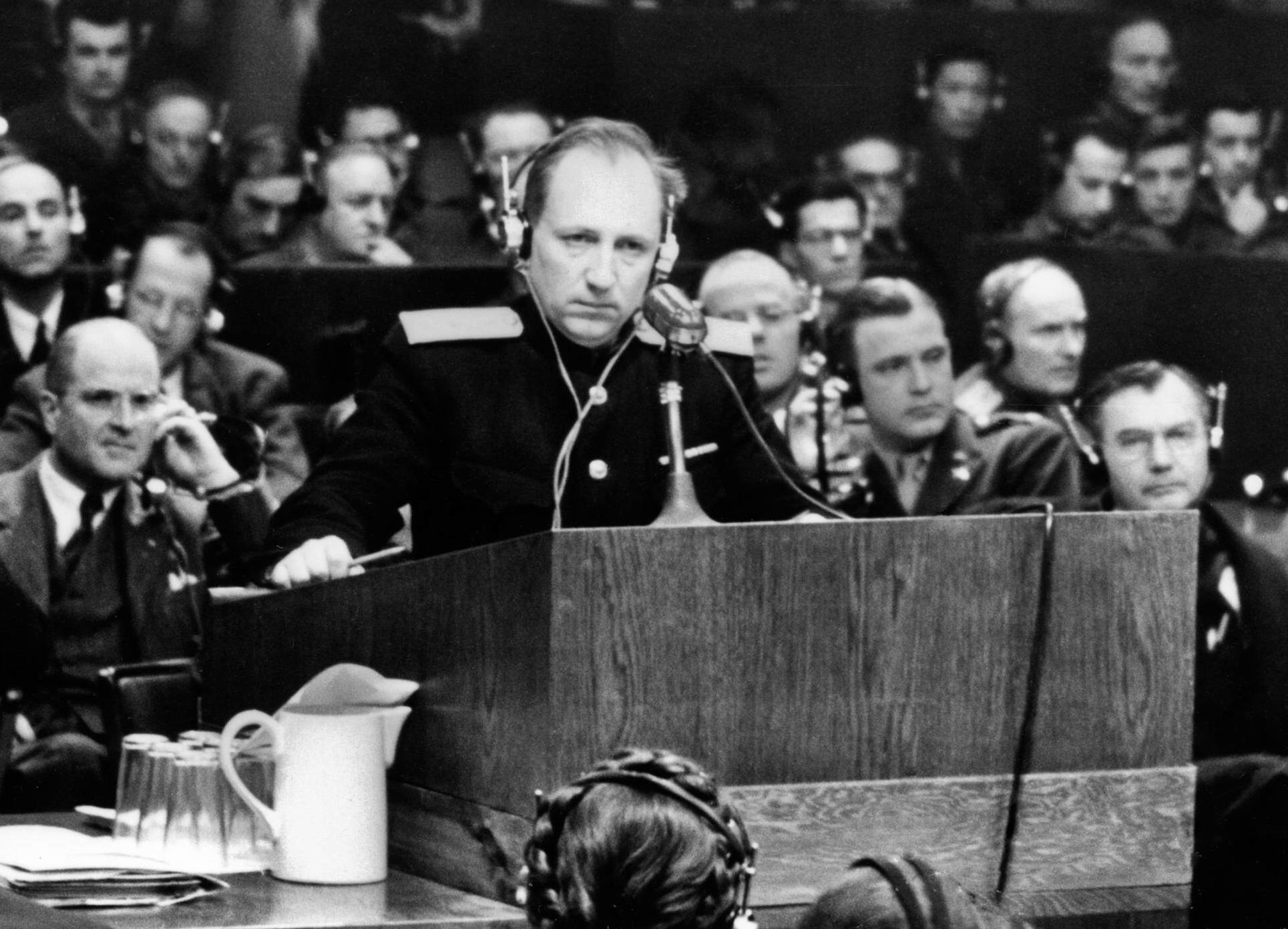
- Longest serving Roman Rudenko; 1 July 1953 – 23 January 1981
- Office of the Public Procurator of the USSR
- Type: Public procurators
- Status: Abolished
- Precursor: Procurator General of the Russian Empire
- Formation: 15 March 1924
- First holder: Pyotr Krasikov
- Final holder: Nikolai Trubin
- Abolished: 29 January 1992
- Succession: Procurator General of the Russian Federation

The Procurator General of the USSR (Russian: Генеральный прокурор СССР, romanized: Generalnyi prokuror SSSR) was the highest functionary of the Office of the Public Procurator of the USSR, responsible for the whole system of offices of public procurators and supervision of their activities on the territory of the Soviet Union.

== History ==
The office of procurator had its historical roots in Imperial Russia, and under Soviet law public procurators had wide-ranging responsibilities including, but not limited to, those of public prosecutors found in other legal systems. Offices of Public Procurators were and are still used in other countries adhering to the doctrine of socialist law.

The Office of Public Procurator of the USSR was created in 1936, and its head was called Public Procurator of the USSR until 1946, when it was changed to Procurator General of the USSR. According to the 1936 Soviet Constitution, the Procurator General exercised the highest degree of direct or indirect (through subordinate public procurators) control over the accurate execution of laws by all ministries, departments, their subordinate establishments and enterprises, executive and administrative bodies of local Soviets, cooperative organizations, officials (including judges in court proceedings), and citizens on behalf of the state.

The Procurator General was appointed by the Supreme Soviet of the USSR for a 5-year term and given a class rank of the Active state counselor of justice. His deputies and Procurator General of the Armed Forces were appointed by the Presidium of the Supreme Soviet of the USSR on recommendation from Procurator General. The Procurator General appointed public procurators of the Soviet republics and, on their recommendation, public procurators of autonomous republics, krais, oblasts and autonomous oblasts. He also issued orders and instructions for all of the offices of public procurators, instructed on differentiation of their competence, etc.

The Procurator General had the right to present his issues to the Presidium of the Supreme Soviet that needed to be solved in the legislative manner or demanded interpretation of the law.

The Procurator General's participation in the plenary sessions of the Supreme Court of the USSR was mandatory. He had the right to obtain on demand any case from any court for checking purposes, voice his protest over a law, verdict, decree, or definition, which had already come into force, of any court and to suspend them until the matter was resolved.

== Procurators General ==
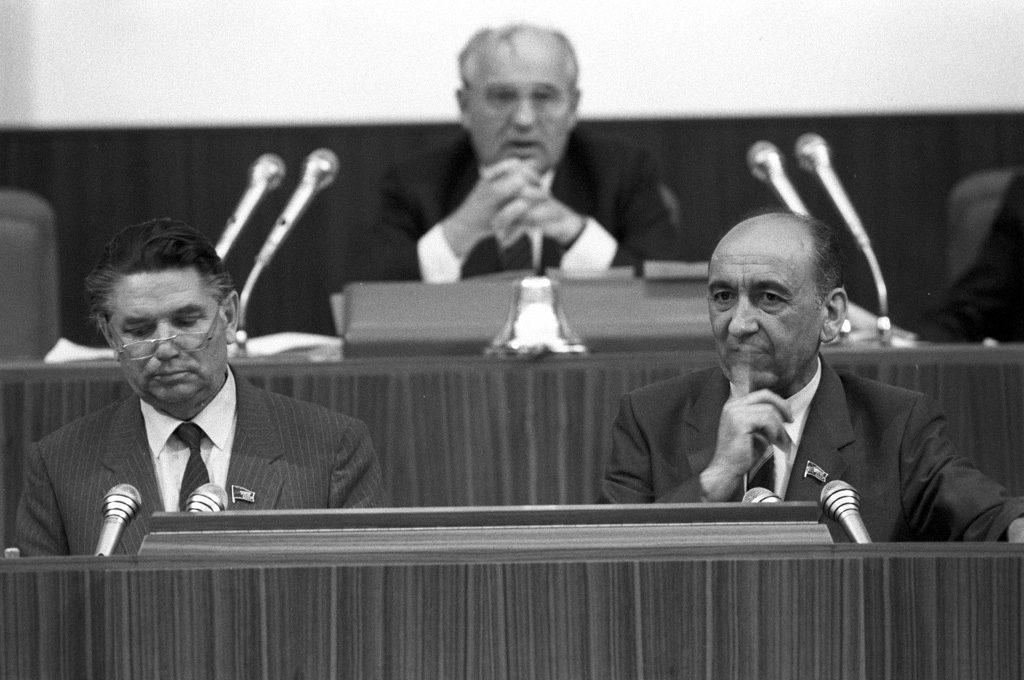
Alexander Sukharev (left) at the 1st convocation of the Congress of People's Deputies of the Soviet Union with investigator Telman Gdlyan (right) and Mikhail Gorbachev (center)

No.	Portrait	Name (Born-Died)	Term of office		
No.	Portrait	Name (Born-Died)	Took office	Left office	Time in office
1	Pyotr Krasikov	Pyotr Krasikov (1870–1939)	15 March 1924	20 June 1933	9 years, 97 days
2	Ivan Akulov	Ivan Akulov (1888–1937)	20 June 1933	3 March 1935	1 year, 256 days
3	Andrey Vyshinsky	Andrey Vyshinsky (1883–1954) (from 1931 - the prosecutor of the RSFSR)	3 March 1935	31 May 1939	4 years, 89 days
4	Mikhail Pankratyev	Mikhail Pankratyev (1901–1974)	31 May 1939	7 August 1940	1 year, 68 days
5	Viktor Bochkov [ru]	Viktor Bochkov (1900–1981)	7 August 1940	11 March 1943	2 years, 216 days
6	Konstantin Gorshenin	Konstantin Gorshenin (1907–1978) (from 1946—Procurator General of the USSR)	12 March 1943	4 February 1948	4 years, 329 days
7	Gregory Safonov [ru]	Gregory Safonov (1904–1972)	5 February 1948	8 August 1953	5 years, 184 days
8	Roman Rudenko	Roman Rudenko (1907–1981)	8 August 1953	23 January 1981	27 years, 168 days
9	Alexander Rekunkov	Alexander Rekunkov (1920–1996)	9 February 1981	26 May 1988	7 years, 107 days
10	Aleksandr Sukharev [ru]	Aleksandr Sukharev (1923–2021)	26 May 1988	22 September 1990	2 years, 119 days
11	Nikolai Trubin [ru]	Nikolai Trubin (1931–1996)	11 December 1990	29 January 1992	1 year, 49 days

== See also ==
- List of Prosecutor Generals of Russia and the Soviet Union
- People's Court of the USSR
- Supreme Court of the USSR
- Ministry of Justice of the USSR
- Procurator General of the Russian Federation
