= Law of the Soviet Union =

Soviet law from 1917-1991

The Law of the Soviet Union was the legal system as it developed in the Soviet Union (USSR) following the October Revolution of 1917. Modified versions of the Soviet legal system operated in many Communist states following the Second World War—including Mongolia, the People's Republic of China, the Warsaw Pact countries of eastern Europe, Cuba and Vietnam. In Soviet law, the supreme state organ of power (SSOP) was the supreme articulator and defender of the legal order, and the supreme judicial organ and the supreme procuratorial organ were state organs subjugated to the SSOP's leadership.

== Soviet concept of law ==
Soviet law was rooted in pre-revolutionary Russian law and Marxism-Leninism. Pre-revolutionary influences included Byzantine law, Mongol law, Russian Orthodox Canon law, and Western law. Western law was mostly absent until the judicial reform of Alexander II in 1864, five decades before the revolution. Despite this, the supremacy of law and equality before the law were not well-known concepts, the tsar was still not bound by the law, and the "police had unlimited authority."

Marxism-Leninism views law as a superstructure in the base and superstructure model of society. "Capitalist" law was a tool of "bourgeois domination and a reflection of bourgeois values." Since law was a tool "to maintain class domination", in a classless society, law would inevitably disappear.

Like all other government institutions, the judiciary was officially subordinated to the Supreme Soviet of the Soviet Union.

In 1917, the Soviet authorities formally repealed all Tsarist legislation and established a socialist legal system. According to a critic, Richard Pipes, this system abolished Western legal concepts including the rule of law, civil liberties, the protection of law and guarantees of property. For example, profiteering could be interpreted as a counter-revolutionary activity punishable by death. Soviet authors claimed that a new socialist rule of law was created, protecting personal properties and civil liberties, and developing the basis of an international rule of law.

The deportation of the 'Kulaks' in 1928–31 was carried out within the terms of Soviet Civil Code. Some Soviet legal scholars even asserted that "'criminal repression' may be applied in the absence of guilt.".

The 1936 Constitution introduced Stalin's view of a "socialist legal culture" proposed to increase regularity and predictability of legal outcomes and institutionalize the results of industrialization and collectivization. The Soviet legal system developed such that the large majority of legal disputes were adjudicated by a professional judiciary according to established principles, while cases deemed as politically significant were subject to extralegal state control.

The year 1960 saw a new edition the Soviet criminal code. The new Criminal Code replaced the Soviet analogue of 1960.

The 1960s reforms tried to improve the judicial system and the activities of the courts, the restoration and development of several democratic principles dismantling special conferences attached to the USSR Ministry of Internal Affairs and certain categories of state crimes.

== Constitutional law ==
- 1918 Soviet Russian Constitution
- 1924 Soviet Constitution
- 1936 Soviet Constitution
- 1977 Soviet Constitution

== Court structure ==
Soviet criminal and civil cases involve trials that were "primarily[...]official investigation[s] of the truth of the claims and defenses presented". Soviet law was very similar in this respect to civil law of European countries like France and Germany.

=== Criminal cases ===
Criminal cases consisted of a preliminary examination before the indictment and the actual trial. In the preliminary examination, the sledovatel (or "investigator") "interrogate[d] the accused and the witnesses and examine[d] evidence". The accused was informed of his/her rights before the examination. Before 1958, counsel was only available during the trial. After 1958, counsel was available at the last stage of the preliminary examination after the accused was indicted. The examiner was prohibited from using force though the accused could be confined for long durations: up to 10 days before being charged, up to 9 months during the preliminary investigation (with the approval of the Procurator General). The testimony to be used in the trial was presented to the accused. The sledovatel was subordinate to the procurator (prokuratura) that was tasked with the prosecution, "'general supervision' of legality", and reporting illegal administrative actions. The indictment that included the preliminary examination was considered the "official record" at trial.

The trial court consisted of a professional judge with a 5-year term and two assessors (lay judges) from the population with a 2.5-year term. The proceedings were informal compared to criminal procedure in democratic countries based on the rule of law. The judges first questioned accused and witnesses, then the procurator and defense counsel to corroborate the evidence in the indictment. The accused and the victim could question each other or the witnesses. The accused was presumed innocent, though not in the common law sense. The court decided by majority vote. The accused or the procurator could appeal decisions to a higher court consisting of three professional judges that reviewed the facts and the law. If the procurator appealed, the higher court could set aside the judgment and remand the case. Although the decision of the appeals court was "final", higher courts could review them as "supervision". Here, the accused or his/her counsel could submit briefs, but they could not appear in person.

During the trial, the judges had the additional responsibility of educating the people, for example revealing and removing the causes and conditions that led to the crime. Judges kept legal technicalities to a minimum; the court's stated purpose was to find the truth, rather than to protect legal rights. Although most hearings were open to the public, hearings could also be held privately, if the Soviet Government deemed it necessary.

=== Civil court ===
Soviet civil court process did not entail a high degree of physical interference. There was no sudden arrest or detention during a preliminary investigation phase. The trial was conducted entirely by a counsel and, if need be, a stay was obtained.

== Human rights ==
According to the Universal Declaration of Human Rights, human rights are the "basic [rights] and freedoms to which all humans are entitled", including the right to [life] and [liberty], freedom of expression, and equality before the law; and social, cultural and economic rights, including the right to participate in culture, the right to food, the right to work, and the right to education.

The Soviet conception of human rights was very different from international law. According to Soviet legal theory, "it is the government who is the beneficiary of human rights which are to be asserted against the individual". The Soviet state was considered as the source of human rights. Therefore, the Soviet legal system regarded law as an arm of politics and courts as agencies of the government. Extensive extrajudicial powers were given to the Soviet secret police agencies. The Soviet government in practice significantly curbed the rule of law, civil liberties, protection of law and guarantees of property, which were considered as examples of "bourgeois morality" by Soviet law theorists such as Andrey Vyshinsky. According to Vladimir Lenin, the purpose of socialist courts was "not to eliminate terror ... but to substantiate it and legitimize it in principle".

The USSR and other countries of the Soviet bloc had abstained from affirming the Universal Declaration of Human Rights (1948), saying it was "overly juridical" and potentially infringed on national sovereignty. The Soviet Union later signed legally-binding human rights documents, such as the International Covenant on Civil and Political Rights in 1973 (and the 1966 International Covenant on Economic, Social and Cultural Rights), but they were neither widely known or accessible to people living under Communist rule, nor were they taken seriously by the Communist authorities. Sergei Kovalev recalled "the famous article 125 of the Constitution which enumerated all basic civil and political rights" in the Soviet Union. But when he and other prisoners attempted to use this as a legal basis for their abuse complaints, their prosecutor's argument was that "the Constitution was written not for you, but for American Negroes, so that they know how happy the lives of Soviet citizens are".

Crime was determined not as the infraction of law, but as any action which could threaten the Soviet state and society. For example, a desire to make a profit could be interpreted as a counter-revolutionary activity punishable by death. The liquidation and deportation of millions of peasants in 1928–31 was carried out within the terms of the Soviet Civil Code. Some Soviet legal scholars even said that "criminal repression" may be applied in the absence of guilt. Martin Latsis, chief of Soviet Ukraine's secret police explained: "Do not look in the file of incriminating evidence to see whether or not the accused rose up against the Soviets with arms or words. Ask him instead to which class he belongs, what is his background, his education, his profession. These are the questions that will determine the fate of the accused. That is the meaning and essence of the Red Terror."

The purpose of public trials was "not to demonstrate the existence or absence of a crime – that was predetermined by the appropriate party authorities – but to provide yet another forum for political agitation and propaganda for the instruction of the citizenry (see Moscow Trials for example). Defense lawyers, who had to be party members, were required to take their client's guilt for granted..."

== See also ==
Theory and decrees

- Soviet Decrees
- Show trial
- NKVD troika
- Burlaw court

Organizations

- Ministry of Justice of the USSR
- Supreme Court of the Soviet Union

Other

- List of Russian legal historians
- Law of the Russian Federation

== Bibliography ==
- Bloche, Gregg (Spring 1986). "Law, theory, and politics: the dilemma of Soviet psychiatry". The Yale Journal of International Law. 11 (2): 298–358.
- Butler, William Elliott (1988) [1983]. Soviet law (2nd ed.). Stoneham, Massachusetts: Butterworths Legal Publishers. ISBN 978-0406562647.
- Sharlet, Robert (1974). "Samizdat as a source for the study of Soviet law". The Soviet and Post-Soviet Review. 1 (1): 181–196. doi:10.1163/187633274x00144.
- Guins, George C. (1950-05-01). "Penalties and Rewards in Soviet Law". Washington Law Review. 25 (2): 206–222.
