= Ministry of Justice (Soviet Union) =

Government ministry of the Soviet Union

Ministry of Justice of the USSR
- Министерство юстиции СССР
- All ministry seals of the Soviet Union used the State Emblem

Agency overview
- Formed: 16 July 1923
- Dissolved: 15 November 1991
- Superseding agency: Ministry of Justice of the Russian Federation (1992)
- Jurisdiction: Government of the Soviet Union
- Headquarters: Moscow, Russia

The Ministry of Justice of the Union of Soviet Socialist Republics (USSR) (Russian: Министерство юстиции СССР, Ministerstvo Yustitsii SSSR), formed on 15 March 1946, was one of the most important government offices in the Soviet Union. It was formerly (until 1946) known as the People's Commissariat for Justice (Russian: Народный комиссариат юстиции, Narodniy Komissariat Yustitsi'i) abbreviated as Наркомюст (Narkomiust or sometimes known in English as "Narkomyust"). The Ministry, at the All-Union (USSR-wide) level, was established in the 1936 Soviet Constitution, and was in turn based upon the People's Commissariat for Justice of the Russian Soviet Federative Socialist Republic (RSFSR) formed in 1917, with the latter becoming subordinate, along with the other republican Narkomyusts, to the Union-level People's Commissariat of Justice of the USSR. The Ministry was led by the Minister of Justice, prior to 1946 a Commissar, who was nominated by the Chairman of the Council of Ministers and confirmed by the Presidium of the Supreme Soviet, and was a member of the Council of Ministers.

The Ministry of Justice was responsible for courts, prisons, and probations. Further responsibilities included criminal justice policy, sentencing policy, and prevention of re-offending in the USSR. The Ministry was organised into All-Union and Union departments. The All-Union level ministries were divided into separate organisations in the Republican, Autonomous Oblast, and provincial level. The leadership of the Ministry of Justice came from notable Soviet law organisations from around the country.

== Duties and responsibilities ==
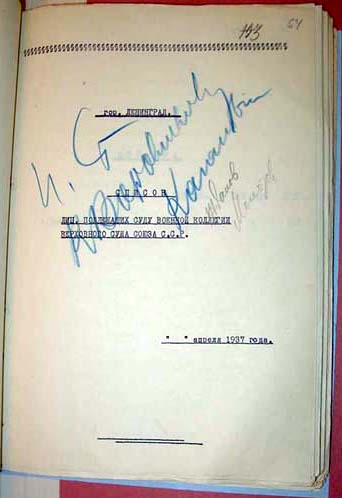
List of persons to be tried by the Military Collegium of the Supreme Court. Approving signatures: Joseph Stalin, Kliment Voroshilov, Lazar Kaganovich, Andrei Zhdanov, and Vyacheslav Molotov. The first page of a typical trial (de facto execution) list from the time of the Great Purge

According to a decree from 1972, the Ministry of Justice prepared proposals for the codification of law; it carried out methodological management of legal work in the national economy. The Ministry directed and coordinated the work of state bodies and public organisations to promote legal knowledge and to clarify the law among the population about the judicial agencies, as well as general management of the civil registry, state, and legal profession. The Ministry was liable to the Party, the state, and the people. The Ministry's main goal was to strengthen socialist legality and the rule of law within Soviet judicial institutions.

The Ministry was organised into one All-Union (USSR-wide) ministry and 15 Union ministries. The leadership of the ministry consisted of notable figures of the judicial authority of the Soviet Republics, the military tribunals, Bar members, notaries, and other judicial institutions. The leadership's task was to organise and prepare proposals for the codification of legislation. The organisational leadership, and the courts, had full control over the republican, autonomous, and provincial levels of government and the party. On 1 February 1923 the All-Union People's Commissariat for Justice was dissolved, and its responsibilities, duties, and functions were given to the Procurator General. The Department of the Procuracy of the Ministry of Justice, headed by a republican Procurator General, was responsible for limiting the powers of the Procurator General. On the grounds of stopping "unnecessary centralisation", the Ministry of Justice was dissolved both on the Union and the All-Union level. The functions of the Ministry was then handed to the Supreme Court and the Legal Commission of the Council of Ministers. The Ministry was reestablished in 1970 by the Alexei Kosygin government. Extensive regulations on the Ministry were created by the Council of Ministers. The Ministry's main task was to direct and supervise judicially organs, both at the Union and All-Union level, according to a decree from 1975.

The main task of the Ministry was to develop proposals on issues linked to the judicial system; the election of judges, elect the judiciary, organising the judiciary, studying and summarising of the jurisprudence in coordination with the Supreme Court, and to organise work for the maintenance of judicial statistics. According to Soviet law, the Ministry could propose various measures to improve the Soviet court system. According to Article 1 of the People's Commissariat for Justice, the commissariat's main task was to supervise the legal activities of the Soviet central agencies and the people's procurator.

== Organisation ==
The Ministry of Justice was headed by a Minister who was elected by the Presidium of the Supreme Soviet between seasons, and authenticated by a Supreme Soviet convocation. Deputy Ministers were elected by the Council of Ministers; allocation of the deputies was decided by the Ministry of Justice. Each deputy usually headed his or her own department. The minister, the deputies, and other senior officials formed the leadership circle, known as the Board of the Ministry of Justice. The members of this board were approved by the Council of Ministers. The Board of the Ministry held meetings regularly to discuss legal matters nationwide. Decisions made by the board were as a rule implemented nationwide. If the board disagreed they sought the assistance of the Council of Ministers to solve the problem.

The structure and number of employees of the Ministry were approved by the Council of Ministers. Staffing of the central apparatus of the Ministry, as well as provisions of the departments and divisions, were approved by the Ministry of Justice. The seal of the Ministry of Justice was the state emblem of the USSR.

== History ==
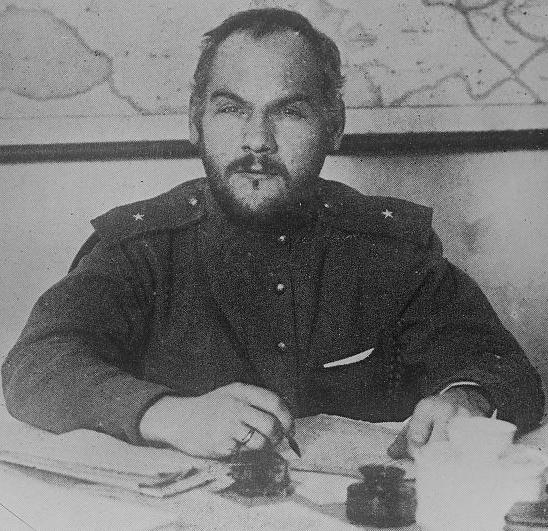
Nikolai Krylenko was the first People's Commissar for Justice of the USSR

In 1922 Vladimir Lenin chasitised the People's Commissariat for Justice for not dealing firmly enough with political opponents of the Bolsheviks and allowing capitalism to develop outside the framework of state capitalism outlined by the New Economic Policy. Until 1936 the People's Commissariat for Justice existed only in the Union Republican level. Nikolai Krylenko, the first People's Commissar of Justice, said in January 1933 that Soviet law waxed indignant about the leniency of some Soviet officials who objected to the infamous "five ears law":

We are sometimes up against a flat refusal to apply this law rigidly. One People's Judge told me flatly that he could never bring himself to throw someone in jail for stealing four ears. What we're up against here is a deep prejudice, imbibed with their mother's milk... a mistaken belief that people should be tried in accordance not with the Party's political guidelines but with considerations of "higher justice."

According to Abdurakhman Avtorkhanov, Nikita Khrushchev abolished the Ministry during the height of the Khrushchev Thaw in an attempt to restore the "Leninist norms of socialist legality" which had disappeared under Joseph Stalin's rule. Khrushchev tried to make the Soviet court more independent from central authority by enforcing the 1936 constitution on the country's judicial branch. This would, according to Khrushchev, give the courts further independence from the central authority. The functions, duties, and responsibilities of the Ministry were reassigned to the Supreme Soviet and the Legal Commission of the Council of Ministers at all levels of Soviet society. By the 1960s it became clear that these reforms were not working as planned, and the ministry was reestablished by the Alexei Kosygin government in 1970. The Ministry, along with the majority of other Soviet ministries, was supposed to be abolished in December 1991 on the orders of the State Soviet, this did not happen, and the Soviet Union dissolved itself before this date.

== Commissars and ministers ==
The following persons headed the Commissariat/Ministry as commissars (narkoms), ministers, and deputy ministers of the Soviet era:

Name	Took office	Left office	Duration
People's Commissar for Justice of the RSFSR (Narkom)
Georgy Oppokov	8 November 1917	29 November 1917	21 days
Pēteris Stučka	29 November 1917	22 December 1917	23 days
Isaac Steinberg	22 December 1917	18 March 1918	86 days
Pēteris Stučka	18 March 1918	14 September 1918	180 days
Dmitry Kursky	14 September 1918	6 July 1923	4 years, 295 days
People's Commissar for Justice of the USSR
Nikolai Krylenko	20 July 1936	15 September 1937	1 year, 57 days
Nikolai Rychkov	19 January 1939	15 March 1946	7 years, 55 days
Minister of Justice of the USSR
Nikolai Rychkov	15 March 1946	5 February 1948	1 year, 327 days
Konstantin Gorshenin	5 February 1948	31 May 1956	8 years, 116 days
Vladimir Terebilov	9 January 1970	11 April 1984	14 years, 93 days
Boris Kravtsov	11 April 1984	17 July 1989	5 years, 97 days
Veniamin Yakovlev	17 July 1989	11 December 1990	1 year, 147 days
Sergei Lushchikov	11 December 1990	24 August 1991	256 days

== See also ==
Law

- Socialist law
- Law of the Soviet Union
- Constitution of the Soviet Union

Organisations

- Foreign Legal Collegium
- Procurator General of the USSR
- People's Court of the USSR
- Supreme Court of the USSR
