= Volin (disambiguation) =

Volin was a Russian anarchist intellectual.

Volin may also refer to:

== Place ==
- Volin, South Dakota

== People ==
- Boris Volin, Soviet historian
- Anatoly Volin, Soviet statesman
