= Nikolai Krylenko =

Soviet politician (1885–1938)

- Николай Крыленко
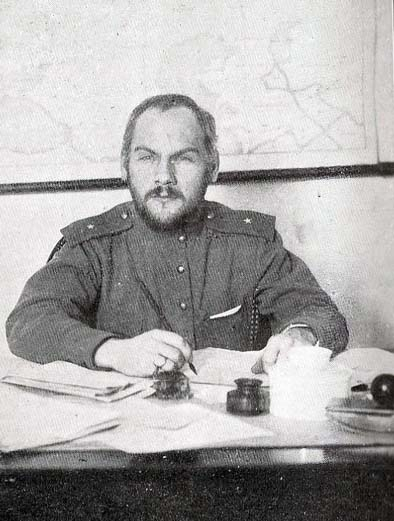
- Krylenko in 1918

People's Commissar for Justice of the USSR
- In office 20 July 1936 – 15 September 1937
- Premier: Vyacheslav Molotov
- Preceded by: None—position established
- Succeeded by: Nikolay Rychkov

Prosecutor General of the Russian SFSR
- In office May 1929 – 5 May 1931
- Premier: Alexey Rykov; Vyacheslav Molotov
- Preceded by: Nikolai Janson
- Succeeded by: Andrey Vyshinsky

Chairman of the Supreme Court of the Soviet Union
- In office 28 November 1923 – 2 February 1924
- Succeeded by: Alexander Vinokurov

Personal details
- Born: 2 May 1885 Bekhteevo, Sychyovsky Uyezd, Smolensk Governorate, Russian Empire
- Died: 29 July 1938 (aged 53) Moscow, Russian SFSR, Soviet Union
- Party: RSDLP (Bolsheviks) (1904–1918); Russian Communist Party (1918–1938)
- Spouse: Elena Rozmirovich
- Relations: Elena Krylenko (sister)
- Occupation: Lawyer, theorist, writer
- Awards: Order of Lenin; Order of the Red Banner

Military service
- Branch/service: Red Army
- Years of service: 1912—1913, 1916—1918
- Rank: Praporshchik
- Unit: Ryazan 69th Infantry Regiment
- Battles/wars: First World War

Nikolai Vasilyevich Krylenko (Russian: Никола́й Васи́льевич Крыле́нко, IPA: [krɨˈlʲenkə]; 2 May 1885 – 29 July 1938) was an Old Bolshevik and Soviet politician, military commander, and jurist. Krylenko served in a variety of posts in the Soviet legal system, rising to become People's Commissar for Justice and Prosecutor General of the Russian Soviet Federated Socialist Republic. He was executed during the Great Purge.

Krylenko was an exponent of socialist legality and the theory that political considerations, rather than criminal guilt or innocence, should guide the application of punishment. Although participating in the show trials and political repression of the late 1920s and early 1930s, and in the initial phase of the Great Purge, Krylenko was removed from his post as Commissar of Justice and arrested in January 1938. Following interrogation and torture by the NKVD, Krylenko confessed to extensive involvement in wrecking and anti-Soviet agitation. After a trial of 20 minutes, he was sentenced to death by the Military Collegium of the Soviet Supreme Court, and executed immediately afterwards.

Krylenko was posthumously rehabilitated in 1955.

== Biography ==
=== Early life and education ===
Krylenko was born in Bekhteyevo, in Sychyovsky Uyezd of Smolensk Governorate, the eldest of six children (two sons and four daughters) born to a populist revolutionary and his wife. His father, needing income to support his growing family, became a tax collector for the Tsarist government.

The young Krylenko joined the Bolshevik faction of the Russian Social Democratic Labor Party (RSDLP) in 1904 while studying history and literature at St. Petersburg University, where he was known to fellow students as Comrade Abram. He was a member of the short-lived Saint Petersburg Soviet during the Russian Revolution of 1905 and a member of the Bolshevik Saint Petersburg Committee. He was forced to flee Russia in June 1906, but returned later that year. Arrested by the Tsar's secret police in 1907, Krylenko was released for lack of evidence, but soon exiled to Lublin (present-day Poland) without trial.

Krylenko returned to Saint Petersburg in 1909 and finished his degree. He left the RSDLP in 1911, but soon rejoined it. He was drafted in 1912 and was promoted to second lieutenant before being discharged in 1913. After working as an assistant editor of Pravda and a liaison to the Bolshevik faction in the Duma for a few months, Krylenko was arrested again in 1913 and exiled to Kharkiv. There he studied and earned a law degree. In early 1914, Krylenko learned that he might be re-arrested and fled to Austria.

At the outbreak of the Great War in August 1914, where he was regarded as a member of an enemy nation, and moved to neutral Switzerland. In mid-1915, Vladimir Lenin sent Krylenko back to Russia to help rebuild the Bolshevik underground organization. In November 1915, Krylenko was arrested in Moscow for avoiding conscriptions and, after a few months in prison, sent to the South West Front in April 1916. During the war he attained the rank of ensign [praporshchik].

=== 1917 revolutions ===
After the February Revolution of 1917 and the introduction of elected committees in the Russian armed forces, Krylenko was elected chairman of his regiment's and then division's committee. On 15 April, he was elected chairman of the 11th Army's committee. After Lenin's return to Russia in April 1917, Krylenko adopted the new Bolshevik policy of irreconcilable opposition to the Provisional Government. He had to resign his post on 26 May 1917 for lack of support from non-Bolshevik members of the Army committee.

In June 1917, Krylenko was made a member of the Bolshevik Military Organization and was elected to the First All-Russian Congress of Soviets. At the Congress, he was elected to the permanent All-Russian Central Executive Committee from the Bolshevik faction. Krylenko left Petrograd for the High Command HQ in Mogilev on 2 July, but was arrested there by the Provisional government after the abortive July Days uprising. He was kept in prison in Petrograd, but was released in mid-September after the Kornilov Affair.

Krylenko took an active part in preparing the October Revolution of 1917 in Petrograd as newly elected chairman of the Congress of Northern Region Soviets and a leading member of the Military Revolutionary Committee. On 16 October, ten days before the uprising, he reported to the Bolshevik Central Committee that the Petrograd military would support the Bolsheviks in case of an uprising. During the Bolshevik takeover on 24–25 October (o.s.), Krylenko was one of the uprising's leaders, along with Leon Trotsky, Adolph Joffe, and Vladimir Antonov-Ovseenko.

=== Head of the Red Army ===
At the Second All Russian Congress of Soviets on 25 October, Krylenko was made a People's Commissar (minister) and member of a triumvirate (with Pavel Dybenko and Nikolai Podvoisky) responsible for military affairs. In early November (Old Style) 1917, immediately after the Bolshevik seizure of power, Krylenko helped Leon Trotsky suppress an attempt by Provisional Government loyalists, led by Alexander Kerensky and General Peter Krasnov, to retake Petrograd.

After the Provisional Commander in Chief (and Chief of General Staff), General Nikolai Dukhonin, refused to open peace negotiations with the Germans, Krylenko (an Ensign at this point) was appointed as Commander in Chief on 9 November. He started negotiations with representatives of the German army on 12–13 November. Krylenko arrived at the High Command HQ in Mogilev on 20 November and arrested General Dukhonin, who was bayoneted and shot to death by Red Guards answering to Krylenko. After the formation of the Red Army on 15 January [O.S. 2 January] 1918, Krylenko was a member of the All-Russian Collegium that oversaw its buildup. He proved to be an excellent public speaker, able to win over hostile mobs with words alone. His organizational talents, however, lagged far behind his oratorical ones.

Krylenko supported the policy of democratization of the Russian military, including abolishing subordination, providing for election of officers by enlisted men, and using propaganda to win over enemy units. Although the Red Army had some successes in early 1918 against small and poorly armed anti-Bolshevik detachments, the policy proved unsuccessful when Soviet forces were roundly defeated by the Imperial German Army in late February 1918 after the breakdown of the Brest-Litovsk negotiations.

In his 1918 essay Scythians?, Yevgeny Zamyatin, an Old Bolshevik who is now considered the first Soviet dissident cited Krylenko as an example of the ugliness and repression within the new Soviet Union. Zamyatin wrote, "Christ on Golgotha, between two thieves, bleeding to death drop by drop, is the victor – because he has been crucified, because, in practical terms, he has been vanquished. But Christ victorious in practical terms is the Grand Inquisitor. And worse, Christ victorious in practical terms is a paunchy priest in a silk-lined purple robe, who dispenses benedictions with his right hand and collects donations with his left. The Fair Lady, in legal marriage, is simply Mrs. So-and-So, with hair curlers at night and a migraine in the morning. And Marx, having come down to earth, is simply a Krylenko. Such is the irony and such is the wisdom of fate. Wisdom because this ironic law holds the pledge of eternal movement forward. The realization, materialisation, practical victory of an idea immediately gives it a philistine hue. And the true Scythian will smell from a mile away the odor of dwellings, the odor of cabbage soup, the odor of the priest in his purple cassock, the odor of Krylenko – and will hasten away from the dwellings, into the steppe, to freedom."

Later in the same essay, Zamyatin quoted a recent poem by Andrei Bely and used it to further criticize Krylenko and those like him, for having, "covered Russia with a pile of carcasses," and for, "dreaming of socialist–Napoleonic wars in Europe – throughout the world, throughout the universe! But let us not jest incautiously. Bely is honest, and did not intend to speak about the Krylenkos."

In the wake of the defeats, Trotsky pushed for the formation of a military council of former Russian generals that would function as a Red Army advisory body. Lenin and the Bolshevik Central Committee agreed to create a Supreme Military Council on 4 March, appointing Mikhail Bonch-Bruyevich, former chief of the imperial General Staff, as its head. At that point the entire Bolshevik leadership of the Red Army, including People's Commissar (defense minister) Nikolai Podvoisky and Krylenko, protested vigorously and eventually resigned. The office of the "Commander in Chief" was formally abolished by the Soviet government on 13 March, and Krylenko was reassigned to the Collegium of the Commissariat for Justice.

=== Revolutionary legality ===
From May 1918 and until 1922, Krylenko was Chairman of the Revolutionary Tribunal of the All-Russian Central Executive Committee. He simultaneously served as a member of the Collegium of Prosecutors of the Revolutionary Tribunal.

In May 1918, Leon Trotsky ordered that Soviet Navy Admiral Alexei Shchastny be put on trial for having refused to scuttle the Baltic Fleet. After a trial prosecuted by Krylenko, the presiding judge, Karklin, sentenced the Admiral, "To be shot within twenty four hours." Attendees reacted with dismay as Lenin had abolished the death penalty on 28 October 1917. Krylenko said to those present, "What are you worrying about? Executions have been abolished. But Shchastny is not being executed; he is being shot." The sentence was carried out soon after.

Krylenko was an enthusiastic proponent of the Red Terror, whatever his differences with the Cheka (the Soviet secret police), exclaiming, "We must execute not only the guilty. Execution of the innocent will impress the masses even more."

In early 1919, Krylenko was involved in a dispute with the Cheka and was instrumental in taking away its right to execute people without a trial. In 1922, Krylenko became Deputy Commissar of Justice and assistant Prosecutor General of the RSFSR, in which capacity he served as the chief prosecutor at the Moscow show trials of the 1920s.

From 1927 to 1934, Krylenko was a member of the Communist Party's discipline committee, the Central Control Commission.

=== Procurator of show trials ===
Throughout the 1920s and 1930s, Krykenko wrote dozens of books and articles in support of his philosophy of "socialist legality." According to Krylenko, political considerations rather than evidence needed to play the decisive role in deciding the verdict and sentence before trial. He further argued that even a confession obtained under torture constituted proof of a defendant's guilt; material evidence, precise definitions of a crime, or judicial sentencing guidelines were not needed under socialism.

Krylenko promoted his views on socialist legality during the work on two drafts of the Soviet Penal Code, one in 1930 and one in 1934. Krylenko's views were opposed by some Soviet theoreticians, including Soviet Prosecutor General Andrey Vyshinsky. According to Vyshinsky, Krylenko's imprecise definition of crimes and his refusal to define terms of punishment introduced legal instability and arbitrariness and were, therefore, against the interests of the Party. Their debates continued throughout 1935 and were inconclusive.

Krylenko was a prosecutor in a number of major show trials of the 1920s and early 1930s and was appointed State Procurator in 1928. Some major political trials prosecuted by Krylenko included the Trial of the Socialist Revolutionaries (1922), a trial of clergy portrayed as "The Tactical Center," alleged coal industry wreckers in the Shakhty Trial (1928), an alleged counterrevolutionary conspiracy in the Industrial Party Trial (1930), and an attack of political oppoenents in the Menshevik Trial (1931). In all of these political trials Krylenko sought severe penalties against defendants in the dock, up to the "supreme penalty" of execution.

In 1931 Krylenko became Commissar of Justice. He stepped down as Prosecutor General in 1932 and was replaced by Andrei Vyshinsky. In 1933, Krylenko was awarded the Order of Lenin.

=== Sport positions ===
In the 1930s, Krylenko headed the Soviet chess and checkers and mountain climbing associations. He was one of the pioneers of the Pamirs mountain climbing, leading the Soviet half of a joint Soviet–German expedition in 1928 as well as expeditions to the Eastern Pamirs in 1931 and to the Lenin Peak in 1934.

In 1935, Krylenko invited the former chess world champion Emanuel Lasker to the Soviet Union, where he settled until 1937.

=== Fall from power and execution ===
With the start of the Great Purge after Sergei Kirov's assassination on 1 December 1934, Krylenko's star began to fade and Stalin began to increasingly favor Vyshinsky. Notably, it was Vyshinsky and not Krylenko who prosecuted the first two high-profile Moscow show trials of Old Bolsheviks in August 1936 and January 1937. Krylenko's ally, the Marxist theoretician Eugen Pashukanis, was subjected to severe criticism in late 1936 and arrested in January 1937 and shot in September. Soon after Pashukanis's arrest, Krylenko was forced to publicly "admit his mistakes" and concede that Vyshinsky and his allies had been right all along.

Krylenko was promoted to Commissar of Justice of the USSR on 20 July 1936, and was directly involved in the first waves of Joseph Stalin's Great Purges between 1935 and 1938. However, at the first session of the newly reorganized Supreme Soviet of the Soviet Union in January 1938, he was denounced by an up-and-coming Stalinist, Mir Jafar Baghirov:

"Comrade Krylenko concerns himself only incidentally with the affairs of his commissariat. But to direct the Commissariat of Justice, great initiative and a serious attitude toward oneself is required. Whereas Comrade Krylenko used to spend a great deal of time on mountain-climbing and traveling, now he devotes a great deal of time to playing chess... We need to know what we are dealing with in the case of Comrade Krylenko—the commissar of justice? Or a mountain climber? I don't know which Comrade Krylenko thinks of himself as, but he is without doubt a poor people's commissar."

The attack had been carefully prepared in advance and Molotov endorsed it. In response, Stalin removed Krylenko from his post on 19 January 1938, turning the Commissariat over to his replacement, N. M. Rychkov. Leaving the Kremlin, Krylenko and his family traveled to his dacha outside Moscow. On the evening of 31 January 1938, Krylenko received a phone call from Stalin, who told him: "Don't get upset. We trust you. Keep doing the work you were assigned to on the new legal code." This phone call calmed Krylenko, but later that evening his home was raided by an NKVD squad. Krylenko and his family were arrested.

After three days of interrogation and torture by the NKVD, Krylenko "confessed" that he had been a "wrecker" since 1930. On 3 April, he made an additional statement, claiming to have been an enemy of Lenin before the October Revolution. During his last interrogation on 28 June 1938, Krylenko named thirty Commissariat of Justice officials whom he had allegedly recruited into an anti-Soviet conspiracy, including Vladimir Antonov-Ovseyenko.

Nikolai Krylenko was tried by the Military Collegium of the Soviet Supreme Court on 29 July 1938. In accordance with Krylenko's own theories of socialist legality, the verdict and sentence had been decided in advance. The trial lasted only twenty minutes, just long enough for Krylenko to retract his false confessions. After being found guilty, he was taken away and immediately shot once in the back of the head.

=== Legacy ===
The NKVD officer who had taken Krylenko's testimony, one Kogan, probably Captain Lazar V. Kogan, who also interrogated Nikolai Bukharin and Genrikh Yagoda, was, in turn, shot in 1939 (probably, on 2 March) for "anti-Soviet activity". Krylenko's conviction was one of the first annulled by the Soviet State in 1955, during the Khrushchev thaw and he was posthumously rehabilitated, with civil benefits restored to his survivors.

Krylenko's ex-wife and fellow Old Bolshevik Elena Rozmirovich survived the purges by keeping a low profile and working in the Party archives.

His sister Elena Krylenko worked for Maxim Litvinov in the Ministry for Foreign Affairs (although she was never a member of the Party); in 1924 she decided to leave Russia with the American writer Max Eastman (who had been in Russia for almost two years, researching and writing a life of Trotsky). To enable her to leave, Litvinov agreed to pass her off as a member of his delegation when he travelled to London for an international conference. But she could not leave the delegation and remain abroad without a passport, which the Bolsheviks would not give her. So, in the hours before their train left, she and Max Eastman got married. They were still married and living in America when she died in 1956.

Furthermore, Krylenko's creation of what was later dubbed "The Soviet Chess Machine" led Soviet Grandmasters to dominate the World Chess Championship for most of the remainder of the 20th century, producing a string of World Chess Champions including Mikhail Botvinnik, Vasily Smyslov, Mikhail Tal, Tigran Petrosian, Boris Spassky, Anatoly Karpov, and Garry Kasparov.

== Works (in English) ==
Note: For an extensive list of works in Russian, see Russian Wikipedia — bibliography

- Red and White Terror. London: Communist Party of Great Britain, 1928.
- A Blow at Intervention: Final Indictment in the Case of the Counter-revolutionary Organisation of the Union of Engineers’ Organisations (the Industrial Party) whereby Ramzin, Kalinnikof, Larichef, Charnowsky, Fedotof, Kupriyanof, Ochkin and Sitnin, the Accused, Are Charged in Accordance with Article 58, paragraphs 3, 4, and 6 of the Criminal Code of the RSFSR. Moscow, State Publishers, 1931.
- Revolutionary Law. Moscow: Co-operative Publishing Society of Foreign Workers in the USSR, 1933.

== See also ==
- Outline of the Russian Revolution and Civil War
- Bibliography of the Russian Revolution and Civil War
- Bibliography of Stalinism and the Soviet Union
- Index of Old Bolsheviks
- Index of articles related to the Russian Revolution and Civil War
