= Alexander Vinokurov (politician) =

Soviet statesman

- Александр Винокуров

Chairman of the Supreme Court of the Soviet Union
- In office January 11, 1924 – August 17, 1938
- Preceded by: Nikolay Krylenko
- Succeeded by: Ivan Golyakov

People's Commissar of Social Security of the Russian Socialist Federative Soviet Republic
- In office April 16, 1920 – June 30, 1921
- Preceded by: Office established Himself as the People's Commissar of State Charity – Social Security of the Russian Socialist Federative Soviet Republic
- Succeeded by: Nikolay Milyutin

People's Commissar for State Charity – Social Security of the Russian Socialist Federative Soviet Republic
- In office March 20, 1918 – November 4, 1919
- Prime Minister: Vladimir Lenin
- Preceded by: Alexandra Kollontai
- Succeeded by: Office abolished Himself as People's Commissar of Social Security of the Russian Socialist Federative Soviet Republic

Personal details
- Born: August 9, 1869 Yekaterinoslav, Russian Empire
- Died: November 9, 1944 (aged 75) Moscow, Russian Soviet Federative Socialist Republic, Soviet Union
- Resting place: Novodevichy Cemetery
- Party: Russian Social Democratic Labour Party; All–Union Communist Party (Bolsheviks)
- Education: Faculty of Medicine, Moscow University

Alexander Nikolaevich Vinokurov (Russian: Алекса́ндр Никола́евич Виноку́ров; August 9, 1869 – November 9, 1944) was a Soviet statesman. Member of the All–Russian Central Executive Committee and the Central Executive Committee of the Soviet Union. Chairman of the Supreme Court of the Soviet Union (1924–1938).

== Biography ==
Born into the family of a financial officer, Vinokurov was educated at the Yekaterinoslav Gymnasium, which he graduated in 1888 and entered the Medical Faculty of Moscow University.

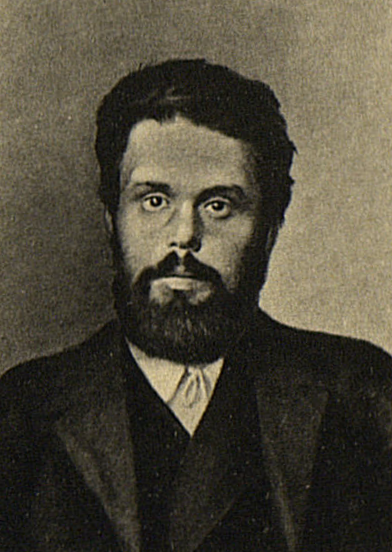
Alexander Vinokurov, 1890s

From 1890 he was a member of the revolutionary movement. In 1893 he was one of the founders of the Moscow, and in 1895 of the Yekaterinoslav Social Democratic organizations. Vinokurov became a member of the Russian Social Democratic Labour Party in 1898 and joined its Bolshevik wing in 1903.

In connection with the failure of the Moscow group of Social Democrats, he was arrested, spent two years in solitary confinement, and in from 1897 to 1902, in exile. Then, from 1905 was involved at party work in Yekaterinoslav and from 1908 in Saint Petersburg. From 1913 to 1917 he was one of the editors of the magazine "Insurance Questions". In 1917 he served as a deputy of the Petrograd State Duma, and since October the Chairman of the First Bolshevik Petrograd State Duma. After the October Revolution, a member of the collegium of the People's Commissariat of Labour of the Russian Socialist Federative Soviet Republic.

From 1918 to 1921 he served as People's Commissar of Social Security of the Russian Socialist Federative Soviet Republic. From 1921 to 1923, he worked as a member of the Famine Relief Commission, then the commission to Combat the Effects of Famine.

Aleksandr Vinokurov (center) and Bishop Antonin (Granovsky) (left), representing Aid to the Famine, familiarize themselves with measures to protect confiscated church valuables – Kino–Pravda, 1922

From 1924 to 1938 Vinokurov Chairman of the Supreme Court of the Soviet Union. He participated in the struggle for control over the justice authorities with Vyshinsky and Krylenko.

In 1938, he was dismissed from his post and appointed Head of the Health Education Department of the People's Commissariat of Health of the Soviet Union.

He was cremated, buried in the old territory of the Novodevichy Cemetery in the wall of the monastery.

== Participation in mass repressions ==
As the Chairman of the Supreme Court of the Soviet Union, he is directly responsible for participating in mass repressions in the Soviet Union. According to archival materials (the fund of the Supreme Court of the Soviet Union in the State Archives of the Russian Federation), he tried to minimize mass repressions as much as possible. He was a supporter of the rule of law in the work of Soviet courts.

== Perpetuation of memory ==
In 1963, Moscow's 3rd Cheryomushkinsky Lane was renamed Vinokurov Street.
