= Alexander Gorkin =

Senior Soviet official

- Александр Горкин
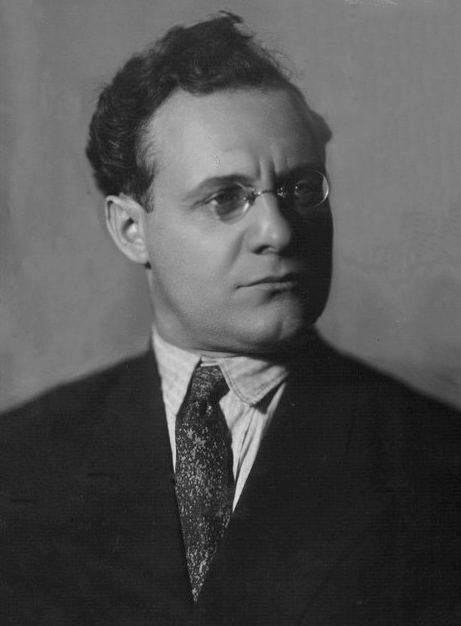
- Gorkin in 1938

Chairman of the Supreme Court of the Soviet Union
- In office February 12, 1957 – September 20, 1972
- Preceded by: Anatoly Volin
- Succeeded by: Lev Smirnov

Chairman of the Central Audit Commission of the Communist Party of the Soviet Union
- In office February 3, 1959 – October 17, 1961
- Preceded by: Peter Moskatov
- Succeeded by: Nonna Muravyova

Secretary of the Presidium of the Supreme Council of the Soviet Union
- In office January 15, 1938 – March 15, 1954
- Preceded by: Office established
- Succeeded by: Nikolai Pegov
- In office July 16, 1956 – February 12, 1957
- Preceded by: Nikolai Pegov
- Succeeded by: Mikheil Giorgadze

First Secretary of the Orenburg Regional Committee of the All-Union Communist Party (Bolsheviks)
- In office December 20, 1934 – July 11, 1937
- Preceded by: Office established
- Succeeded by: Peter Mitrofanov

Personal details
- Born: September 5, 1897 Rameshki Village, Bezhetsky Uyezd, Tver Governorate, Russian Empire
- Died: June 29, 1988 (aged 90) Moscow, Russian Soviet Federative Socialist Republic, Soviet Union
- Resting place: Novodevichy Cemetery
- Party: Russian Communist Party (1916–1974)
- Children: 2
- Education: Institute of Red Professors (1 year)
- Awards: Hero of Socialist Labour; Order of Lenin; Order of the October Revolution; Order of the Red Banner of Labour; Order of Friendship of Peoples; Order of the Badge of Honour
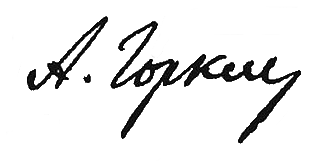
- Signature

Alexander Fyodorovich Gorkin (Russian: Александр Фёдорович Горкин; September 5, 1897 – June 29, 1988) was a Soviet state and party leader, Secretary of the Presidium of the Supreme Soviet of the Soviet Union (1938–1953 and 1956–1957), Hero of Socialist Labour (1967).

== Biography ==
Gorkin was born into a Russian peasant family. In 1916, he joined the Bolsheviks. In 1917, he graduated from the Tver Gymnasium. From August 1917 to June 1919, he was Secretary of the Tver City Council of Deputies, and from December 1918 to February 1919 he was Chairman of the Provincial Executive Committee. In 1919, he became a member of the Board of the Kursk Gubernatorial Extraordinary Commission, and the head of the Penza Gubernatorial Village Department and out-of-school subdivision. In 1920–1921, he did political work for the Red Army.

In 1921–1933, he was an employee of the Tver Gubernatorial Committee of the Russian Communist Party (Bolsheviks), the Kyrgyz Regional Committee of the Russian Communist Party (Bolsheviks), the Orenburg Gubernatorial Committee of the Russian Communist Party (Bolsheviks), the Agricultural Union, the Poultry and Water Union, the Middle Volga Regional Committee of the All-Union Communist Party (Bolsheviks), apparatus of the Central Committee of the All-Union Communist Party (Bolsheviks). In 1931–1932, he studied at the Agrarian Faculty of the Institute of Red Professors in Moscow. In 1933–1934, the Second Secretary of the Middle Volga Regional Committee of the All-Union Communist Party (Bolsheviks) in Samara.

From December 1934 to July 1937, he was the First Secretary of the newly created Orenburg Regional Committee of the All-Union Communist Party (Bolsheviks). During this period, mass repressions took place in the Orenburg Oblast, during which, in particular, all members of the Bureau of the Regional Committee of the All-Union Communist Party (Bolsheviks) were killed.

From July 9, 1937 to January 1938 he was Secretary of the Central Executive Committee of the Soviet Union. In 1938–1953 and 1956–1957 he was Secretary of the Presidium of the Supreme Soviet of the Soviet Union (from March 15, 1953 to July 15, 1956 this position was held by Nikolai Pegov, and Gorkin was deputy). He was a member of the Supreme Soviet of the Soviet Union of the 1–8th convocations (1937–1974).

In 1957–1972 he was Chairman of the Supreme Court of the Soviet Union, simultaneously in 1959–1961 he was Chairman of the Central Audit Commission of the Communist Party of the Soviet Union. He participated in a campaign for the rehabilitation of victims of personality cult.

He was a delegate to the 8–10, 15, 17–24 Congresses of the All-Union Communist Party (Bolsheviks) and the Communist Party of the Soviet Union. A Candidate Member of the Central Committee of the All-Union Communist Party (Bolsheviks) (1939–1952), a member of the Central Audit Commission of the Communist Party of the Soviet Union (1952–1976).

After 1972 he was a personal pensioner. He lived in Moscow. He was buried at the Novodevichy Cemetery.

== Family ==
The son, Yuri Alexandrovich Gorkin (born in 1921), a participant in the Great Patriotic War, was awarded orders and medals. He graduated with honors from the Moscow Higher Technical School named after Nikolai Bauman with a degree in radio electronics. Director of the Research Institute of Biotechnology, Doctor of Technical Sciences, Professor. Wife, Nadezhda Nikolaevna Gorkina, artist-architect, restorer.

Daughter, Olga Yuryevna Gorkina, journalist, art critic, television producer.

Daughter, Maya Alexandrovna Gorkina (born in 1930) was married to an intelligence officer of the Main Intelligence Directorate, resident in Norway and the United Kingdom, Yevgeny Ivanov (1926–1994), involved in a scandal with a lover of the British Minister of War, John Profumo, a 19-year-old dancer and Model Christine Keeler.

== Awards ==
- Hero of Socialist Labour (September 4, 1967);
- Three Orders of Lenin (September 4, 1947; September 4, 1957; September 4, 1967);
- Order of the October Revolution (August 31, 1971);
- Order of the Red Banner of Labour (September 2, 1977);
- Order of Friendship of Peoples (September 3, 1982);
- Order of the Badge of Honour (September 4, 1987);
- Medals.
