= Alexander Rekunkov =

- Александр Рекунков
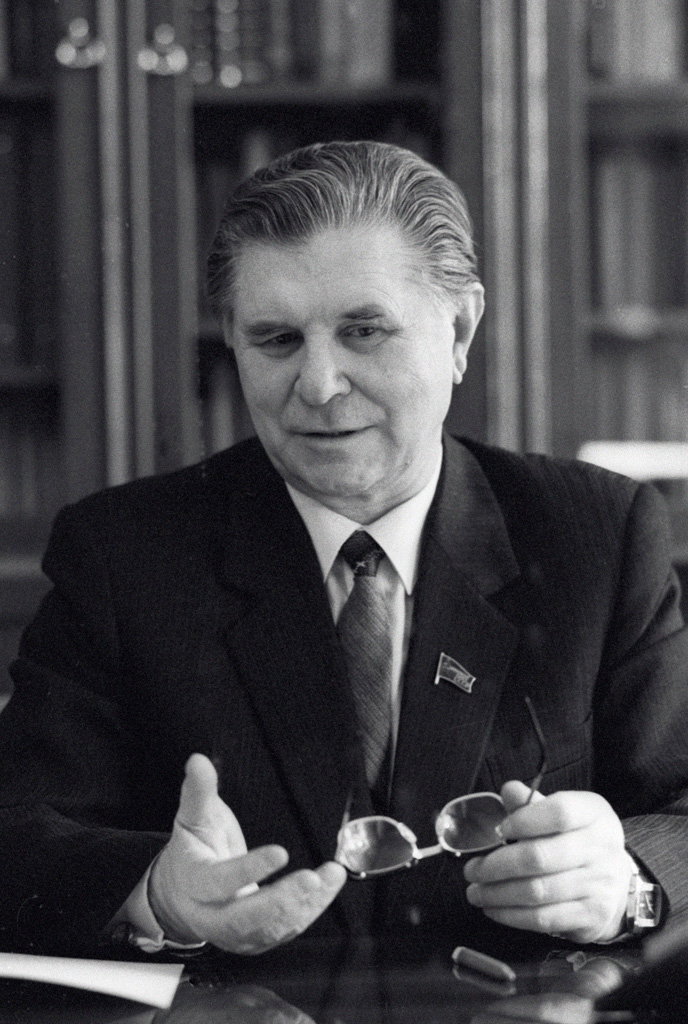
- Rekunkov in 1985

Procurator General of the Soviet Union
- In office 1981–1988
- Preceded by: Roman Rudenko
- Succeeded by: Aleksandr Sukharev

Personal details
- Born: 27 October 1920 Stogovsky, Don Oblast, RSFSR
- Died: 23 May 1996 (aged 75) Moscow, Russia
- Party: Communist Party of the Soviet Union
- Profession: Lawyer, civil servant

Alexander Mikhailovich Rekunkov (Russian: Александр Михайлович Рекунков; 27 October 1920 – 23 May 1996) was a Soviet and Russian lawyer who served as Procurator General of the Soviet Union from 1981 to 1988.

== Biography ==
He was born on the Stogovsky khutor (now Verkhne-Don District of Rostov Oblast) into a peasant family.

After finishing school in 1939, he entered the Tbilisi Mining Artillery School named after the 26 Baku Commissars. In October 1941, he was appointed an instructor of universal military training at the Verkhne-Don Military Commissariat.

From February 1944, he fought in the 336th Guards Rifle Regiment of the 120th Guards Rifle Division, which was part of the 3rd Army of the 2nd Belorussian Front. He commanded a platoon, a company, and a battalion.

In February 1945, he was severely wounded. After being discharged from hospital, he was assigned to work in the prosecutor's office and appointed Assistant Prosecutor of the Verkhne-Don District of Rostov Oblast. From the very beginning of his work in the prosecution service, A. M. Rekunkov acutely felt the lack of professional knowledge, so almost immediately after his appointment, he enrolled in a three-month course at the Rostov Law School in Taganrog.

From 1946 — Assistant Prosecutor of the Tselinsky District of Rostov Oblast.

From 1947 — Prosecutor of the Konstantinovsky District of Rostov Oblast.

From 1952 — Prosecutor of the Azov District of Rostov Oblast.

Without leaving work, he studied at courses at the Rostov Law School and, from 1946 to 1952, at the Rostov branch of the All-Union Law Correspondence Institute, which he graduated from with honors.

From 1958 — First Deputy Prosecutor, and from 1960 — Prosecutor of Bryansk Oblast.

From 1966 — Prosecutor of Voronezh Oblast.

From 1971 — First Deputy Prosecutor of the RSFSR.

From 1976 — First Deputy Prosecutor General of the USSR.

In 1980, he announced to Andrei D. Sakharov the decision of the Supreme Soviet of the USSR to deprive him of government awards and to exile him to Gorky.
