= Mikhail Pankratyev =

Soviet statesman

- Михаил Панкратьев

3rd Prosecutor of the Soviet Union
- In office May 31, 1939 – August 7, 1940
- Preceded by: Andrey Vyshinsky
- Succeeded by: Victor Bochkov

9th Prosecutor of the Russian Soviet Federative Socialist Republic
- In office May 20, 1938 – May 31, 1939
- Preceded by: Ivan Golyakov
- Succeeded by: Anatoly Volin

Personal details
- Born: November 4, 1901 Kablukovo, Bezhetsk Uyezd, Tver Governorate, Russian Empire
- Died: September 23, 1974 (aged 72) Moscow, Soviet Union
- Party: Communist Party of the Soviet Union (1920–1974)
- Awards: Order of Lenin; Order of the Red Banner

Mikhail Ivanovich Pankratyev (November 4, 1901 – September 23, 1974) was a Soviet statesman. Deputy of the Supreme Soviet of the Russian Soviet Federative Socialist Republic of the 1st Convocation. Major General of Justice.

== Biography ==
- From April 1917 to September 1918, a loader of the Moscow Vindavo–Rybinsk Railway;
- From September 1918, he was a clerk of the Bezhetsk Uyezd Food Committee;
- From March 1920 to May 1921, he headed the Accounting and Organizational Department of the Bezhetsk District Committee of the Russian Communist Party (Bolsheviks);
- From May 1921 to November 1922, instructor and Head of the Organizational Unit of the Political Department of the 27th Division;
- From November 1922 to September 1923, Commissar of the 81st Infantry Regiment, and from September 1923, Commissar of the Headquarters of the 8th Infantry Division. From January 1925 to November 1925, Commissar of the 22nd Regiment of the 8th Division. From November 1925 to November 1926, Commissar of the Regiment of Armored Trains. From December 1925 to November 1929, Commissioner of the 110th Infantry Regiment;
- Since 1929, in the prosecutor's office. From November 1929, he was assistant to the military prosecutor of the Azerbaijan Division. From January 1930, assistant military attorney for the corps. From April 1932 to March 1933, the Military Prosecutor of the Railway Brigade Directorate;
- In March 1933, he was transferred to the Chief Military Prosecutor's Office of the Workers' and Peasants' Red Army: prosecutor of a department, assistant to the chief military prosecutor, and head of a department;
- From May 1938 to May 1939, he was the Prosecutor of the Russian Soviet Federative Socialist Republic. From May 1939 to August 1940, he was the Prosecutor of the Soviet Union;

In this position, he came into conflict with Lavrenty Beria, in particular, advocated the continuation of repressions and twice wrote memoranda to the leadership on the inadmissibility of terminating cases against "enemies of the people". Was removed from office for an unsuccessful start of the campaign to combat labor crimes (Decree of the Presidium of the Supreme Soviet of the Soviet Union of June 26, 1940). The "Case" of Pankratyev and Rychkov (People's Commissar of Justice of the Soviet Union) was considered at the end of July 1940 at a meeting of the Political Bureau of the Central Committee of the All–Union Communist Party (Bolsheviks).

- From October 1940 to March 1942, deputy Head of the Military Tribunals Department of the People's Commissariat of Justice of the Soviet Union;
- From April 1942 to October 1943, Chairman of the Military Tribunal of the Bryansk Front;
- Since October 1943, Chairman of the Military Tribunal of the 2nd Baltic Front. He was the Chairman of the Riga Trial in 1946;
- From May 1945 to October 1950, Chairman of the Military Tribunal of the Baltic Military District.

After retirement he worked in the Voluntary Society for Assistance to the Army, Aviation and Navy.
