= Foreign Legal Collegium =

Legal aid organisation

Inyurkollegiya or Injurkollegija (Russian: Инюрколлегия, Иностранная юридическая коллегия, Foreign Legal Collegium) was a Soviet legal aid organisation that specialized in international law and was established in 1937.

The organization provided legal aid for Soviet citizens and organisations in foreign civil cases. The Soviet side abroad was represented via hired foreign lawyers who had the right to represent foreigners in their states.

It also represented foreign citizens and organisations in civil cases in the Soviet Union.

In addition to legal aid, Inyurkollegiya provided assistance in obtaining various kinds of information, searching of documents and consulting in Soviet and foreign laws.

== Russian Federation ==
In the aftermath of the fall of Soviet Union, the organisation was reorganised into Iniurcolleguia, a law firm.

== Notable members ==
- Vladimir Zhirinovsky
- Rein Lang
