= People's Court (Soviet Union) =

Court of first instance in the Soviet Union

A people's court in the late Soviet Union was a court of first instance which handled the majority of civil and criminal offenses, as well as certain administrative law offenses.

The people's court handled cases by a collegium consisting of a people's judge and two people's assessors (Russian: народный судья, народные заседатели)Рядом с судьями посадят авторитетных граждан. Но что это значит? The people's assessors had duties similar to jurors, but decided both any objections and the verdict along with the judge, unlike in most jury systems.

In early Soviet Russia and Soviet Union the term "people's court" was used in reference to any court in the new Soviet legal system which replaced the legal system of the Russian Empire. At these times there were several levels of courts, according to the administrative division of the country: local, okrug, and oblast people's courts.

== See also ==
- Procurator General of the USSR
- Supreme Court of the USSR
- Ministry of Justice of the USSR
