= Ivan Golyakov =

Chairman of the Supreme Court of the USSR in 1938 - 1948

- Иван Голяков
- Golyakov in 1960

3rd Chairman of the Supreme Court of the Soviet Union
- In office August 17, 1938 – August 25, 1948
- Preceded by: Alexander Vinokurov
- Succeeded by: Anatoly Volin

8th Prosecutor of the Russian Soviet Federative Socialist Republic
- In office January 31, 1938 – April 14, 1938
- Preceded by: Nikolay Rychkov
- Succeeded by: Mikhail Pankratyev

Personal details
- Born: July 6, 1888 Peshkovo Village, Dmitrov Uyezd, Moscow Governorate, Russian Empire
- Died: March 18, 1961 (aged 72) Moscow, Russian Soviet Federative Socialist Republic, Soviet Union
- Resting place: Novodevichye Cemetery
- Party: Russian Social Democratic Labor Party (Bolsheviks) – Russian Communist Party (Bolsheviks) – All–Union Communist Party (Bolsheviks) since 1918
- Education: North Caucasus University
- Occupation: All–Union Institute of Legal Sciences
- Profession: Lawyer
- Awards: Order of Lenin; Order of the Red Banner; Order of the Red Banner of Labour

Ivan Terentyevich Golyakov (July 6, 1888 (according to other sources: June 6), – March 18, 1961) was a figure in the Soviet prosecutor's office and court. Chairman of the Supreme Court of the Soviet Union (1938–1948). One of the organizers of the Stalinist Repressions.

== Biography ==
Born into a peasant family. From November 1909 to April 1913, he served as a private in the Kexholm Regiment in Warsaw. In 1914–1918 – on the fronts of the First World War, he was a private and junior non–commissioned officer. After the February Revolution, in April 1917, he entered the Army Council of Soldiers' Deputies. In March 1918, he returned to his native village. For some time he was the head of the rural consumer society.

In 1918, he joined the ranks of the Russian Social Democratic Labor Party (Bolsheviks), created a party cell in the countryside and took the post of secretary in it. Then he was elected Chairman of the executive committee of the Obolyanovo Volost Council.

Since May 1919, he has been a volunteer in the Red Army. He took part in the Civil War: he served as a Red Army soldier, then – as a political worker in the 9th Army of the South–Eastern Front. Military Commissar in the 1st Caucasian Red Wild Cavalry Division. From 1919 to 1925, he was the Chairman of the Revolutionary Military Tribunal of the 14th Infantry Division of the 9th Army, Don Region, a member of the Collegium of the Military Tribunal of the North Caucasian Military District.

In 1925, he graduated from the Legal Department of the Faculty of Social Sciences of the North Caucasus University with a degree in criminology. In 1931, he received a certificate of the commander of the Red Army and at the same time completed advanced training courses for the highest commanding staff of the Workers' and Peasants' Red Army.

In 1925–1933 – Deputy Chairman of the Revolutionary Military Tribunal of the Belorussian Military District, since March 1931 – member of the Military Collegium of the Supreme Court of the Soviet Union.

January–April 1938 – Prosecutor of the Russian Soviet Federative Socialist Republic.

In 1938–1948 – Chairman of the Supreme Court of the Soviet Union. In August 1948, by decision of the Political Bureau, the Chairman of the Supreme Court of the Soviet Union was dismissed for shortcomings in his work, in particular for "facts of malignant use of official position by some members of the Supreme Court of the Soviet Union and employees of its apparatus".

He was elected as a deputy of the Supreme Soviet of the Soviet Union of the 2nd Convocation, a deputy of the Supreme Soviet of the Russian Soviet Federative Socialist Republic of the 1st Convocation.

From 1932 to 1959, he worked at the All–Union Institute of Legal Sciences as deputy director for Scientific Affairs, and in 1938–1947 and 1949–1956 – as Director of the institute. He edited the "Library of the People's Judge and People's Assessor" (by 1945, more than 40 collections had been published).

Professor (1940). He was a lecturer at Moscow State University, Moscow Law Institute and the All–Union Correspondence Law Institute. Author of over 70 scientific monographs.

Retired since 1959.

Collected a large library of fiction, legal and other literature. He was the publisher of the unique research "Court and Law in Fiction" (1959). Aleksandr Solzhenitsyn notes that he "knew the work of Tolstoi, Korolenko, and Chekhov."

Buried at the Novodevichy Cemetery.

== Participation in mass repressions ==
According to archival materials (the fund of the Supreme Court of the Soviet Union in the State Archives of the Russian Federation), he tried to avoid active participation in the consideration of counter–revolutionary cases. During the periods of "legality" (1938–1940, 1944–1947) he sought to rehabilitate the maximum possible number of convicts.

He was a member of the secret commission of the Political Bureau of the Central Committee of the All–Union Communist Party (Bolsheviks) on court cases. The Commission approved all death sentences in the Soviet Union.

== Awards and titles ==
- 2 Orders of Lenin (1944, 1945);
- Order of the Red Banner;
- Order of the Red Banner of Labour;
- Medals.
