= Supreme Court of the Soviet Union =

Supreme judicial organ of the USSR (1923–1992)

Supreme Court of the Union of Soviet Socialist Republics
- Верховный Суд Союз Советских Социалистических Республик
- Established: 23 November 1923
- Dissolved: 2 January 1992
- Location: Moscow, Russian Soviet Federative Socialist Republic, Soviet Union
- Composition method: Presidential selection with Supreme Soviet approval
- Authorised by: Constitution of the Soviet Union
- Judge term length: 5 years

The Supreme Court of the Soviet Union, officially the Supreme Court of the USSR (Russian: Верховный Суд СССР) was the supreme judicial organ of the Soviet Union during its existence. It was established on November 23, 1923 and was dissolved on January 2, 1992. The Supreme Court of the USSR included a Military Collegium and other elements which were not typical of supreme courts found in other countries, then or now. Its role, power and function evolved throughout the history of the USSR. The first chairman of the Supreme Court was Nikolai Krylenko.

== History ==
=== Creation of the Supreme Court of the Soviet Union ===
Article 12 of the Treaty on the Creation of the Union of Soviet Socialist Republics articulated the functions of the Supreme Court of the Soviet Union "with the functions of supreme judicial control" under the Central Executive Committee of the Soviet Union. Therefore, the question of the need to create a Supreme Court arose after the Soviet Union was established.

On November 23, 1923, the Statute on the USSR Supreme Court officially established the Supreme Court of the Soviet Union. Although it only had its first plenary session on April 19, 1924, in which organisation, measures, and forms of activity for the Court were discussed.

The 1924 Constitution of the Soviet Union codified the existence of the Supreme Court of the Soviet Union constitutionally.

=== Lenin era ===
When the Soviet legal system was established, it was intended to serve the proletariat through the Communist Party. To assure this would be the case, the Communist Party packed the courts with loyal and trusted party members. Complications arose from this court packing as many Soviet jurists lacked legal training or judicial experience, a situation that led to a large number of appeals. The USSR Supreme Court played a limited role in regular legal affairs, as per the 1924 Constitution of the Soviet Union, meaning that appellate cases from the Soviet Republic courts could not be appealed to the USSR Supreme Court, only the Republic Supreme Courts. The Supreme Court was consequently limited to cases from military tribunals. Republic courts could issue policy directives, whereas the USSR Supreme Court could only do so in relation to Soviet law.

The primary role of the USSR Supreme Court was constitutional review. The Supreme Court assessed Republic law to ensure consistency with Soviet law, at the behest of Central Executive Committee of the Soviet Union. It mostly served an advisory role, as it was the duty of the Central Executive Committee to act upon the court's interpretation.

=== Stalin era ===
In 1929, the constitutional activity of the Supreme Court ended. Stalin's collectivisation programs led to the simplification of the legal system and legal norms; courts were expected to serve political goals. The attention of the USSR Supreme Court was directed towards monitoring lower courts. In 1934, the USSR Supreme Court gained the legal authority to issue instructions, obtain reports, and conduct surveys of lower courts.

During Stalin's purges, charges were brought in various courts, including provincial courts, Republic Courts and the USSR Supreme Court. Eventually, in 1938 almost all members of the USSR Supreme Court were purged; most were sent to labor camps. Stalin installed new judges in the USSR Supreme Court, who were given significantly more power under the 1936 Constitution of the Soviet Union. The USSR Supreme Court was empowered to examine provincial court cases, thus bypassing republic level supreme courts.

=== Post-Stalin era ===
During de-Stalinization, Soviet criminal law from the Stalin era was revised, including the elimination of harsh penalties for labor infractions, abortion, and petty theft. In 1957, Khrushchev with an agenda of decentralisation of governmental authority, eliminated the appellate jurisdiction the USSR Supreme Court had over other courts. Instead of the Supreme Court being allowed review case decisions from any court, it was reduced to its most basic role outlined in the 1936 Constitution, of supervising whether decisions taken by republic level supreme courts conflicted with Soviet law. The diminished work of the USSR Supreme Court called for it to be reduced in size. Thus, in the same year of 1957, the Supreme Court was reconstituted with 12 judges, which included the chief justice and his two deputies; the Supreme Court could be expanded, reconstituted, and reduced in size by vote of the Supreme Soviet of the Soviet Union. Potential nominees had to pass the scrutiny of the Chairman of the Supreme Court and the Minister of Justice. Later in 1962, the Court instituted a Scientific Advisory Council, which introduced legal scholars into the process of formulating judicial directives as consultants.

=== Gorbachev era ===
Gorbachev's policies of reform allowed for the press and jurists to expose the abuses in the Soviet administration of justice. This was to also to start a movement for judicial reform. The USSR Supreme Court contributed to the legitimisation of Gorbachev's reforms, not just purely in justice, as it played a role in reintroducing the arts that Stalin once repressed. Additionally, political leaders whom were initially purged or condemned by the Soviet Union, were revived by Supreme Court investigations. Most notably, it found that Bukharin's ruling was no longer law. From 1985 to 1987, the USSR Supreme Court rehabilitated 240 people from the Stalin era.

It was proposed that the constitutional functions of the USSR Supreme Court would be returned, chiefly in relation to the instructions and directives of bureaucratic agencies. This was not a new, as it was previously in discussion for the 1977 Constitution of the Soviet Union.

=== Dissolution of the Supreme Court of the Soviet Union ===
After the dissolution of the Soviet Union, the Presidium of the Supreme Soviet of the RSFSR created a resolution on December 28, 1991, which was to abolish the Supreme Court of the Soviet Union by January 2, 1992. This was part of the policy to abolish the remaining organs of the Soviet Union.

The successor institution of the Supreme Court of the Soviet Union became both the Economic Court of the Commonwealth of Independent States and the Supreme Court of the RSFSR within the Russian territory. Liquidation commissions were established as part of this process to facilitate the Supreme Court's abolition. The final act dismissed employees of the Supreme Court.

== Chairmen ==
No.	Portrait	Name	Took office	Left office	Time in office
1	Nikolai Krylenko	Nikolai Krylenko (1885–1938)	28 November 1923	2 February 1924	66 days
2	Alexander Vinokurov	Alexander Vinokurov (1869–1944)	11 January 1924	17 August 1938	14 years, 218 days
3	Ivan Golyakov	Ivan Golyakov (1888–1961)	17 August 1938	25 August 1948	10 years, 8 days
4	Anatoly Volin	Anatoly Volin (1903–2007)	25 August 1948	12 February 1957	8 years, 171 days
5	Alexander Gorkin	Alexander Gorkin (1897–1988)	12 February 1957	20 September 1972	15 years, 221 days
6	Lev Smirnov	Lev Smirnov (1911–1986)	20 September 1972	12 April 1984	11 years, 205 days
7	Vladimir Terebilov	Vladimir Terebilov (1916–2004)	23 April 1984	12 April 1989	4 years, 354 days
8	Evgeniy Smolentsev [ru]	Evgeniy Smolentsev (1923–2017)	7 June 1989	2 January 1992	2 years, 209 days

== See also ==
- Military Collegium of the Supreme Court of the USSR
- Ministry of Justice of the USSR
- People's Court of the USSR
- Procurator General of the USSR
