= Public procurator =

Officer of state who investigates and prosecutes crime in some continental jurisdictions

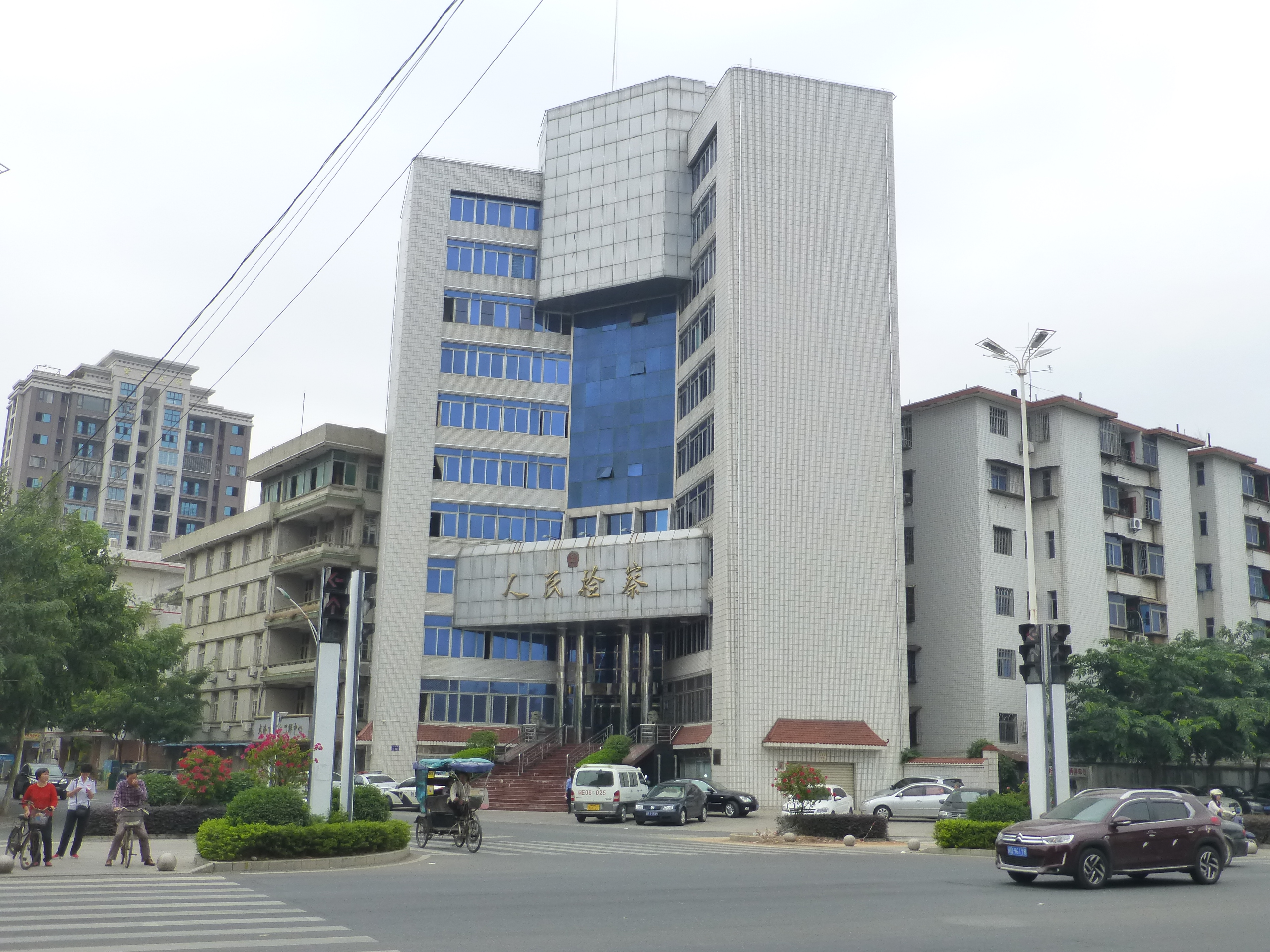
Longhai Municipal People's Procurate (中华人民共和国福建省龙海市人民检察院)

A public procurator (Chinese: 公诉人; 检察官) is an officer of a state charged with both the investigation and prosecution of crime. The office is a feature of a civil law inquisitorial rather than common law adversarial system. Countries such as Japan, China, Russia, Indonesia and Lithuania adopt the procuratorial system.

The office of a procurator is called a procuracy or procuratorate. The terms are from Latin and originate with the procurators of the Roman Empire.
