= Nikolay Rychkov =

Soviet statesman and lawyer (1897-1959)

- Николай Рычков
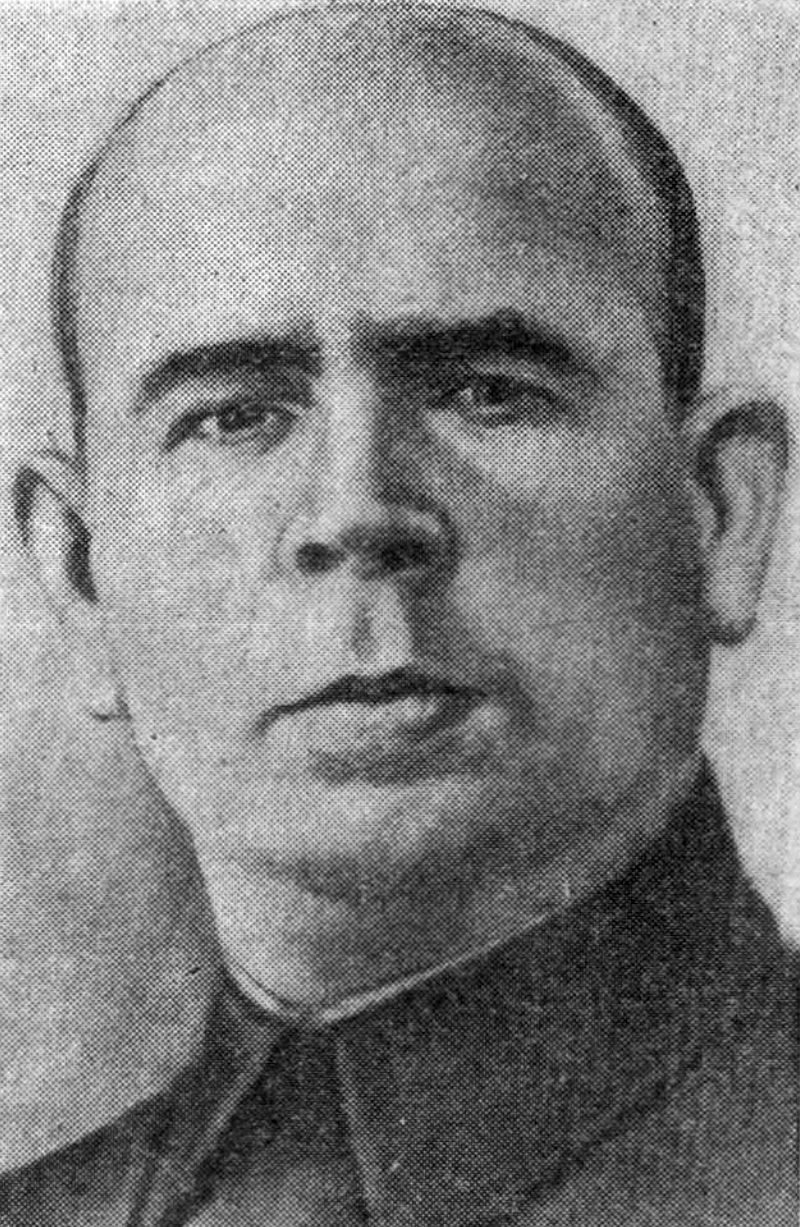
- Rychkov in 1938

People's Commissar of Justice of the Soviet Union
- In office 19 January 1938 – 15 March 1946
- Preceded by: Nikolay Krylenko
- Succeeded by: Office abolished Himself as Minister of Justice of the Soviet Union

Minister of Justice of the Soviet Union
- In office 19 March 1946 – 29 January 1948
- Preceded by: Office established Himself as People's Commissar of Justice of the Soviet Union
- Succeeded by: Konstantin Gorshenin

Prosecutor of the Russian Soviet Federative Socialist Republic
- In office August 1937 – January 1938
- Preceded by: Faina Nyurina
- Succeeded by: Ivan Golyakov

Personal details
- Born: 2 December 1897 Belokholunitskiy Plant, Slobodskoy Uyezd, Vyatka Governorate, Russian Empire
- Died: 28 March 1959 (aged 61) Malakhovka, Lyubertsy District, Moscow Oblast, Soviet Union
- Party: Communist Party of the Soviet Union (since 1917)
- Awards: Order of Lenin; Order of the Red Banner

Nikolay Mikhailovich Rychkov (2 December 1897 – 28 March 1959) was a Soviet statesman and lawyer. Deputy of the Supreme Soviet of the Soviet Union of the 2nd Convocation.

== Biography ==
- 1909–1917 – Apprentice turner, metal turner at the Ural Nadezhdinsky Plant;
- 1917–1918 – Secretary of the Nadezhdinsky Executive Committee of the Soviet of Workers' and Soldiers' Deputies, Commissar of Local Economy;
- 1918 – Delegate to the 7th Congress of the Russian Communist Party (Bolsheviks), joined the "Left Communists";
- 1918–1920 – in the bodies of the All–Russian Extraordinary Commission in the Urals;
- 1921–1922 – Deputy Chairman of the Military Tribunal of the 5th Army, Irkutsk;
- 1922–1927 – Prosecutor of the Siberian Military District;
- 1927–1931 – Deputy Prosecutor of the Workers' and Peasants' Red Army;
- 1931–1937 – Member of the Military Collegium of the Supreme Court of the Soviet Union, divisional military lawyer;
- 1937–1938 – Prosecutor of the Russian Soviet Federative Socialist Republic;
- 1938–1948 – People's Commissar (Minister) of Justice of the Soviet Union.

He came into conflict with the Head of the Department of Judicial and Prosecutorial Personnel of the Personnel Department of the Central Committee of the All–Union Communist Party (Bolsheviks) Anatoly Bakakin. A campaign was organized against Rychkov and in January 1948, he was removed from his post. The Commission for Acceptance and Delivery of Cases of the Ministry of Justice of the Soviet Union recognized Rychkov's work as unsatisfactory.

- 1948 – in the reserve of the Main Directorate of Personnel of the Ministry of the Armed Forces of the Soviet Union;
- 1948–1951 – Deputy Military Prosecutor of the Ground Forces;
- 1951–1955 – Deputy Chief Military Prosecutor;
- Retired from May 1955;
- Nikolay Rychkov died on March 28, 1959, in the village of Malakhovka, Lyubertsy District, Moscow Region. He was buried in Moscow, at the Vagankovsky Cemetery.

== Participation in mass repressions ==
He took an active part in mass repressions as a member of the Military Collegium of the Supreme Court of the Soviet Union. Participant of the Moscow Show Trials of 1936–1938. In 1937–1938, he repeatedly traveled to the eastern regions of the Soviet Union, where he chaired major trials of "counter–revolutionary crimes" allegedly committed by the leading regional elite and local intelligentsia.

As People's Commissar of Justice of the Soviet Union, he repeatedly issued orders on the order of consideration of cases of counter–revolutionary crimes. At the same time, being guided by legal formalism and "insuring himself" against possible accusations, he ordered the courts to strictly observe procedural norms when considering any cases.

He took an active part in mass campaigns in cases of labor crimes (Decree of the Presidium of the Supreme Soviet of the Soviet Union of June 26, 1940), in cases of petty hooliganism and petty embezzlement at enterprises (Decree of the Presidium of the Supreme Soviet of the Soviet Union of August 10, 1940), in cases of labor crimes committed at military enterprises (Decree of the Presidium of the Supreme Soviet of the Soviet Union of December 26, 1941) and so on.

In 1947–1948, he headed the Permanent Commission for Open Trials on the Most Important Cases of former servicemen of the German army and German punitive bodies, exposed of atrocities against Soviet citizens in the temporarily occupied territory of the Soviet Union.

== Sources ==
- State Power of the Soviet Union. The Highest Authorities and Management and Their Leaders. 1923–1991. Historical and Biographical Reference Book / Compiled by Vladimir Ivkin – Moscow, 1999 – ISBN 5-8243-0014-3
