= Vladimir Terebilov =

Soviet politician (1916–2004)

- Владимир Теребилов

Minister of Justice
- In office 1 September 1970 – 12 April 1984
- President: Nikolai Podgorny; Leonid Brezhnev; Yuri Andropov; Konstantin Chernenko
- Preceded by: Office reestablished
- Succeeded by: Boris Kravtsov

Full member of the Central Committee of the Communist Party of the Soviet Union
- In office 6 March 1986 – 14 July 1990

Personal details
- Born: 18 March 1916 Petrograd, Russian Empire
- Died: 3 May 2004 (aged 88)
- Party: Communist Party of the Soviet Union (1940–1990)
- Education: Leningrad Institute of Law

Vladimir Ivanovich Terebilov (Russian: Владимир Иванович Теребилов; 5 March 1916 – 3 May 2004) was a Soviet judge and politician, who served as Ministry of Justice of the Soviet Union for slightly less than fourteen years from 1970 to 1984.

== Early life and education ==
Terebilov was born in Petrograd on 5 March 1916. He graduated from the Leningrad Institute of Law in 1939.

== Career ==
Terebilov worked as the head of the military collegium archives. He was also a member of the central committee of the Communist Party He also served in the Supreme Soviet as a deputy of the Uzbek Soviet Socialist Republic.

Just before his appointment as justice minister, he acted as one of the deputy chairmen of the Soviet supreme court. He served as justice minister from 1 September 1970 to 12 April 1984. Boris Kravtsov succeeded him as justice minister. Then Terebilov was appointed chairman of the Soviet supreme court on 23 April 1984. Terebilov replaced Lev Smirnov in the post, who had been holding the post for twelve years. Terebilov allegedly "cleaned" the archives of the court during his tenure. He retired on 12 April 1989. However, Terebilov was made a member of the advisory committee formed at justice ministry in 1998.

== Work and death ==
Terebilov is the author of a book entitled The Soviet court (1986). He died on 3 May 2004.
