= Political pensioner =

Pension awarded to a politician

A political pensioner is a member of a formerly ruling dynasty who is paid a 'pension' (e.g. by the British raj) as a partial compensation for the income lost by not exercising an ancestral claim to a native throne.

== UK domestic politicians ==
By the Political Offices Pension Act 1869, pensions were instituted for those who had held political office. For the purposes of the act, political offices were divided into three classes:

1. those with a yearly salary of not less than £5,000;
2. those with a salary of less than £5,000 and not less than £2,000;
3. those with a salary of less than £2,000 and more than £1,000.

For service in these offices there may be awarded pensions for life in the following scale:

1. a first class pension not exceeding £2,000 a year, in respect of not less than four years service or its equivalent, in an office of the first class;
2. a second class pension not exceeding £1,200, in respect of service of not less than six years or its equivalent, in an office of the second class;
3. a third class pension not exceeding £800 a year, in respect of service of not less than ten years in an office of the third class.

The service need not be continuous, and the act makes provision for counting service in lower classes as a qualification for pension in a higher class. These pensions are limited in number to twelve, but a holder must not receive any other pension out of the public revenue, if so, he must inform the treasury and surrender it if it exceeds his political pension, or if under he must deduct the amount. He may, however, hold office while a pensioner, but the pension is not payable during the time he holds office. To obtain a political pension, the applicant must file a declaration stating the grounds upon which he claims it and that his income from other sources is not sufficient to maintain his station in life.

== Other ==
Similar 'golden cage' arrangements were often made later by other (not only British) governments. An extreme case was the French Emperor Napoleon Bonaparte, for whom the Italian island of Elba was turned into an operetta 'empire' until his escape, Hundred Days revolt and miserable banishment to St. Helena.

== India ==
Political pensioners were formerly reigning dynasties of Indian princely states that had been dethroned and their states annexed by British India under the doctrine of lapse.

== Soviet Union ==
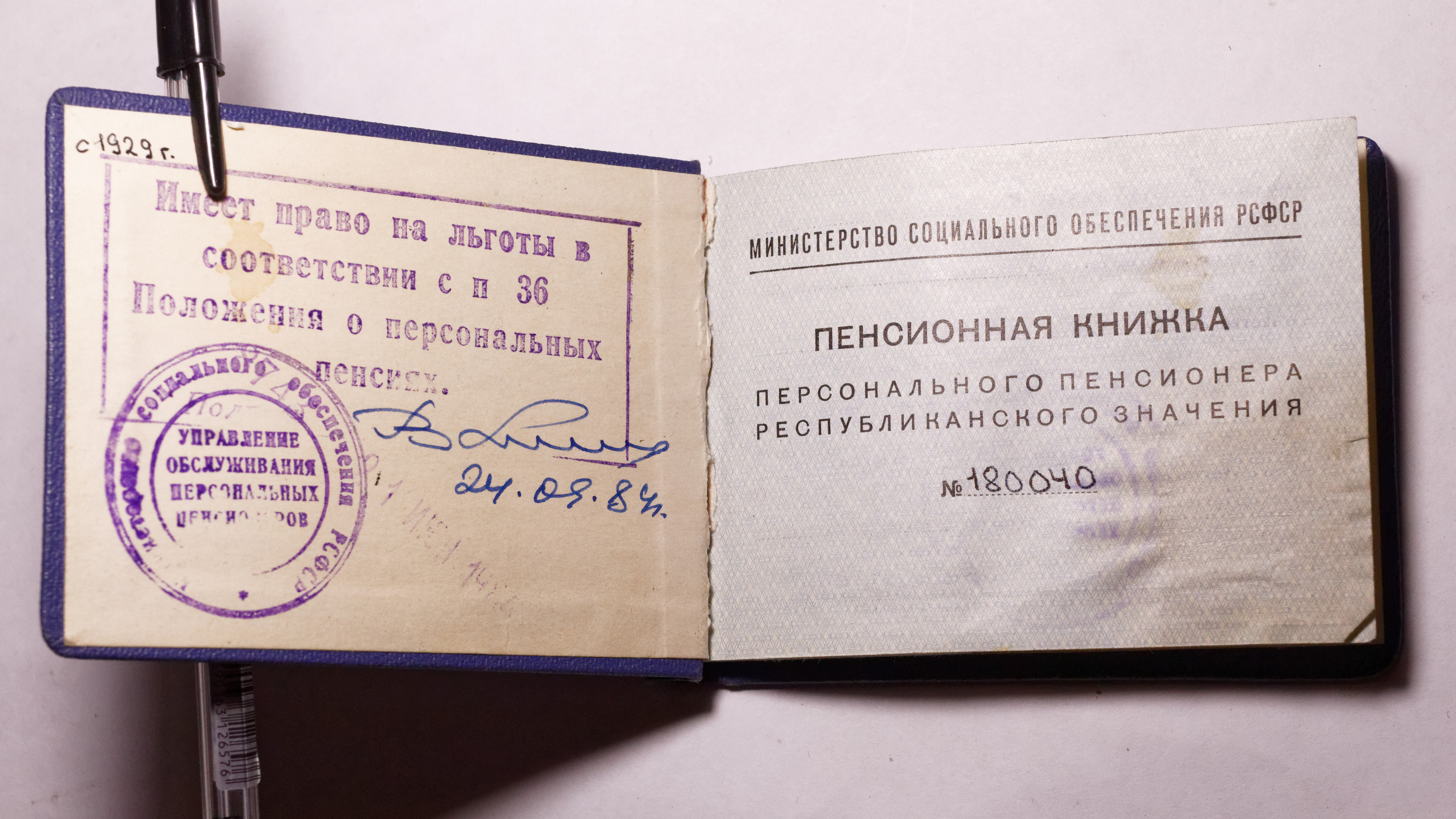
Pension book of a personal pensioner of republican significance. RSFSR, 1980s

On July 16, 1920, the Decree of the Council of People's Commissars of the RSFSR "On pensions for individuals with special merits before the Workers' and Peasants' Revolution" was signed. The Resolutions "On enhanced pensions" of December 5, 1921 and "On personal pensions for individuals with exceptional merits before the Republic" of February 16, 1923 were published.

In accordance with the last Decree of the Council of People's Commissars of the RSFSR, a Commission was created under the People's Commissariat of Social Security of the RSFSR to resolve issues of assigning benefits to individuals with exceptional merits before the Republic. On May 20, 1930, it was liquidated, and its functions were transferred to a similar commission established directly under the government: the Council of People's Commissars of the RSFSR.

In 1946, the system of payment of personal pensions of republican and local significance was adjusted: the size of the personal pension was linked to merit, the degree of loss of ability to work, the number of dependents, and also to his earnings before applying for a pension. At the same time, the maximum for a personal pension of republican significance was 1,200 rubles, and for local significance - 600 rubles per month. This was at least twice as high as the usual old-age pension (300 rubles per month), and the maximum pension of republican significance exceeded the average salary of workers and employees. If a personal pensioner chose a professional pension because it was higher, he lost the benefits "for Merit". The social package was essentially the main advantage of a personal pensioner. This was the preferential right to specialized medical care and prosthetics for the pensioner himself and his dependent family members (spouse), the purchase of medicines at an 80% discount, an annual one-time cash benefit of up to two pensions and vouchers to sanatoriums (the pensioner himself received them for free, and the wife - at a significant discount), free travel on public transport (once a year - and by train), the right to additional living space and a 50% discount on utility bills, the right to additional benefits in connection with the birth of children or in the event of a "special need" (fire, flood, serious illness). Personal pensioners received access to food "orders" that were provided through closed distributors and included scarce goods.

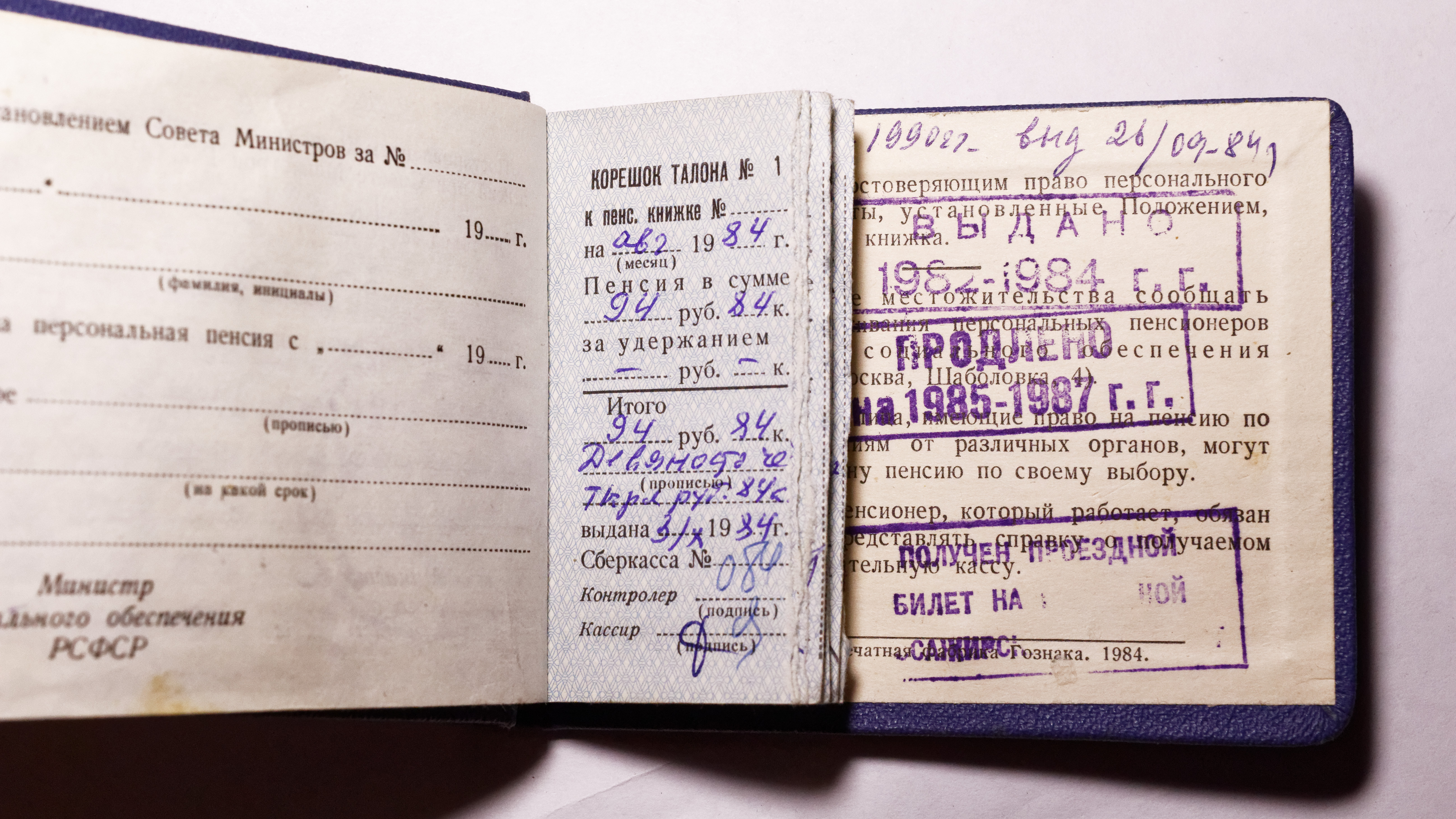
Coupon stubs in the pension book of a personal pensioner. Monthly personal pension in 1984 94 rubles, in 1989 170 rubles.

By 1951, the party nomenklatura of the Soviet Union received pensions higher than the national average, but they were significantly smaller than the pensions of workers in heavy professions: geologists, oil workers, metallurgists, railroad workers, sailors, and even teachers, doctors, and workers at rural machine and tractor stations, who could receive old-age benefits of up to 90% of their last salary. In addition to their salary (the regional committee secretary received 1,660 rubles), employees of the CPSU Central Committee and members of the government received a “temporary cash allowance” from the party budget, which replaced food rations for them at the end of 1947. This amounted to another 4,000–5,000 roubles per month, and union ministers, taking into account such payments, received up to 25,000 roubles per month. So a personal pension of union significance (1,200–1,500 rubles) meant a deterioration in their standard of living for them..

In the summer of 1953, the development of new conditions for personal pensions began. The Central Committee's Administration proposed establishing pensions for party apparatus employees in the amount of 30% to 90% of their salary, depending on their length of service and health, and also introducing special rules for providing for the family of a party worker in the event of the loss of a breadwinner - up to 60% of the salary for three or more disabled family members. However, calculations showed that the country's budget would not withstand such expenses: the proposed system was to apply to 120,216 employees only at the local level, without taking into account the Central Committee of the CPSU and the Central Committees of the Communist Parties of the Union Republics. In addition, the universal assignment of increased pensions to the nomenklatura deprived these payments of their traditional status: in the Lenin and Stalin periods, they were assigned as a reward. Therefore, the Presidium of the Central Committee of the CPSU ordered the improvement of the existing system.

In 1956, the following were issued: the USSR Law "On State Pensions" of July 14, 1956 and the "Regulation on Personal Pensions" (approved by Resolution of the Council of Ministers of the Soviet Union No. 1475 of November 14, 1956 and valid until 1977). The document stipulated the hierarchy and amounts of personal pensions for certain categories of workers. In the same year, the Commission for the Establishment of Personal Pensions under the Council of Ministers of the RSFSR was created, which was liquidated after the collapse of the Soviet Union by the Resolution of the Council of Ministers of the RSFSR of December 27, 1991.

A 1970 certificate "On the amounts of personal pensions established by the decision of the Government of the USSR for individuals who held the positions of ministers of the USSR or heads of departments of the USSR" shows that with the usual maximum pension of 132 rubles, former ministers of the USSR navy Nikolay Novikov and Viktor Bakayev, former head of the Main Directorate of the Civil Air Fleet Semyon Zhavoronkov, former minister of foreign trade Ivan Kabanov, food industry Vasily Zotov, former first secretary of the Central Committee of the Communist Party of Latvia Yan Kalnberzin received 400 rubles per month. Retired chairmen of state committees received 250-300 roubles per month. Full members of the Soviet Academy of Sciences received an additional 500, and corresponding members - 400 rubles. per month. The personal pension of the Secretary of the CPSU Central Committee was 300, a candidate member of the Politburo - 400, and a member of the Politburo - 500 rubles per month. They retained state dachas and cars with drivers. However, the standard sizes of personal pensions slightly exceeded the usual sizes.

In 1977, the Soviet Council of Ministers signed Resolution No. 1128, which approved the new Regulation.

By Resolution No. 643 of the USSR Council of Ministers dated July 9, 1985, the maximum sizes of personal pensions of republican and local significance were increased. In 1983-1988, the CPSU Central Committee and the USSR Council of Ministers adopted several resolutions aimed at improving the living conditions of old party members, participants in the October Revolution, the Civil War and the struggle to establish Soviet power. Benefits were established for participants in the war in Afghanistan, and resolutions were adopted on establishing personal pensions for outstanding Soviet athletes, as well as employees of party bodies, state authorities and administration, who were laid off “in connection with reorganization.”

In 1990, the Commission on Social Policy of the Council of the Republic of the Supreme Soviet of the RSFSR introduced the following wording into the draft Law "On State Pensions in the RSFSR": "The Commission believes that maintaining privileges for personal pensioners, as well as personal pensions themselves, is contrary to social justice, the Constitution of the USSR and the Constitution of the RSFSR".

Types of personal pensions Depending on merits, the following were established in the Soviet:

- Personal pension of union significance (assigned by the Council of Ministers of the Soviet Union);
- Personal pension of republican significance (assigned by the Council of Ministers of the union republics);
- Personal pension of local significance (assigned by the Council of Ministers of the autonomous republics and the executive committees of the territorial, regional, autonomous regions and districts, city Councils of People's Deputies).
- For personal pensioners in the USSR, benefits were provided (living space was paid at a rate of 50%, a 50% discount was provided for utilities (use of heating, gas, electricity), an 80% discount on the cost of medicines, free prosthetics, etc.), sanatorium treatment.
