= Anatoly Volin =

Chairman of the Supreme Court of the USSR in 1948–1957

- Анатолий Волин

4th Chairman of the Supreme Court of the Soviet Union
- In office August 25, 1948 – February 12, 1957
- Preceded by: Ivan Golyakov
- Succeeded by: Alexander Gorkin

10th Prosecutor of the Russian Soviet Federative Socialist Republic
- In office July 25, 1939 – August 25, 1948
- Preceded by: Mikhail Pankratyev
- Succeeded by: Pavel Baranov

Personal details
- Born: July 9, 1903 Temryuk, Kuban Oblast, Russian Empire
- Died: August 2007 (aged 104) Moscow, Russia
- Resting place: Vvedenskoe Cemetery
- Party: Communist Party of the Soviet Union (1925–1991)
- Spouse: Frida (Maria) Ilyinichna Volina (1912–1994)
- Children: 1
- Education: Saint Petersburg State University
- Profession: Lawyer, teacher of political economy

Anatoly Antonovich Volin (Russian: Анатолий Антонович Волин; July 22, 1903 – August 2007) was a Soviet statesman and lawyer who served as chairman of the Supreme Court of the Soviet Union (1948–1957).

== Biography ==
Born into a large family of fishermen, he was the son and ninth child of Anton Prokhorovich Volin and Irina Ivanovna (née Ganycheva).

From 1920 to 1921, he worked at a fish factory in the city of Temryuk. Since 1921 – chief of the secret part of the headquarters of one of the units of the Workers' and Peasants' Red Army. Member of the Civil War. In 1923–1926, he was a student of the workers' faculty in Krasnodar. Member of the Russian Communist Party (Bolsheviks) since October 1925.

Volin graduated from the Law Faculty of the Leningrad State University in 1930. In 1930–1931, he was a post–graduate student at the Communist Academy in Leningrad.

In 1931–1932, he was a teacher and head of a department at Leningrad University, then in 1932, he was transferred to the Autonomous Karelian Socialist Soviet Republic as head of the sector of culture and public education. He headed a department at Petrozavodsk University. In 1933–1935, he was the prosecutor of Petrozavodsk. Since 1935 – assistant to the prosecutor of the Volodarsky District, prosecutor of the Sokolniki District of Leningrad.

From 1937 to 1939 he was Deputy Prosecutor of the Russian Soviet Federative Socialist Republic. From 1939 to 1948 – Prosecutor of the RSFSR.

From August 1948 to February 1957 – Chairman of the Supreme Court of the Soviet Union. At the same time, in 1948–1952, he participated in the purges of the justice authorities and organized and supervised judicial panels for the consideration of crimes committed by judges. He was suspended from office in connection with the explanation of the plenum of the Supreme Court about the possibility of restitution of housing to rehabilitated citizens in January 1954, which was soon recognized as erroneous by the leadership of the Communist Party of the Soviet Union.

1957–1969 – Deputy Chief Arbitrator of the State Arbitration Commission under the Council of Ministers of the Soviet Union. He fought for control over the justice authorities.

Since 1969, he has been a personal pensioner of union significance. For several years he worked as a consultant for the magazine "Man and Law".

Deputy of the Supreme Soviet of the Russian Soviet Federative Socialist Republic of the second convocation.

He was buried at the Vvedenskoye Cemetery (section 7).

== Perpetuation of memory ==
In 2010, a memorial plaque was installed on the building of the Prosecutor's Office of the Republic of Karelia in memory of the work of Anatoly Volin in the Petrozavodsk City Prosecutor's Office.

== Sources ==
- 100 Years to Anatoly Antonovich Volin // Bulletin of the Supreme Arbitration Court of the Russian Federation – Moscow: YURIT–Bulletin, 2003, No. 7 – Pages 144–146
