= Roman Rudenko =

Soviet lawyer (1907–1981)

- Роман Руденко
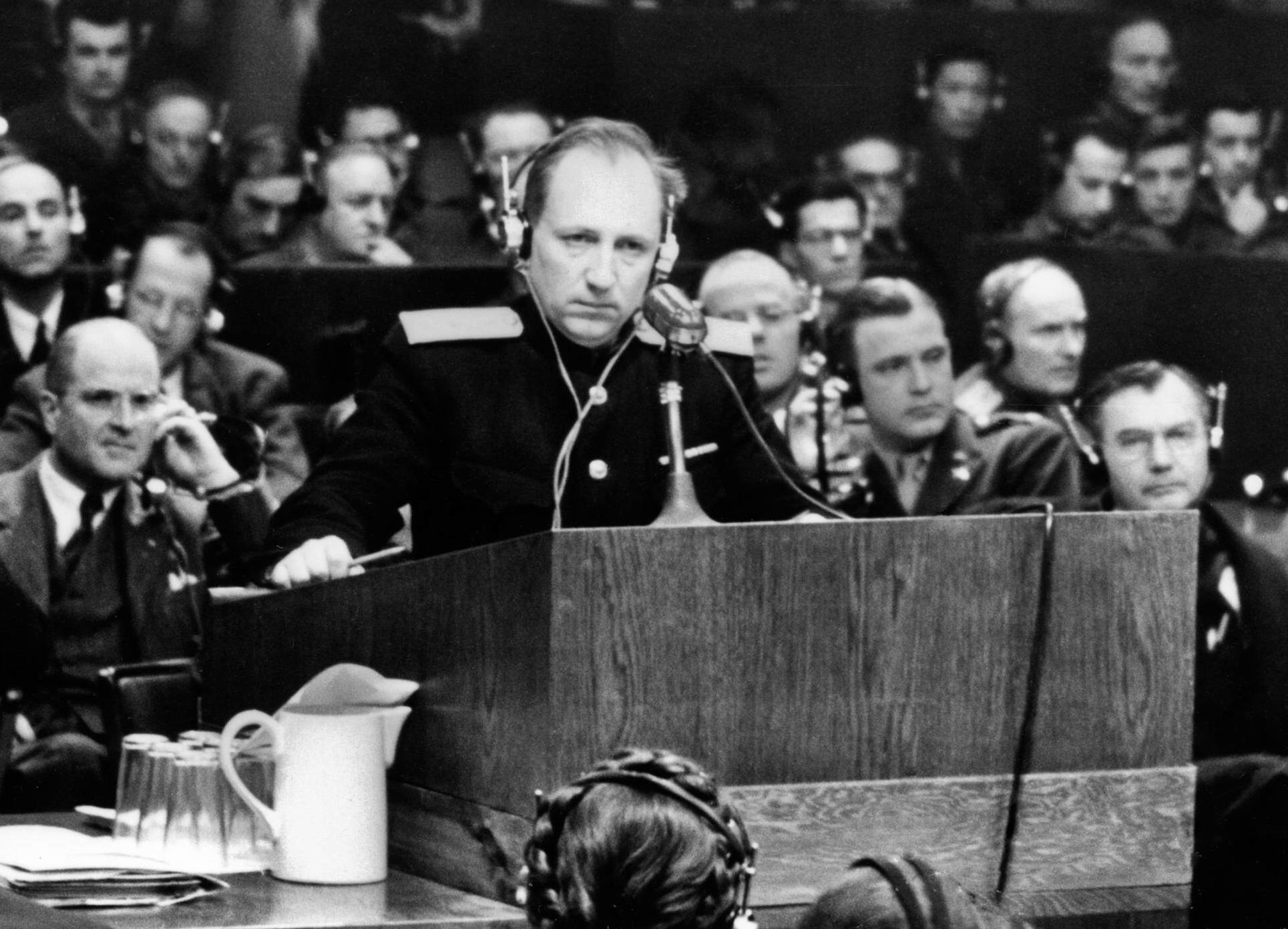
- Rudenko opens the Soviet prosecution at the International Military Tribunal, c. 1945–1946

Procurator General of the Soviet Union
- In office 1 July 1953 – 23 January 1981
- Premier: Georgy Malenkov; Nikolai Bulganin; Nikita Khrushchev; Alexei Kosygin; Nikolai Tikhonov
- Preceded by: Grigory Safonov
- Succeeded by: Alexander Rekunkov

Personal details
- Born: 7 August [O.S. 25 July] 1907 Nosivka, Nezhinsky Uyezd, Chernihiv Governorate, Russian Empire
- Died: 23 January 1981 (aged 73) Moscow, Russian SFSR, Soviet Union
- Party: Communist Party of the Soviet Union (1926–1981)
- Profession: Lawyer, civil servant

Roman Andreyevich Rudenko (Russian: Роман Андреевич Руденко, Ukrainian: Роман Андрійович Руденко, romanized: Roman Andriyovych Rudenko; 7 August [O.S. 25 July] 1907 – 23 January 1981) was a Soviet lawyer and statesman.

Procurator-General of the Ukrainian Soviet Socialist Republic from 1944 to 1953, Rudenko became Procurator-General of the entire Soviet Union after 1953. He is well known internationally for acting as chief prosecutor for the USSR at the 1946 trial of the major Nazi war criminals in Nuremberg. He was also chief prosecutor at the "Trial of the Sixteen" (Polish Underground leaders) held in Moscow the year before. At the time he served at Nuremberg, Rudenko held the rank of Lieutenant-General within the USSR Procuracy.

In 1961, Rudenko was elected to the CPSU Central Committee. In 1972, he was awarded the Soviet honorary title of Hero of Socialist Labour.

== Ukrainian SSR to 1953 ==
Rudenko was one of the chief commandants of NKVD special camp Nr. 7, a former Nazi concentration camp, until its closure in 1950. Of the 60,000 prisoners incarcerated there under his supervision, at least 12,000 died due to malnutrition and disease.

In October 1951, as Procurator-General of the Ukrainian SSR, he personally led prosecution in the trial of OUN member Mykhailo Stakhur, who in October 1949 killed the writer Yaroslav Halan.

== Soviet Union 1953–1981 ==
After the arrest of Lavrentiy Beria in 1953, Rudenko was a judge at the closed trial at which Stalin's last secret police chief was sentenced to death.

In 1960, he acted as the chief prosecutor in U-2 pilot Francis Gary Powers' espionage trial.

As Procurator General of the Soviet Union, Rudenko played a major role in devising measures to deal with the growing dissident movement within the USSR.

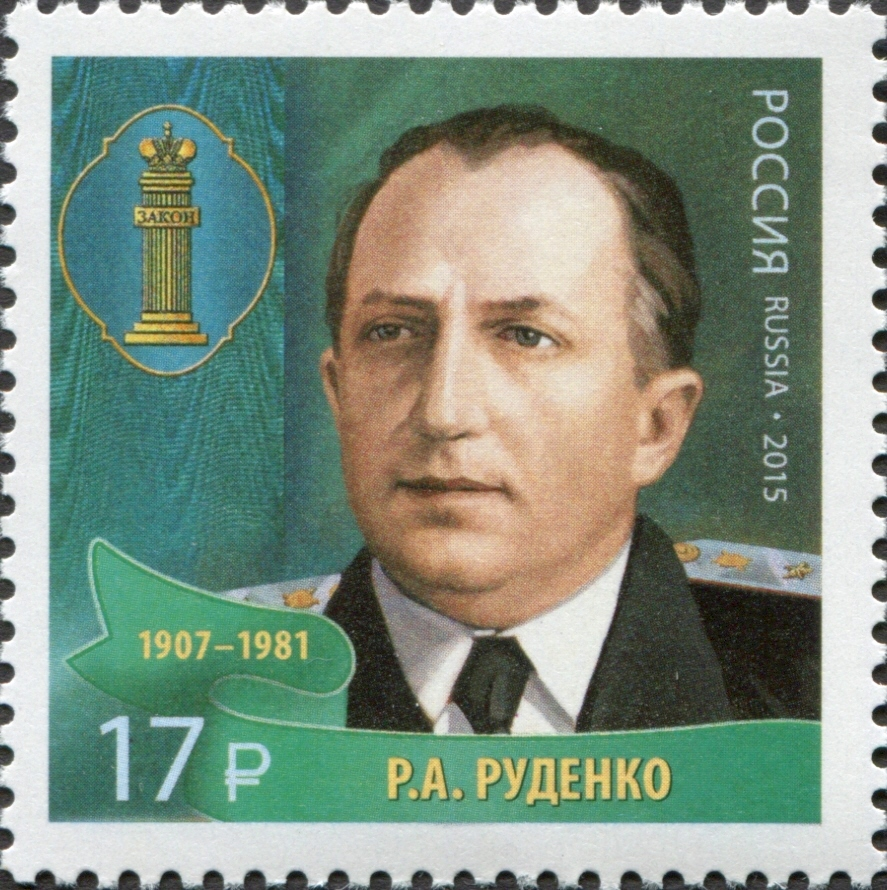
Rudenko on a 2015 Russian commemorative stamp

In 1967, he and then KGB chairman Vladimir Semichastny submitted proposals as to how to deal with those defending the writers Yuli Daniel and Andrei Sinyavsky during and after their trial, without provoking a strong reaction abroad or within the country. This included mention of the "mental illness" suffered by several prominent dissidents. One measure, proposed jointly with Yuri Andropov in late 1972, was to reduce the number of arrests and convictions by reinforcing the issue of "prophylactic" warnings to individuals, cautioning them that their activities could lead to prosecution under Articles 70 and 190^{1} of the RSFSR Criminal Code.
