= Prosecutor's Office of Russia =

Russian government agency

Prosecutor General's Office of the Russian Federation
- Прокуратура Российской Федерации
- Emblem of the Prosecutor's Office of the Russian Federation

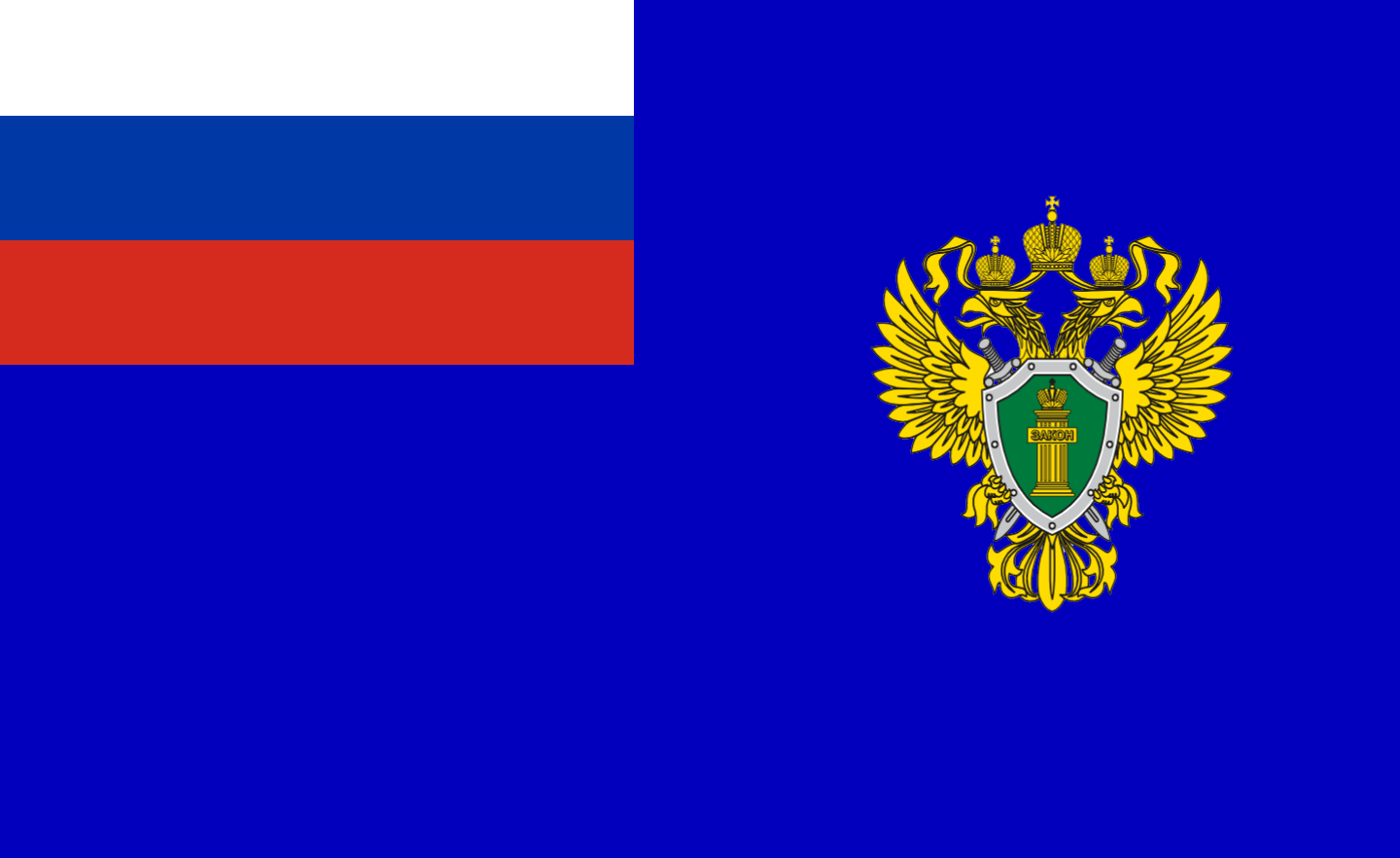
- Flag of the Prosecutor's Office of the Russian Federation

Agency overview
- Formed: 23 January [O.S. 12 January] 1722; 17 January 1992
- Preceding agencies: Prosecutor's Office of the RSFSR; Procuracy of the Soviet Union
- Jurisdiction: Russia
- Headquarters: Moscow, Russia
- Agency executives: Aleksandr Gutsan, Prosecutor General of Russia; Anatoly Razinkin, First Deputy Prosecutor General
- Website: epp.genproc.gov.ru/ru/gprf

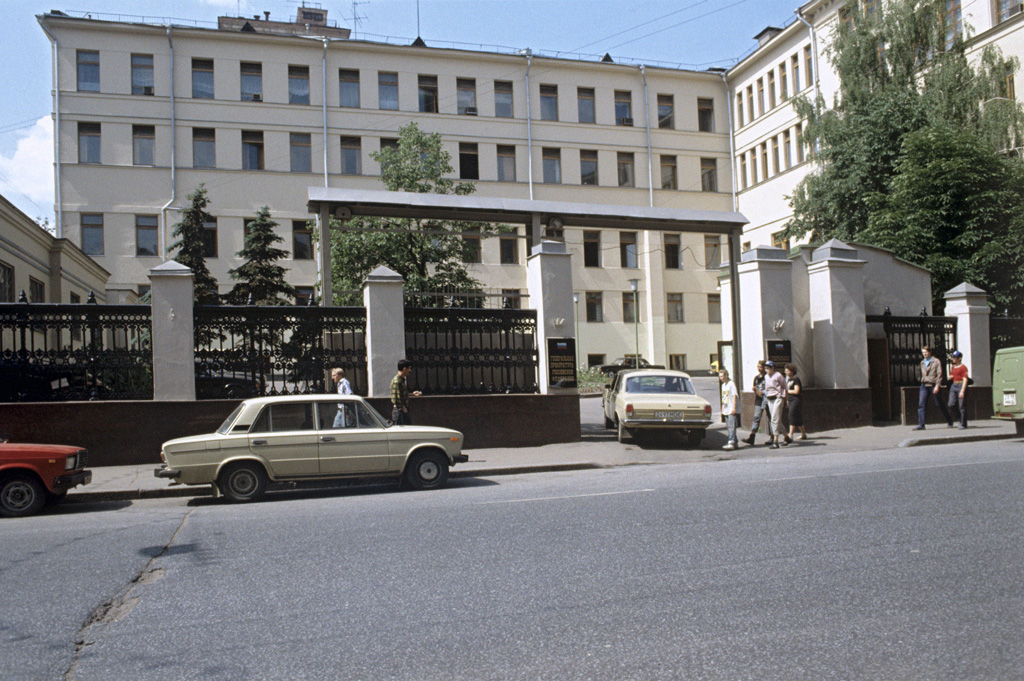
The Prosecutor General's Office building in 1992

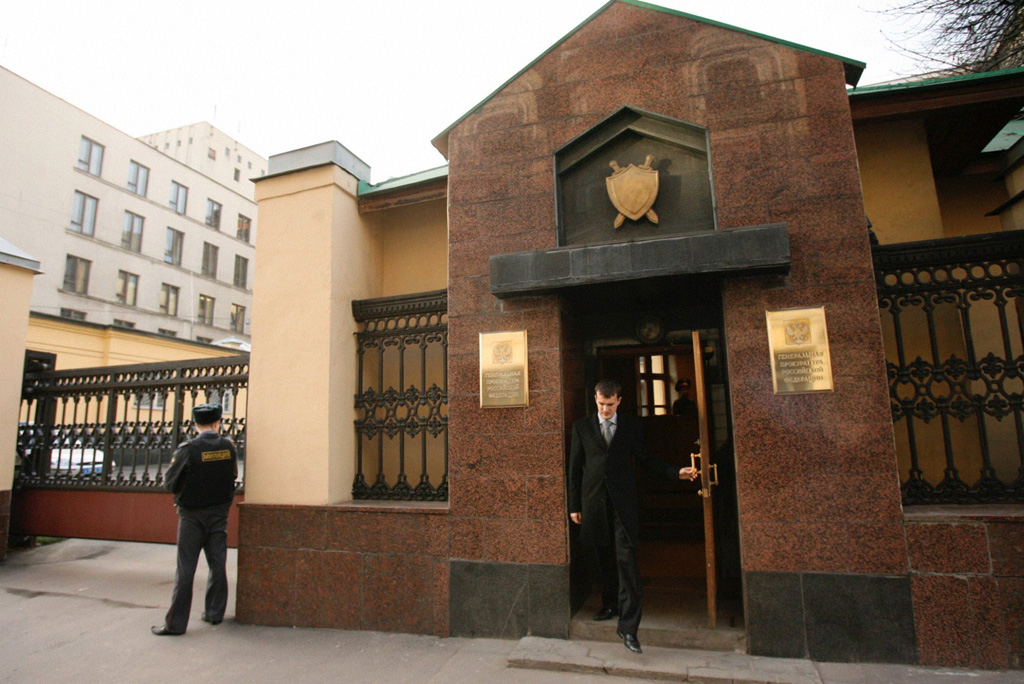
The Prosecutor General's Office building in 2006

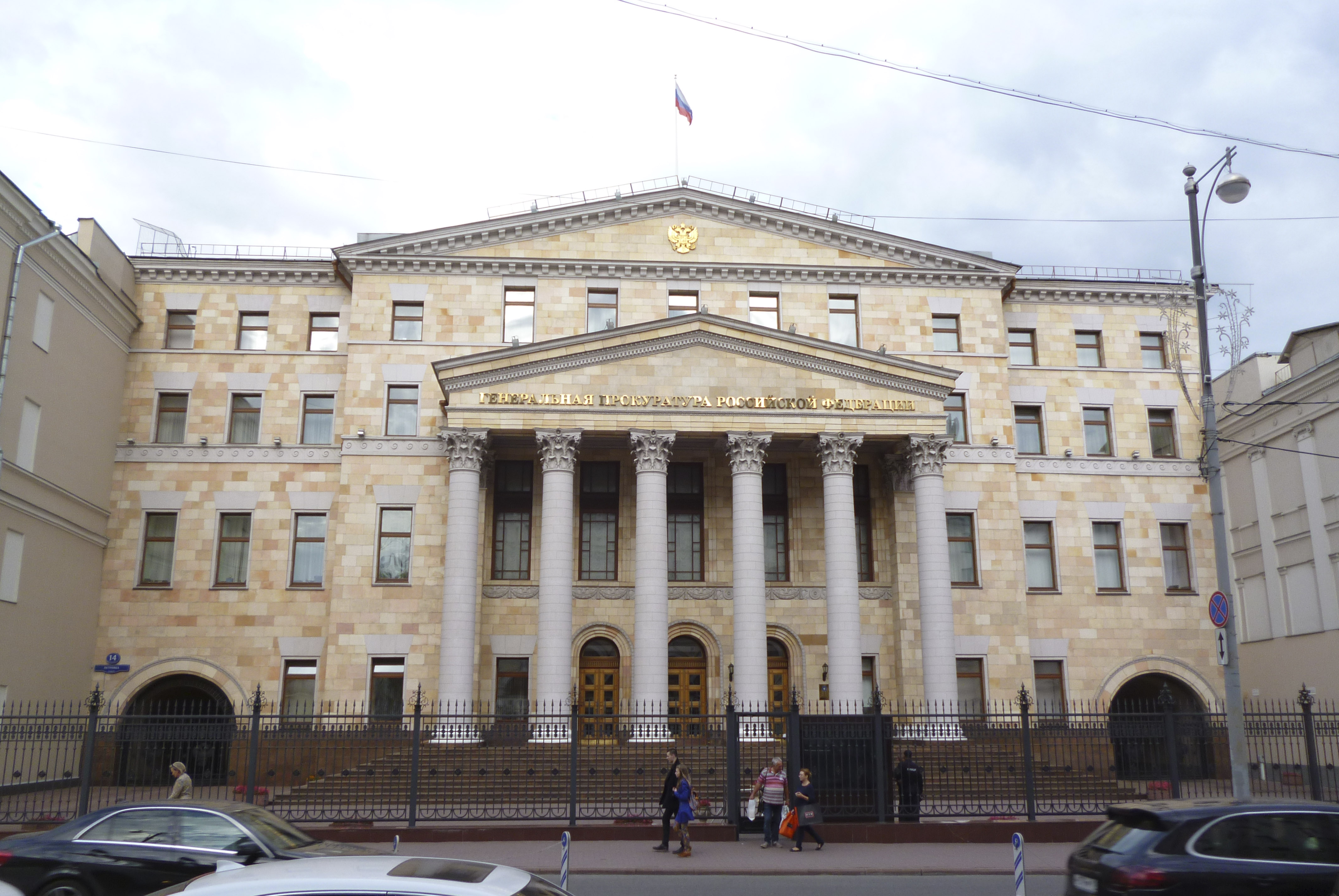
The Prosecutor General's Office building on Petrovka Street

The Prosecutor's Office of the Russian Federation is a unified federal centralized system of bodies responsible for supervising compliance with the Constitution of Russia and the implementation of laws, overseeing the observance of human and civil rights and freedoms, conducting criminal prosecution within its statutory powers, and performing other functions provided by federal law.

The powers, organization and procedure of the Prosecutor's Office are defined by the Constitution of Russia and the Federal Law "On the Prosecutor's Office of the Russian Federation". Under Russian law, the Prosecutor's Office exercises its powers independently of federal and regional state authorities and local self-government bodies. Russian legal commentary has described it as not belonging to the legislative, executive or judicial branches of government. Service in the bodies and organizations of the Prosecutor's Office is federal public service.

== History ==
The Russian prosecutorial system traces its origins to a decree of Peter the Great of 23 January [O.S. 12 January] 1722, which created the post of prosecutor general under the Governing Senate. The first prosecutor general was Count Pavel Yaguzhinsky. Peter described the office as "my eye", a phrase later associated with the supervisory role of the prosecutor general.

From 1802, the prosecutorial institution became part of the newly established Ministry of Justice of the Russian Empire, and the minister of justice simultaneously held the office of prosecutor general. The judicial reform of 1864 separated prosecutorial and judicial functions and provided for prosecutors attached to courts.

After the October Revolution, the Council of People's Commissars of the RSFSR abolished the pre-revolutionary courts, judicial investigators, prosecutorial supervision, jury advocacy and private advocacy by the Decree on Courts No. 1 of November 1917. Their functions were transferred to people's courts, revolutionary tribunals and special investigative commissions.

In May 1922, the All-Russian Central Executive Committee adopted the first Soviet regulation on prosecutorial supervision, establishing a state prosecutor's office within the People's Commissariat of Justice. Its functions included supervision of legality, oversight of investigative bodies, participation in prosecution before courts, and supervision over the legality of detention. In 1923 the Prosecutor's Office of the Supreme Court of the Soviet Union was established. In 1933 the Prosecutor's Office of the Soviet Union was created as a separate state body.

The 1936 Constitution of the Soviet Union vested supreme supervision over the exact implementation of laws by state bodies, officials and citizens in the Prosecutor of the USSR. During the Great Patriotic War, prosecutorial bodies were reorganized for wartime conditions. In 1946, the office was renamed the Prosecutor General of the USSR. The 1977 Soviet Constitution and the 1979 USSR Law on the Procuracy further defined the office's role in legal supervision, criminal prosecution, investigation and coordination of law-enforcement bodies.

After the dissolution of the Soviet Union, Russia adopted a new Federal Law "On the Prosecutor's Office of the Russian Federation" in January 1992. The law removed prosecutorial supervision over citizens' compliance with laws, prohibited prosecutorial interference in economic activity, and introduced supervision over the observance of human and civil rights and freedoms. The 1993 Constitution of Russia established the unity and centralization of the prosecutorial system. Although the Prosecutor's Office is formally independent of the three branches of government, the constitutional provisions on it are located in the chapter concerning the judiciary and the Prosecutor's Office.

Since 2011, the Prosecutor's Office has no longer conducted preliminary criminal investigations in cases formerly assigned to it. Those functions were transferred to the Investigative Committee of Russia, which had operated in 2007–2011 as the Investigative Committee under the Prosecutor's Office and then became a separate federal body.

== Functions ==
Under Article 1 of the Federal Law "On the Prosecutor's Office of the Russian Federation", the Prosecutor's Office supervises the implementation of laws by federal executive authorities, regional legislative and executive authorities, local self-government bodies, military administration bodies, control bodies, officials, commercial and non-commercial organizations, bodies engaged in operational-search activity, inquiry and preliminary investigation, bailiffs, and administrations of penal institutions and detention facilities.

Other statutory functions include initiating administrative-offence proceedings, coordinating law-enforcement bodies in combating crime, international cooperation, challenging unlawful normative legal acts, and applying to the Plenum of the Supreme Court of Russia for clarifications of judicial practice. Prosecutors also participate in court proceedings, challenge court decisions that they consider unlawful, take part in law-making activities, attend meetings of state and local bodies, and consider citizens' applications and complaints.

== Structure ==
The Prosecutor's Office is a unified centralized system based on subordination of lower-ranking prosecutors to higher-ranking prosecutors and to the Prosecutor General of Russia. It includes:

- the Prosecutor General's Office of the Russian Federation;
- departments of the Prosecutor General's Office in federal districts;
- scientific and educational organizations, including the University of prosecutor's office of the Russian Federation;
- prosecutors' offices of the federal subjects of Russia;
- city, district and other territorial prosecutors' offices;
- the Military Prosecutor's Office of the Russia;
- specialized prosecutors' offices, including transport, environmental and penitentiary prosecutors' offices;
- editorial offices of prosecutorial publications.

The Prosecutor General heads the Prosecutor General's Office and is appointed and dismissed by the President of Russia after consultations with the Federation Council. Deputy prosecutors general, including the First Deputy Prosecutor General and the Chief Military Prosecutor, are appointed and dismissed by the President on the recommendation of the Prosecutor General after consultations with the Federation Council. Prosecutors of federal subjects and equivalent prosecutors are appointed by the President in consultation with the Federation Council, while city and district prosecutors are generally appointed by the Prosecutor General.

== Powers ==
When carrying out statutory functions, a prosecutor may enter the premises of supervised bodies, request documents and materials, and summon officials and citizens for explanations. A prosecutor or deputy prosecutor may protest legal acts that contradict the law, submit demands to eliminate violations, request disciplinary or material liability for officials, apply to court to invalidate legal acts, initiate administrative-offence proceedings, issue warnings against violations of law, and review citizens' complaints.

In court proceedings, prosecutors may participate at any stage within their competence and may bring appellate, cassation or supervisory submissions against decisions they consider unlawful or unfounded. In criminal proceedings, the prosecutor acts as the public prosecutor.

=== Uniforms, ranks and weapons ===
Prosecutorial employees are provided with uniforms under the Federal Law "On the Prosecutor's Office of the Russian Federation". Wearing a uniform or military uniform is mandatory when a prosecutor participates in criminal, civil, administrative or arbitration proceedings, as well as in other cases of official representation. Prosecutorial employees serving in military prosecution bodies have the status of servicemen and are assigned military ranks under Russian law.

Prosecutors are also entitled by law to carry and store service firearms and special means, and to use them in accordance with Russian legislation.

== Oath ==
Under Article 40.4 of the Federal Law "On the Prosecutor's Office of the Russian Federation", a prosecutor takes an oath pledging to observe the Constitution, laws and international obligations of the Russian Federation; combat violations of law; protect the interests of the individual, society and the state; treat citizens' applications and complaints attentively and objectively; preserve state and other legally protected secrets; and maintain professional honour and the traditions of the Prosecutor's Office.

== Staffing ==
A presidential decree of 7 November 2022 set the total authorized staffing level of the Prosecutor's Office at 54,198 positions, including 3,583 positions in military prosecution bodies, of which 2,418 were military personnel and 1,165 civilian personnel. A previous presidential decree in 2011 had set the total authorized staffing level at 45,865 positions.

== Criticism and controversies ==
In 2014, Hewlett-Packard admitted that it had paid bribes to unnamed Russian officials in connection with a contract to supply computers to the Prosecutor General's Office at inflated prices in 2000–2003. A United States Department of Justice investigation described payments of millions of dollars and euros through shell offshore companies, some of which were directly linked to officials, and the laundering of funds through bank accounts in Switzerland, Latvia and Austria.

In 2008, co-rapporteurs of the Parliamentary Assembly of the Council of Europe described the Russian prosecutor's office as a "repressive body" and proposed abolishing it.

In 2011, the Federal Security Service uncovered a network of illegal casinos in Moscow Oblast that, according to investigators, was protected by senior officials in the prosecutor's office and regional police. The Investigative Committee of Russia opened a criminal case. Russian media later reported that the so-called gambling case effectively collapsed after the Prosecutor General's Office defended several of those implicated.

== Education and research ==
The main educational institution of the prosecutorial system is the University of prosecutor's office of the Russian Federation in Moscow, formerly the Academy of the Prosecutor General's Office of the Russian Federation. It has branches in Saint Petersburg, Irkutsk, Kazan, Simferopol, Vladivostok and Luhansk. Prosecutorial institutes also operate at several Russian law universities, including the Ural State Law University, Kutafin Moscow State Law University and Saratov State Academy of Law. Research is conducted by the research institute of the University of the Prosecutor's Office.

== Commemoration ==
In 2017, Russian Post issued a postage stamp depicting the Prosecutor General's Office building in Moscow. In 2021, a postal block was issued for the 300th anniversary of the Russian prosecutor's office. In 2022, the Central Bank of Russia issued a three-ruble silver commemorative coin marking the same anniversary.

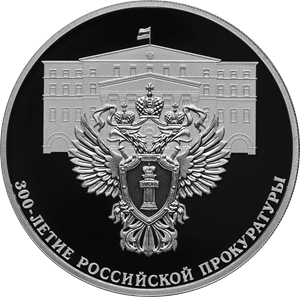
Reverse of the 2022 commemorative coin

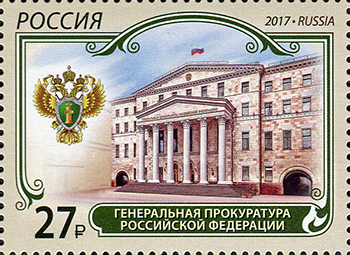
Russian Post stamp depicting the Prosecutor General's Office building, 2017

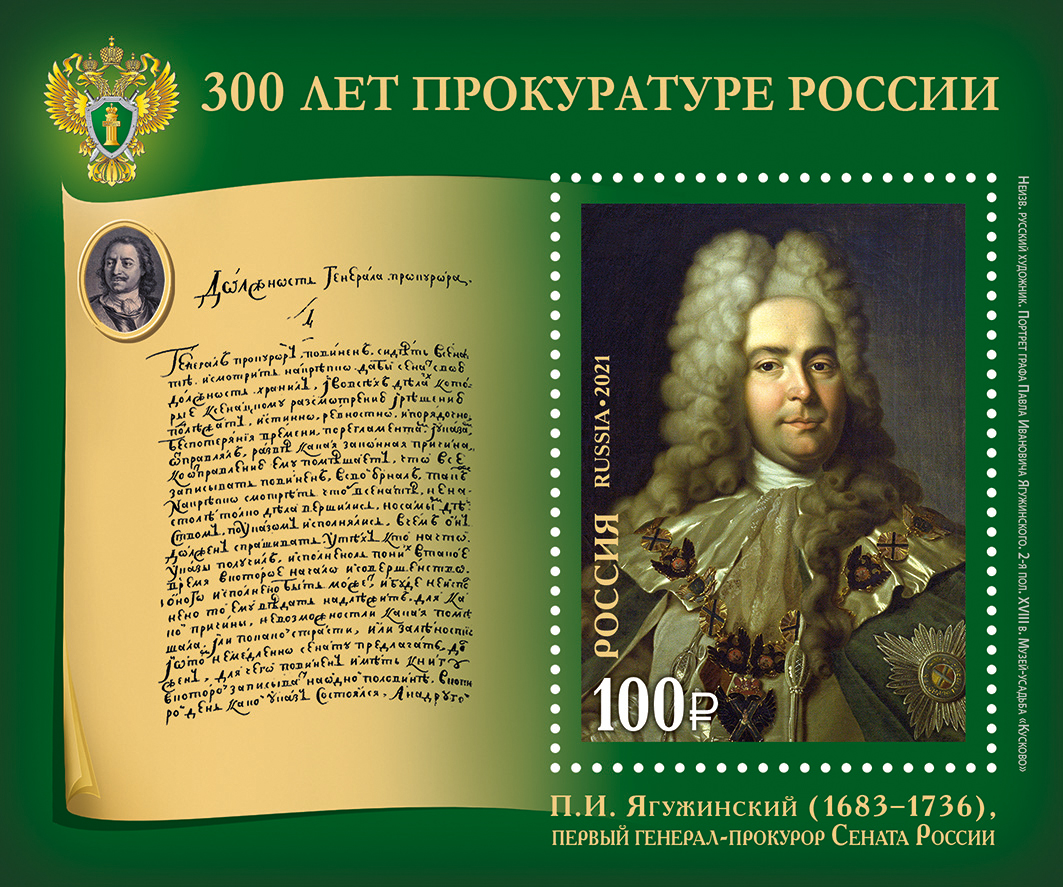
Postal block marking the 300th anniversary of the Russian prosecutor's office

== See also ==
- Prosecutor General of Russia
- Federal Penitentiary Service
