= Chief Justice of the Russian Federation =

President of the Supreme Court

- Emblem of the Supreme Court

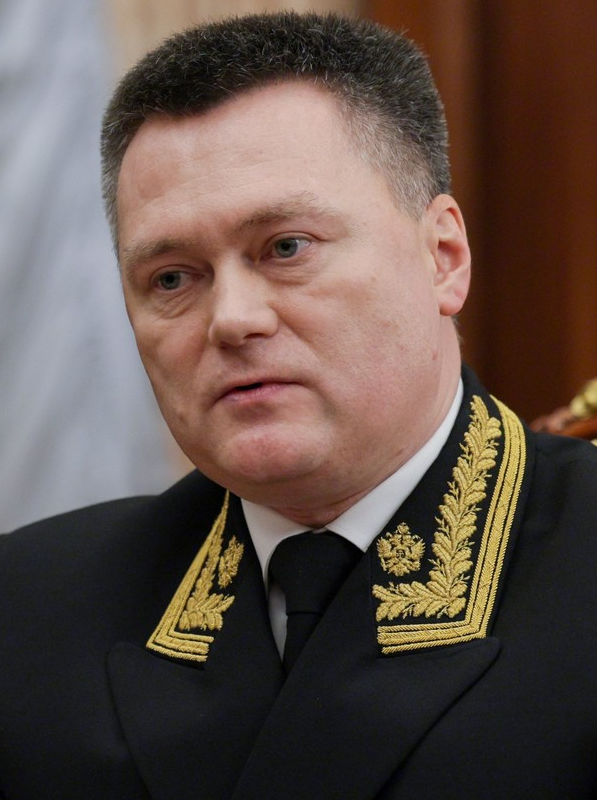
- Incumbent; Igor Krasnov since September 24, 2025
- Supreme Court of Russia
- Type: Chief justice
- Member of: Judiciary of Russia
- Seat: Moscow
- Nominator: President
- Appointer: Federation Council
- Term length: Six years, renewable
- Constituting instrument: Constitution of Russia
- Formation: 1 January 1923; 103 years ago
- First holder: Pyotr Stuchka
- Website: SupCourt.Ru

The chief justice of the Russian Federation, officially the president of the Supreme Court (Russian: Председатель Верховного суда Российской Федерации) is the chief judge of the Supreme Court of Russia and the highest-ranking officer of the Russian federal judiciary.

The Constitution grants plenary power to the president of Russia to nominate, and with the advice and consent of the Russian Federation Council, appoint a chief justice, who serves until they resign, retire, are impeached and convicted, or die.

The current chief justice is Igor Krasnov.

== List ==
=== Chief justices of Soviet Russia ===
Denotes acting Chief Justices

Chief Justice		Took office	Left office	Previous office
1	Pyotr Stuchka (1865–1932)	1 January 1923	25 January 1932	Chairman of the Council of People's Commissars of the Latvian Socialist Soviet Republic (1918-1920)
2	Ivan Bulat (1896–1938)	25 January 1932	17 September 1937	Deputy People's Commissar of Communication Routes of the Soviet Union (1931–1932)
3	Yakov Dmitriyev (1892–1975)	22 September 1937	17 October 1937	Justice of Supreme Court of the Soviet Union (1928–1937)
4	Andrey Solodilov (1900–1948)	27 October 1937	September 1938	Justice of Supreme Court of Russia (1935–1937)
–	Ignaty Rozhnov	September 1938	February 1939	Justice of Supreme Court of Russia (1937–1939)
5	Anatoly Rubichev (1903–1973)	28 January 1939	4 May 1945	Chief Justice of Ryazan Oblast (1937–1939)
6	Alexander Nesterov (1905–?)	4 May 1945	16 June 1949	Chief Justice of Altai Krai (1940–1945)
7	Stepan Bityukov (1905–1966)	August 1949	15 March 1957	Chief Justice of Gorky Oblast (1944–1949)
8	Anatoly Rubichev (1903–1973)	15 March 1957	July 1962	Minister of Justice of Russia (1953-1957)
9	Lev Smirnov (1911–1986)	July 1962	September 1972	Deputy Chief Justice of the Soviet Union (1957-1962)
10	Alexander Orlov (1923–1999)	September 1972	December 1984	First Deputy Chief Justice of Russia (1961-1972)
11	Nikolay Malshakov (1924–1997)	6 December 1984	6 July 1987	First Deputy Chief Justice of Russia (1972-1984)
12	Yevgeny Smolentsev (1923–2017)	7 July 1987	7 June 1989	Deputy Chief Justice of the Soviet Union (1977-1987)
13	Vyacheslav Lebedev (1943–2024)	26 July 1989	26 December 1991	Chief Justice of Moscow (1986-1989)

=== Chief Justice of the Russian Federation ===
Denotes acting Chief Justices

Chief Justice		Took office	Left office	Previous office
13	Vyacheslav Lebedev (1943–2024)	26 December 1991	23 February 2024 (Died in office)	Chief Justice of Moscow (1986-1989)
–	Pyotr Serkov (born 1955)	24 February 2024	17 April 2024	First Deputy Chief Justice of Russia (2009-2025)
14	Irina Podnosova (1953–2025)	17 April 2024	22 July 2025 (Died in office)	Deputy Chief Justice of Russia – Chairman of the Supreme Court Judicial Board on Economic Disputes (2020-2024)
–	Yuri Ivanenko (born 1966)	22 July 2025	24 September 2025	Deputy Chief Justice of Russia – Chairman of the Supreme Court Judicial Board on Economic Disputes (2024-2026)
15	Igor Krasnov (born 1975)	24 September 2025	Incumbent	Prosecutor General of Russia (2020-2025)

== See also ==
- Supreme Court of the Soviet Union
- President of the Constitutional Court of Russia
