= Kutafin Moscow State Law University =

Kutafin Moscow State Law University (MSAL)
- Московский государственный юридический университет имени О. Е. Кутафина (МГЮА)
- Former names: Moscow Institute of Soviet Law (1931—1933); Central Institute of Soviet Law (1933—1937); All-Union Correspondence Institute of Law (1937—1990); Moscow Law Institute (1990—1993); Moscow State Academy of Law (1993—2013)
- Motto: Russian: Не для школы, а для жизни мы учимся Latin: Non scholae sed vitae discimus
- Motto in English: Not for school but for life
- Type: Public
- Established: 1931; 95 years ago
- Rector: Viktor Blazheev (since 2007)
- Academic staff: 900 (2021)
- Students: 15 544 (2021)
- Location: (Russia) Moscow, Moscow, Russia
- Campus: Urban
- Website: msal.ru/en/
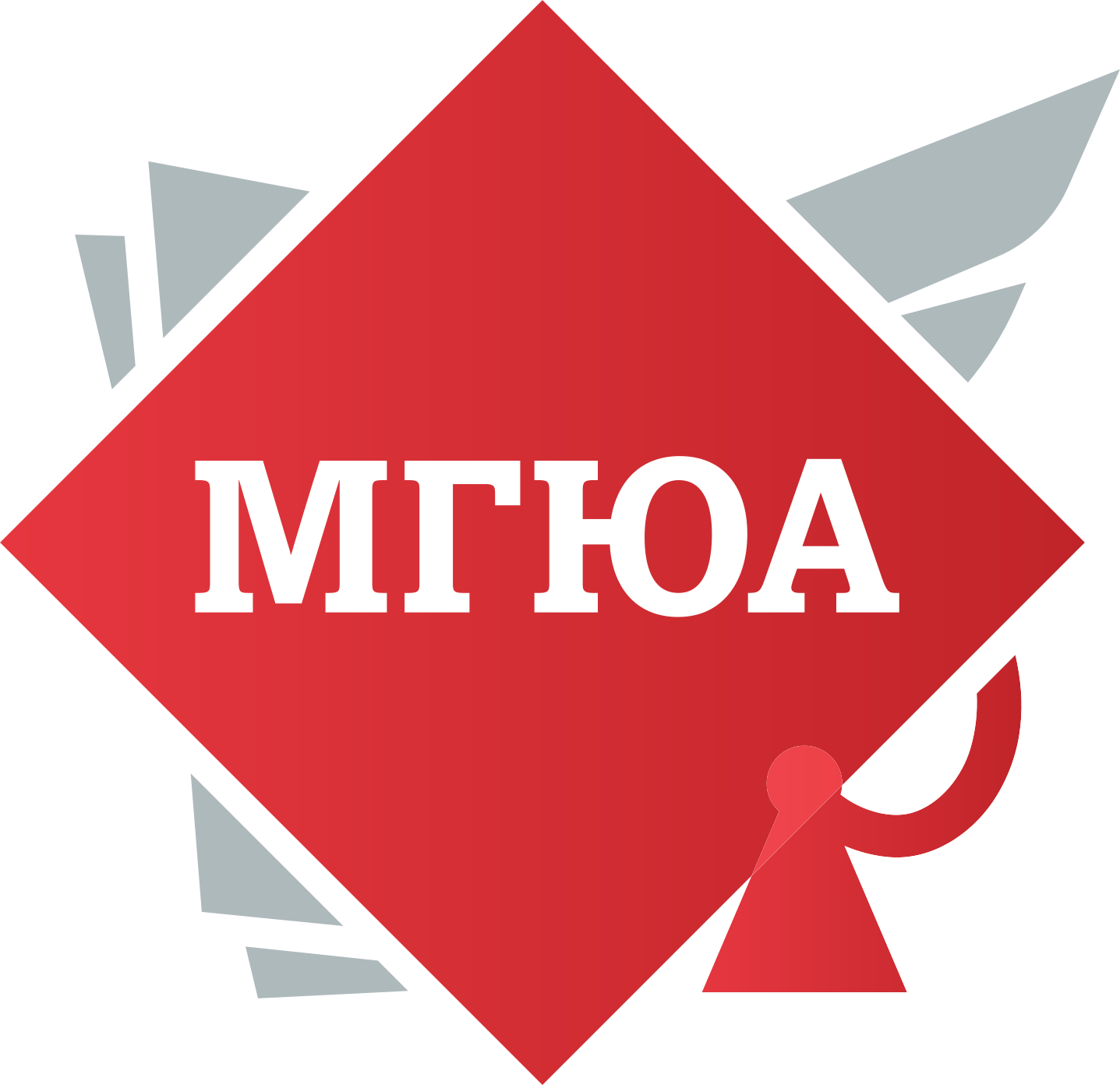

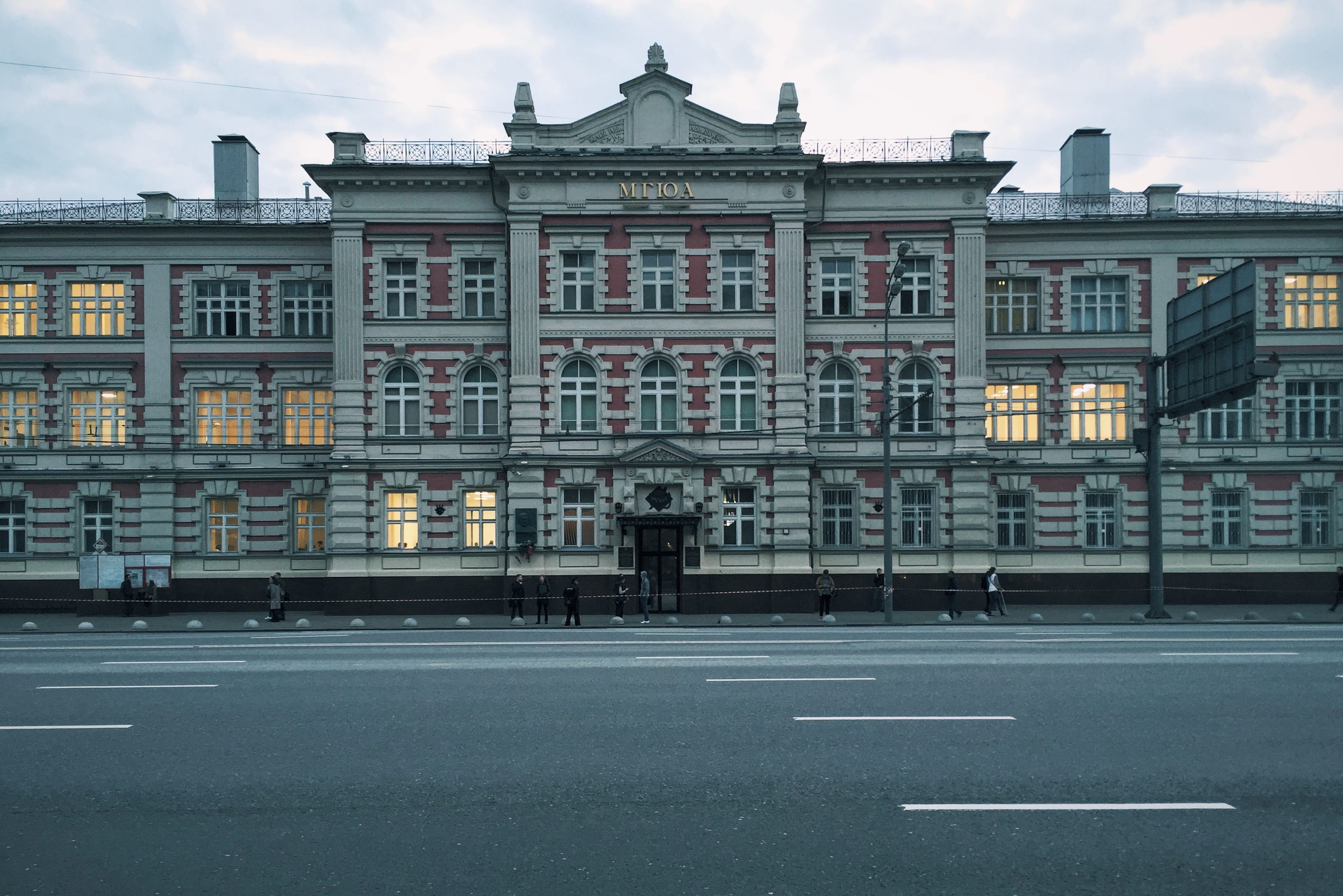
- Academic building on 9, Sadovaya-Kudrinskaya St

General information
- Coordinates: 55.762°N 37.586°E

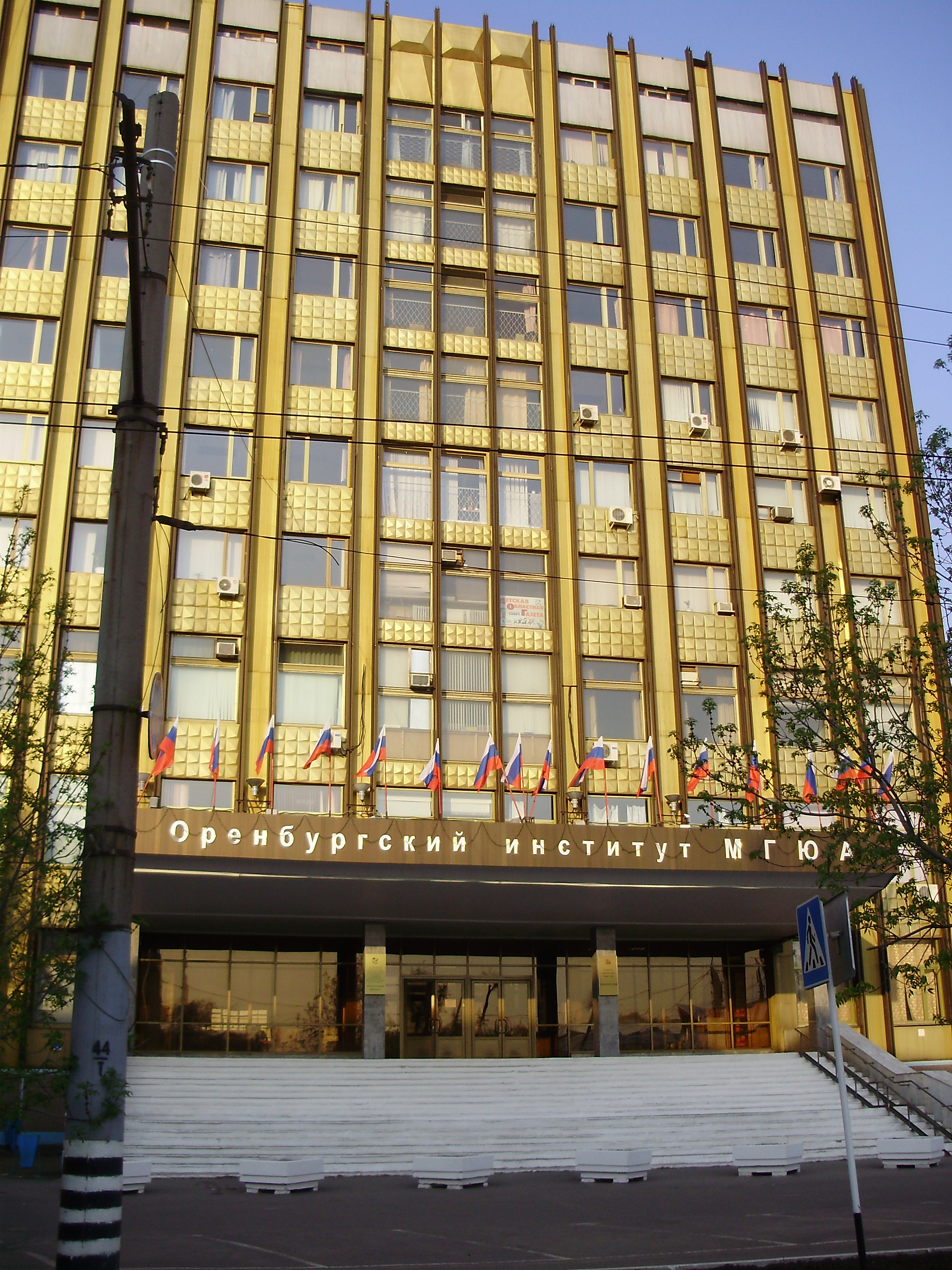
Orenburg Branch of Kutafin Moscow State Law University

Kutafin Moscow State Law University (MSAL) (Russian: Московский государственный юридический университет имени О. Е. Кутафина) is a coeducational and public research university located in Moscow, Russia. It was founded in 1931. MSAL was renamed after Oleg Kutafin in 2012 and was then known as Kutafin University. Its rector is Viktor Blazheev.

== History ==
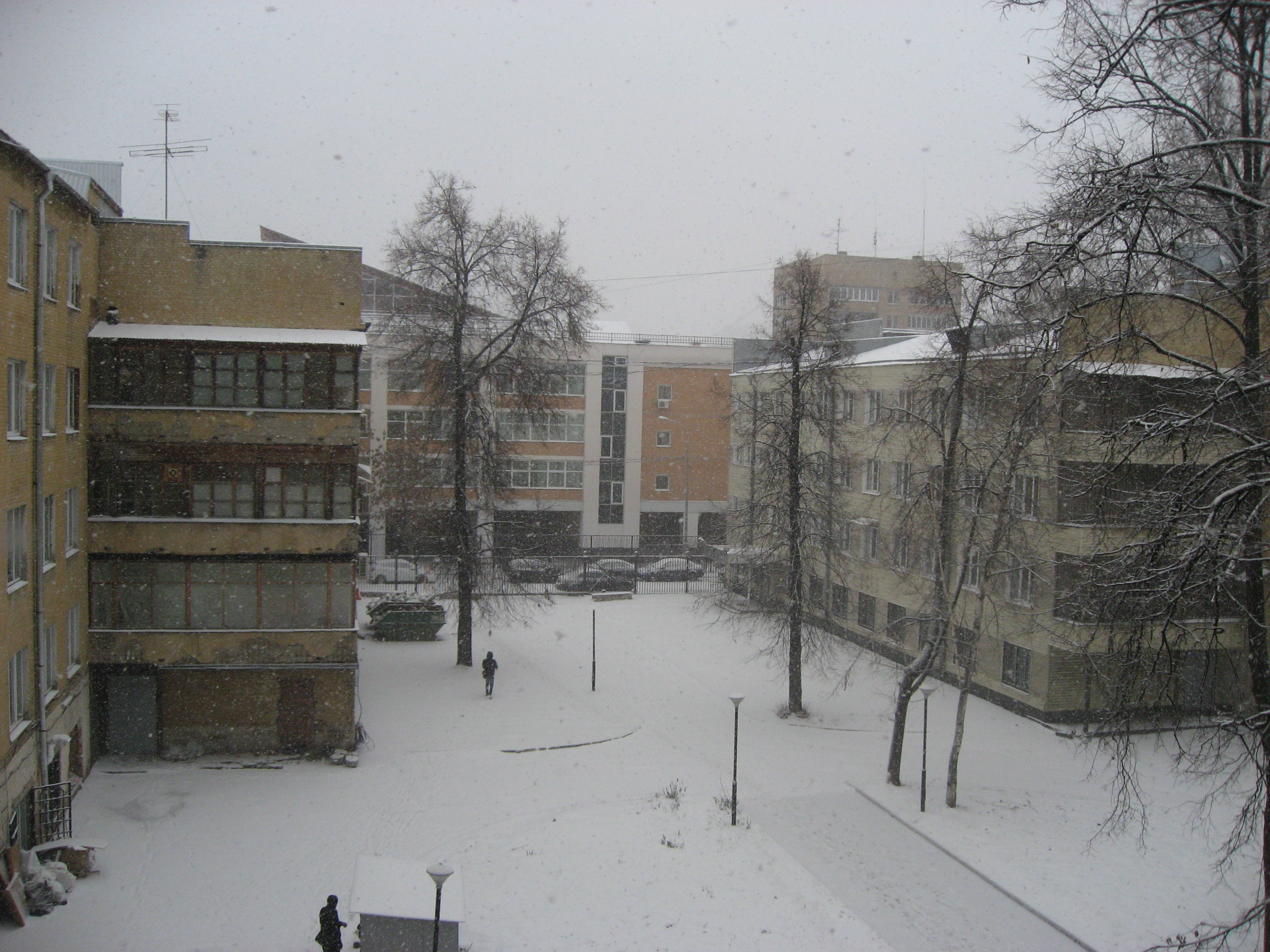
Cour d'honneur of Hostel of Kutafin Moscow State Law University. Moscow, 2 Donskoy proezd 7.

The university's history starts in 1931 when Central correspondence courses on Soviet law were established. It developed initially as an All-USSR correspondence institute of law assuring studies for a degree in law.

Today it is one of the largest law schools in Russia. In 2020 Forbes Magazine ranked MSAL #3 in the Leading in the Forbes Factor. In 2021, the university was included in the Moscow International rating «The Three University Missions» (MosIUR): The Best Universities in Moscow Category (top-33)

== Current activity ==
Since its foundation the university has grown to become the university it is today, educating around 17,000 students. Kutafin Moscow State Law University assured training and graduation of more than 180 thousand specialists of higher legal education.

Presently, the educational process and scientific researches are guaranteed by 11 institutes, 5 branches and 30 departments. More than 20 schools of thought and scientific directions present the foundation of the university's performance. The professorate and other faculty number about 1000 professors, with one corresponding member of the Russian University of Sciences included, over 190 Doctors of Science and 560 candidates of science, 33 Honoured Jurists of the Russian Federation, 16 Honoured Science Workers of the Russian Federation, over 100 honorary members of the university. Moreover, students receive training directly from Mr. Serkov, the First Deputy Head of the Supreme Court's Chief, and Mrs. Novoselova, President of Intellectual Property Court. The faculty has been committed to provide not only full tuition, but also mentoring.

== Institution ==
For years, university has been working to create a range of Institutes:

- Institute of Law
- Institute of International Law
- Institute of Public Prosecution
- Corresponding Law Institute
- Institute of Court Expertise
- Institute of Permanent Education
- Institute of Additional Professional Education
- Institute of Financial and Banking Law
- Institute of Advocacy
- Institute of Energy Law
- Business Law Institute

== International cooperation ==
Kutafin University is currently integrated into the world education as widening international cooperation is an important policy area in the university's overall policy.

The university has established international relations with foreign institutes and think tanks of CIS countries, European and Asian nations and the United States of America. Interchange agreements were concluded with the Universities of Bonn, Potsdam, London and Wales.

== Staff and students ==
Currently the university employs more than 200 academics and 1,000 support staff. More than 16,000 undergraduates and 1,000 advanced degree candidates are enrolled.

== Notable alumni ==
- Roman Abramovich, a Russian businessman and politician, former owner of Chelsea F.C. (2003–2022) and Governor of Chukotka (2000–2008)
- Ekaterina Andreeva, a Russian TV presenter, Channel One Russia's main evening news anchor
- Mikhail Barshchevsky, a Russian lawyer and former advocate
- Yuri Baturin, a Russian cosmonaut and former politician
- Aleksandr Brechalov, a Russian politician currently serving as Head of the Udmurt Republic (since 2017)
- Timur Dibirov, a Russian handball player playing for RK Zagreb and the Russian national team
- Maria Gaidar, a Ukrainian and former Russian politician, former Advisor to President of Ukraine (2017–2019), daughter to Yegor Gaidar
- Valery Gazzaev, a Russian football manager and coach and former footballer
- Ekaterina Gordon, a Russian singer and TV presenter
- Alexei Gorinov, a Russian opposition politician, former deputy of Moscow's Krasnoselsky District Council (2017–2022)
- Pavel Kolobkov, a Russian politician and retired épée fencer, former Minister of Sport (2016–2020)
- Alexander Korzhakov, a Russian politician and former KGB general who has served as director of Presidential Security Service and Boris Yeltsin's personal bodyguard (1991–1996)
- Boris Kravtsov, a Soviet jurist who has served as Minister of Justice (1984–1989)
- Konstantin Kryukov, a Russian actor
- Vladimir Kryuchkov, a Soviet jurist and diplomat who has served as Chairman of the KGB (1988–1991) and led the State Committee on the State of Emergency during the August Coup
- Anatoly Kucherena, a Russian advocate who has represented former NSA contractor Edward Snowden's interests in Russia
- Igor Lebedev, a Russian politician and former deputy of the State Duma (1999–2021), son to Vladimir Zhirinovsky
- Dmitry Livanov, a Russian politician currently serving as rector of Moscow Institute of Physics and Technology (since 2022), former Minister of Education and Science (2012–2016)
- Stanislav Markelov, a Russian human rights lawyer and advocate murdered by members of the neo-Nazi organization Battle Organization of Russian Nationalists
- Sergey Morozov, a Russian politician, former Governor of Ulyanovsk Oblast (2005–2021)
- Tatyana Moskalkova, a Russian lawyer currently serving as Russia's Commissioner for Human Rights (since 2016)
- Boris Nadezhdin, a Russian opposition politician, an unregistered candidate for the 2024 Russian presidential election
- Alexander Rekunkov, a Soviet jurist who has served as Procurator General of the Soviet Union (1981–1988)
- Pyotr Serkov, a Russian judge currently serving as Deputy Chief Justice of the Supreme Court of Russia (since 2009)
- Aleksei Shaposhnikov, a Russian politician currently serving as chairman of the Moscow City Duma (since 2014)
- Lyubov Sobol, a Russian lawyer and opposition politician, close ally to Alexei Navalny
- Sergey Sobyanin, a Russian politician currently serving as Mayor of Moscow (since 2010), former Vice Prime Minister (2008–2010), Kremlin Chief of Staff (2005–2008) and Governor of Tyumen Oblast (2001–2005)
- Vladimir Vasilyev, a Russian politician currently serving as parliamentary leader of United Russia in the State Duma (since 2021), former Head of Dagestan (2017–2020)
- Gennady Yanayev, a Soviet politician who has served as Vice President of the Soviet Union (1990–1991) and led the State Committee on the State of Emergency during the August Coup
- Ivan Zhdanov, a Russian lawyer and opposition politician, director of the Anti-Corruption Foundation

== See also ==
- Seven Sisters (Moscow)
- Education in Russia
- List of early modern universities in Europe
- List of universities in Russia
- List of rectors of the Moscow State University
