= Supreme Court of Russia =

National supreme court

Supreme Court of the Russian Federation
- Верховный суд Российской Федерации
- Emblem of the Supreme Court

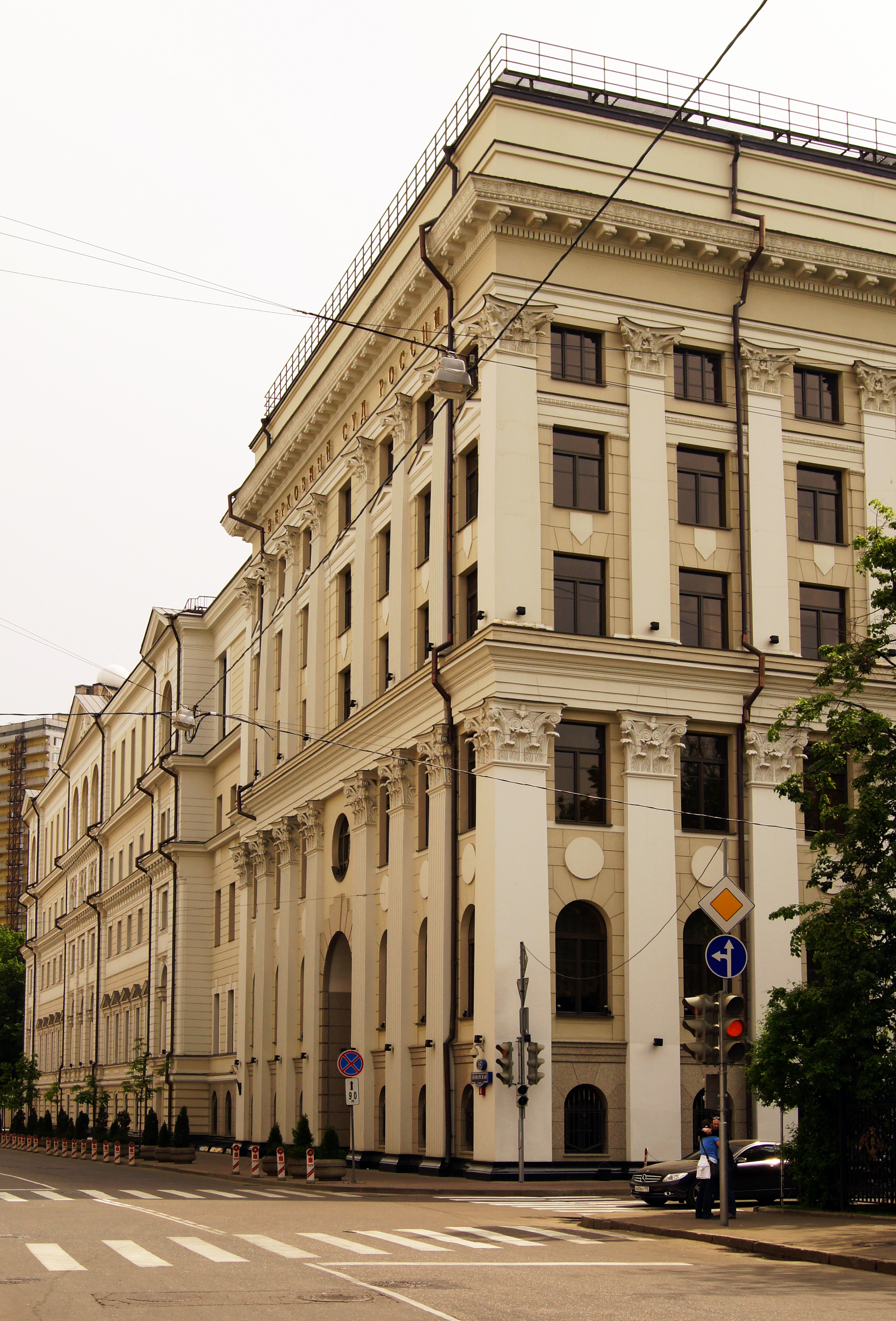
- The building of the Supreme Court of the Russian Federation in Moscow
- Interactive map of Supreme Court of the Russian Federation
- 55°45′17″N 37°35′33″E
- Established: 4 January 1923; 103 years ago
- Location: 13 Povarskaya Street, Moscow (planned for relocation to Saint Petersburg)
- Coordinates: 55°45′17″N 37°35′33″E
- Composition method: Appointment by Federation Council with nomination by President of Russia based on the proposal by Prime Minister of Russia
- Authorised by: Constitution of Russia
- Judge term length: Mandatory retirement at age 70
- Number of positions: 170, by law
- Website: supcourt.ru

Chief Justice
- Currently: Igor Krasnov
- Since: 24 September 2025

The Supreme Court of the Russian Federation (Russian: Верховный суд Российской Федерации, romanized: Verkhovny sud Rossiyskoy Federatsii) is a court within the judiciary of Russia and the court of last resort in Russian administrative law, civil law, criminal law and commercial law cases. It also supervises the work of lower courts. Its predecessor is the Supreme Court of the Soviet Union.

According to Article 22 of the Federal Law "On the Supreme Court of the Russian Federation", the permanent residence of the Supreme Court of the Russian Federation is the city of Saint Petersburg. However, this provision comes into force from the date when the Supreme Court of the Russian Federation begins to function in this city, which is conducted by the President of the Russian Federation in accordance with the Supreme Court of the Russian Federation. Until that date, the Supreme Court of the Russian Federation shall exercise its powers in the city of Moscow.

== Composition ==
There are 115 members of the Supreme Court. Supreme Court judges are nominated by the President of Russia and appointed by the Federation Council. In order to become a judge, a person must be a citizen of Russia, be at least 35 years old, have a legal education, and have at least 10 years of service.

The Supreme Court consists of the Judicial Panel for Civil Affairs, the Judicial Panel for Criminal Affairs, and the Military Panel, which deal with respective cases. Those cases in which the Supreme Court is the original jurisdiction are heard by the panels. Appeals of the decisions of the panels are brought to the Cassation Panel. Whereas a panel reviews the decisions of lower courts, an appeal is brought to the Presidium of the Supreme Court.

Plenary sessions of the Supreme Court are held at least once every four months. A plenary session must be attended by all judges of the Supreme Court and the Prosecutor General of Russia. At plenary sessions the Supreme Court studies the judicial decisions of lower courts on various topics and adopts resolutions, which establish recommendations on the interpretation of particular provisions of law for lower courts for uniform application. Russian law does not recognize judicial precedent as a source of law, but courts strictly follow such recommendations.

The Academic Consultative Council attached to the Supreme Court of the Russian Federation (Russian: Научно-консультативный совет при Верховном Суде Российской Федерации, romanized: nauchno-konsultativnyy sovet pri verkhovnom sudeh rossiyskoy federatsii) is a body created in order to assist the Supreme Court in various legal and academic matters. It comprises members of the Supreme Court itself, academics, practicing lawyers, and law enforcement officers. The members of the Academic Consultative Council are elected at plenary sessions of the Supreme Court.

== Powers ==
The Supreme Court of the Russian Federation has original jurisdiction in certain cases. Those include: challenging of individual acts of the Federal Assembly and decrees of the President of Russia and the Government of Russia; challenging of delegated legislation of governmental agencies; termination of political parties and all-Russian NGOs; challenging of actions of Central Electoral Commission of Russia when organizing presidential elections, State Duma elections or referendum. The Supreme Court may also hear criminal cases against members of the Federation Council of Russia, the State Duma, and federal judges by their discretion.

The Supreme Court is also the court of last resort for cases heard in lower courts since it reviews decisions of lower courts. When petition requesting reverse of a decision of a Supreme Court of Federal Subject comes to the Supreme Court it is observed by one of the judges of the Supreme Court. He may either submit it to respective Board or decline to do it if he finds decision of a lower court "lawful and well-grounded" (common legal expression in Russian courts). The Supreme Court may either affirm or reverse the decision of a lower court. If it is reversed the Supreme Court either renders its own resolution or provides that the case is to be reheard in lower courts.

== Chief Justice ==
Denotes acting Chief Justices

Chief Justice		Took office	Left office	Term of office
1	Vyacheslav Lebedev (1943–2024)	26 December 1991	23 February 2024	32 years, 59 days
–	Pyotr Serkov (1955–)	24 February 2024	17 April 2024	53 days
2	Irina Podnosova (1953–2025)	17 April 2024	22 July 2025	1 year, 96 days
–	Yuri Ivanenko (1966–)	22 July 2025	24 September 2025	64 days
3	Igor Krasnov (1975–)	24 September 2025	Incumbent	139 days
