= Igor Krasnov =

Chief Justice of Russia

- Игорь Краснов
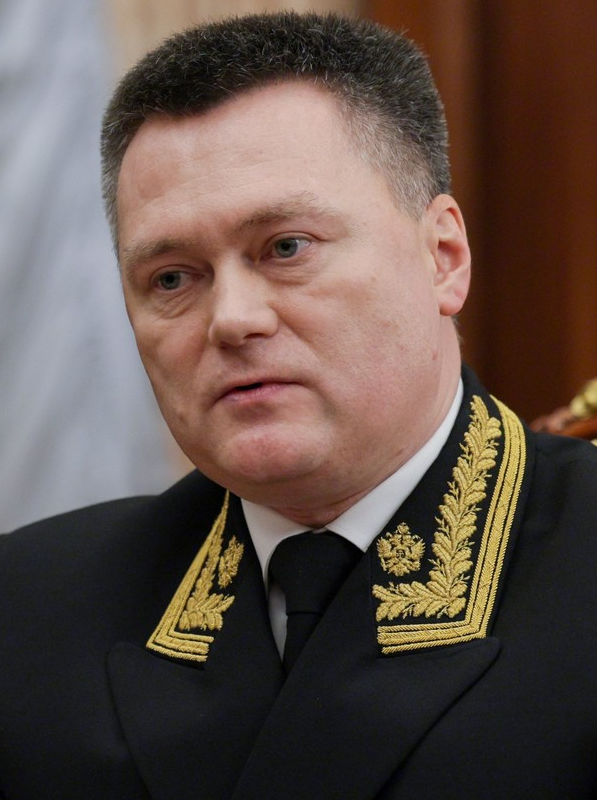
- Krasnov in 2025

Chief Justice of Russia
- Incumbent
- Assumed office 24 September 2025
- President: Vladimir Putin
- Preceded by: Irina Podnosova; Yuri Ivanenko (acting)

Prosecutor General of Russia
- In office 22 January 2020 – 24 September 2025
- Preceded by: Yury Chaika
- Succeeded by: Aleksandr Gutsan

Deputy chairman of the Investigative Committee of Russia
- In office 30 September 2016 – 22 January 2020
- Chairman Committee: Alexander Bastrykin

Senior investigator for particularly important cases Investigative Committee of Russia
- In office 15 January 2011 – 30 September 2016

Personal details
- Born: Igor Viktorovich Krasnov; 24 December 1975 (age 50) Arkhangelsk, Russian SFSR, Soviet Union
- Education: Pomor State University

Military service
- Allegiance: Russia
- Branch/service: Public prosecutor's office; Investigative Committee of Russia
- Years of service: 1997–2025
- Rank: Active State Counselor of Justice; Lieutenant general of Justice

Igor Viktorovich Krasnov (Russian: И́горь Ви́кторович Красно́в; born 24 December 1975) is a Russian lawyer serving as the Chief Justice of Russia since September 24, 2025.

From 2020 to 2025, he served as Russia's Prosecutor General. Deputy chairman of the Investigative Committee of Russia (2016–2020).

== Career ==
Igor Krasnov was born on December 24, 1975, in Arkhangelsk. He graduated from the Law Faculty of Pomor State University (now Northern (Arctic) Federal University). He was a member of the Komsomol.

He began his service as an investigator in the Kholmogorsky District of Arkhangelsk Oblast.

He started serving in the prosecutor's Russia in 1997.

From 2006 to 2007, Krasnov was an investigator of the central office of the General Prosecutor's Office.

In 2007, he joined the Investigative Committee at the prosecutor's office Russia.

In 2011, Krasnov was appointed senior investigator for particularly important cases of the Investigative Committee of Russia. He investigated a number of high-profile criminal cases, including activities of the neo-Nazi group known as "BORN", the murders of Stanislav Markelov and Anastasia Baburova (2009), the assassination attempt on Anatoly Chubais, the assassination of Moscow City Court judge Eduard Chuvashov, the murder of RASH skinhead Ivan Khutorskoy. From 2009 to 2013, he partially investigated the case of the Gang of Amazons.

On February 28, 2015, he headed the investigation team for the deputy of the Yaroslavl Regional Duma assassination of Boris Nemtsov but transferred the case to Major General Nikolai Tutevich for investigation due to his appointment to a higher position.

From September 2014 to March 2015, Krasnov investigated the embezzlement of funds allocated for the construction of the Vostochny Cosmodrome. In 2015, he headed the investigation team and proceedings in the criminal case concerning the murder of the Romanov family, which the Investigative Committee resumed in 2015.

On April 30, 2016, Krasnov was appointed Deputy Chairman of the Investigative Committee by Chairman Alexander Bastrykin.

On January 20, 2020, Russian President Vladimir Putin proposed that the Federation Council approve Igor Krasnov as the Prosecutor General of Russia, replacing Yuri Chaika.

On August 25, 2025, it was announced that Igor Krasnov had applied for the position of Chief Justice of Russia, which had become vacant following the death of Irina Podnosova in July 2025.

On September 24, 2025, he was relieved of his duties as Prosecutor General and appointed Chief Justice by the Federation Council, following the nomination by President Vladimir Putin.

== Honours ==
- Order "For Merit to the Fatherland", 4th class (2025)
- Honoured Lawyer of Russia (2025)
- Order of Alexander Nevsky (2021)
- Russian Federation Presidential Certificate of Honour (2014)
- Medal of the Order "For Merit to the Fatherland", 2nd class (2011)
