= Yelena Masyuk =

Russian television journalist (born 1966)

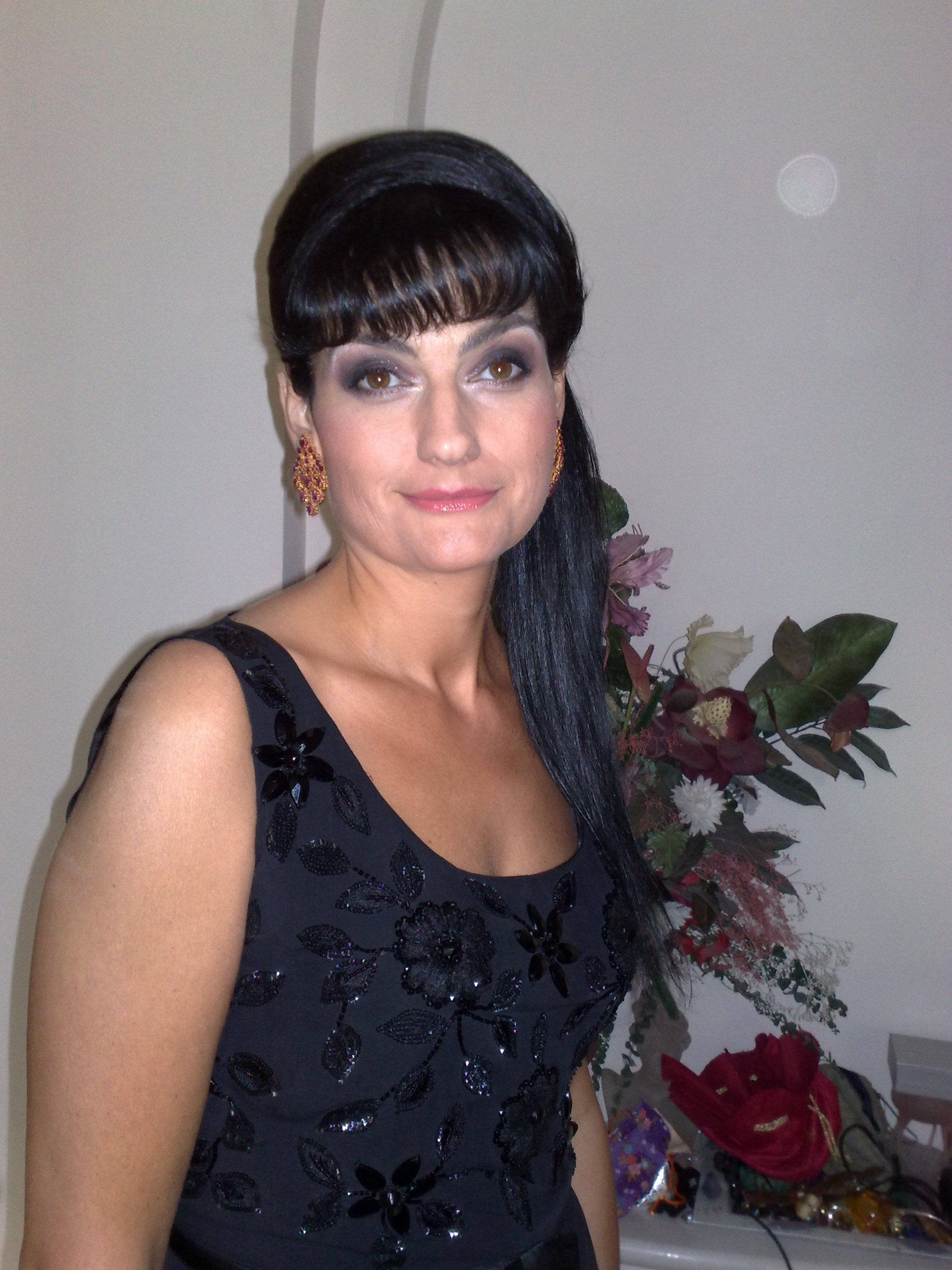
- Born: 24 January 1966 (age 60)
- Education: Moscow State University
- Occupation: Journalist
- Organization: NTV
- Known for: Coverage of First and Second Chechen Wars
- Awards: International Press Freedom Award (1997)
- Masyuk's voice Masyuk on the Echo of Moscow program, 17 May 2007

Yelena Vasilyevna Masyuk (Russian: Елена Васильевна Масюк) (born 24 January 1966) is a Russian television journalist known for her coverage of the First and Second Chechen Wars.

== Journalism ==
Masyuk graduated from Moscow State University with a degree in journalism. In 1994, she began working for the then-independent television station NTV, covering the First Chechen War. She later stated that in her reporting, she tried "to show the Chechen side of the story, to give them a chance to tell their point of view, to show how terrible the war was for civilians and even Russian soldiers". The coverage earned her and NTV Russia's top television awards.

Masyuk went on from Chechnya to report in Afghanistan, Iran, Pakistan, and Tajikistan. According to The Washington Post, "her name became synonymous with hot-spot journalism", and her crew became known as "the bravest, brashest and most professional reporters on the scene". She was also noted for the quality of her contacts within Chechnya.

In 2004, Masyuk created a four-part documentary entitled The Character of Friendship, exploring potential dangers in the Sino-Russian relationship. Despite orders from many local governments that it not be allowed to air, the documentary was shown widely across Russia.

She worked for Novaya Gazeta from 2012 to 2019.

== Legal issues ==
After the first of Masyuk's reports showing the violence in Chechnya, Deputy Prime Minister Oleg Soskovets attempted to revoke NTV's license to broadcast in retaliation. Masyuk was threatened directly with prosecution following an interview in the Nozhnay-Yurtovsky Rayon with Chechen field commander Shamil Basayev immediately after the Budyonnovsk hospital hostage crisis, in which Basayev succeeded in taking over 1,000 civilian hostages. Beginning on 13 July 1995, the attorney general's office of Russia formally investigated Masyuk under Article 189 of the Criminal Code (harboring a criminal) and Article 190 (failure to report a crime), but the case was dropped in August 1995 after the acting attorney general of Russia Alexey Ilyushenko was forced to resign on 8 October 1995 for unrelated corruption charges. (Note: The charges on Alexey Ilyushenko were contained in Yuri Skuratov's 97 volumes indictment involving the theft of 25 million tons of Russian oil, which was worth 2.7 billion rubles, from the Balkar Trading company (Russian: СП "Балкар-Трейдинг") also spelled "Balcar Trading Sari" which was a shell company owned by his wife Tatiana Vladimirovna Ilyushenko (Russian: Татьяна Владимировна Ильюшенко) who was an attorney for the Balkar Bank (Russian: "Балкар-банка") but these charges on Ilyushenko and his friend Pyotr Yanchev (Russian: Петр Янчев), who was the head of Balkar Trading, were dropped on 11 May 2001 by Vladimir Ustinov.)

Vladimir Zhirinovsky, founder of the strongly nationalist Liberal Democratic Party of Russia, accused Masyuk in 1996 of being on the payroll of Chechen separatists. Masyuk took Zhirinovsky to court for slander, and in December 1997, the court ordered him to publicly apologize and to pay Masyuk $5,000 in damages.

In 1998, Masyuk was declared persona non grata by the Foreign Ministry of Tajikistan after broadcasting reports critical of the nation's government.

== Abduction ==
In early 1997, Masyuk had been pulled from a Chechen assignment due to threats against her. However, she persuaded her editor to allow her to cover a rally in the Chechen capital of Grozny and conduct an interview with rebel commander Salman Raduyev. On 10 May 1997 which was the eve of the 12 May 1997 peace accords signed by the Chechen leader Maskhadov and the Russian leader Yeltsin, Masyuk, cameraman Ilya Mordyukov, and sound engineer Dmitri Ulchev were returning from Grozny to Ingushetia when six masked, armed men stopped their car. The three journalists were then forced into another vehicle at gunpoint and driven from the scene.

They would be held for 101 days, the final two months of which were spent in a forest cave. During this time, Amnesty International announced a campaign for her release, as did The Committee to Protect Journalists. On 18 August, NTV paid a $2 million ransom, and the three were released.

Masyuk later commented that she felt the kidnappings had been tactically foolish by the rebels in terms of public image: "Chechens made $16 million on journalists last year, but they lost much more ... They lost the journalists' confidence that they had had during the war." She added that the result was "an information blockade" surrounding the region.

== Awards and recognition ==
Masyuk was named a Duke University media fellow in 1995, teaching at the DeWitt Wallace Center for Communications and Journalism. Following her release from captivity in 1997, she also won the International Press Freedom Award of the Committee to Protect Journalists.

She is a member of Presidential Council for Civil Society and Human Rights.

== See also ==
- List of kidnappings
