= Council of Mothers and Wives =

Organization of Russian military relatives

The Council of Mothers and Wives (Russian: Совет матерей и жен) is an organization formed in 2022 by relatives of Russian military personnel involved in the 2022 Russian invasion of Ukraine.

They have attempted to meet with the Russian president Vladimir Putin, but have been rebuffed, with Putin choosing to meet with a group of military relatives selected by the Russian government.

Their web page on VKontakte has been blocked, with the site saying that this was on orders of the office of the Prosecutor General of the Russian Federation. According to The Moscow Times, the web page had stated an affiliation with the National Union of Russia's Revival before its blocking.
