= Artur Kitayev =

Convicted Soviet-Russian serial killer

- Born: Artur Kimovich Kitayev; 1962; Krasnokamsk, Perm Krai, RSFSR
- Died: 29 September 2019 (aged 56–57); Torbeevsky Central, Torbeyevo, Republic of Mordovia, Russia
- Cause of death: Complications from injuries received during a beating
- Convictions: Murder x6 Theft
- Penalty: Death; commuted to life imprisonment

Details
- Victims: 6
- Span of crimes: 1990–1992
- Country: Soviet Union, later Russia
- State: Smolensk
- Date apprehended: July 1992

Artur Kimovich Kitayev (Russian: Артур Кимович Китаев; 1962 – 29 September 2019) was a Soviet–Russian serial killer who killed six women and girls in Smolensk Oblast between 1990 and July 1992. Dubbed the "last sex maniac of the USSR", he was sentenced to death on 24 February 1994, but his sentence would later be commuted to life imprisonment following the moratorium introduced in the country. In 2019, Kitayev was murdered by his prison cellmate, Dustmurod Ilyosov.

== Biography ==
Little is known about Kitayev's early life. It is known that he was born in 1962 in Krasnokamsk, Perm Krai and had a younger brother named Konstantin. Since his childhood, Kitayev was distinguished as an intelligent and talkative individual, thanks to which he had many friends and acquaintances, but at the same time, these exact people noticed that when drunk, Kitayev showed signs of an antisocial, aggressive personality. In the early 1980s, he was jailed for causing physical harm but was released in the mid-1980s and returned home, where he resumed his criminal lifestyle by committing thefts with his younger brother. After his second arrest, Kitayev was convicted and sentenced to 9 years imprisonment, which he served in a corrective labour colony. After serving a part of his sentence, he was transported to a colony with a more relaxed regime. On 10 August 1990, he escaped and managed to get to Perm where his parents lived. Later on, he moved into a friend's house, where he lived for the next several months. In December 1990, he moved to Smolensk, and once there, he went to the police station claiming that he had been robbed. He presented his father's military ID, as he lived under a different surname, and was thus given a new passport. Soon after, Kitayev found housing in the Kardymovsky District and found a job as a driver for the autoservice "Kamensky" at the local sovkhoz. Kitayev was viewed as a benevolent, model citizen by his fellow countrymen and colleagues, who were unaware of his previous criminal convictions. In his free time, he was involved in organizing disco parties for a rural club, choosing the musical repertoire and composing poetry. In addition, he was popular with women, none of whom reported that he had ever been violent to them.

== Murders ==
Working as a driver, Kitayev had at his full disposal a company-issued car, a ZIL-133, with which he travelled across the region and extensively studied the rural areas. When committing murders, he chose his victims as young female hitchhikers whom he lured into his car and then drove to the woodlands, where he proceeded to beat, rape and perform various sexual acts on the women. After having his way, Kitayev would then strangle the victim to death.

== Arrest and trial ==
In July 1992, Kitayev attacked his last victim in the village of Tvortsy. Because the 40-year-old woman was menstruating, she offered to instead give her assailant a blowjob, to which he agreed. While performing oral sex on him, the woman bit Kitayev's penis, incapacitating him and managing to escape. She went to the police, where, after receiving a description of the attacker, formed police squads to stake out roads, bus stops, railway stations and other public places. After some time, Kitayev was detained at the railway station. While checking his documents, the authorities tracked down the victim, who then identified him from a police lineup. To confirm her testimony, the woman demanded that Kitayev's pants and underwear be removed. After discovering that he had bite marks on his genitals, Kitayev was officially arrested and charged. In February 1994, he was sentenced to death, but the sentence would later be commuted to life imprisonment due to the moratorium imposed on the death penalty in Russia.

== Imprisonment ==
In the 2000s, Kitayev was transferred to serve his sentence at the Torbeevsky Central Colony in Mordovia. During his imprisonment, he was described as a troublesome prisoner who would be repeatedly penalized for violating the rules. In 2010, under unclear circumstances, Kitayev suffered a spinal fracture with injuries to his spinal cord, and due to the resulting complications, had to walk with a noticeable limp and aided himself with crutches. After the incident, Kitayev and his lawyers turned towards a number of human rights organizations, which together with journalist Yelena Masyuk then visited the colony to conduct an investigation. They discovered that Kitayev's injury was a result of being severely beaten by prison guards after he caused an altercation. According to Kitayev, on 19 August 2010, he had been beaten by a group of around five or six guards, headed by Major Sergey Simakov, who hit him with a baton. Kitayev also claimed that Simakov had previously placed him in solitary confinement during the winter season, where he was kept for 12 hours with an open window, and on another occasion, he was kept without a mattress and regularly beaten for 15 days on end. In addition to this, he also claimed that he witnessed Simakov beat up another convict named Kolyagin, who thereafter was left disabled from his injuries, and after he had been beaten, the colony guards forced him to make a written statement claiming that nobody was responsible for his condition.

== Death ==
In July 2019, Kitayev was placed in a two-man cell, with his cohabitant being 29-year-old Tajikistani citizen Dustmurod Ilyosov, who was serving a life sentence for killing four people and attempting to kill a fifth in the village of Demyansk in 2013. Due to their conflicting personalities, Kitayev and Ilyosov frequently quarrelled over the next two months. On 13 September 2019, the pair began arguing again, during which Kitayev used obscene language to describe his dissatisfaction with his cellmate's constant pacing around the cell. In response, Ilyosov attacked Artur, kicking and punching him in the vital organs a total of 33 times. Kitayev was rushed to the hospital for treatment, but complications to his injuries worsened his condition dramatically, as a result of which he died on 29 September. On 5 March 2020, the Torbeevsky District Court found Ilyosov guilty of killing Kitayev and gave him an additional 14 years imprisonment on top of his life sentence. At the court hearings, Dustmurod stated that during the 63 days they lived together, Kitayev constantly criticized him for everything and reproached him, instigating arguments whenever he could. Kitayev's younger brother, Konstantin, was also a part of the case, but wasn't physically present during the trial, providing only written testimony via the investigators. In the testimony, Konstantin stated that after his brother's arrest and subsequent conviction, he ceased any and all contact with him.

== See also ==
- List of Russian serial killers
