= Yuri Ivanenko =

Russian lawyer and jurist (1966)

- Юрий Иваненко
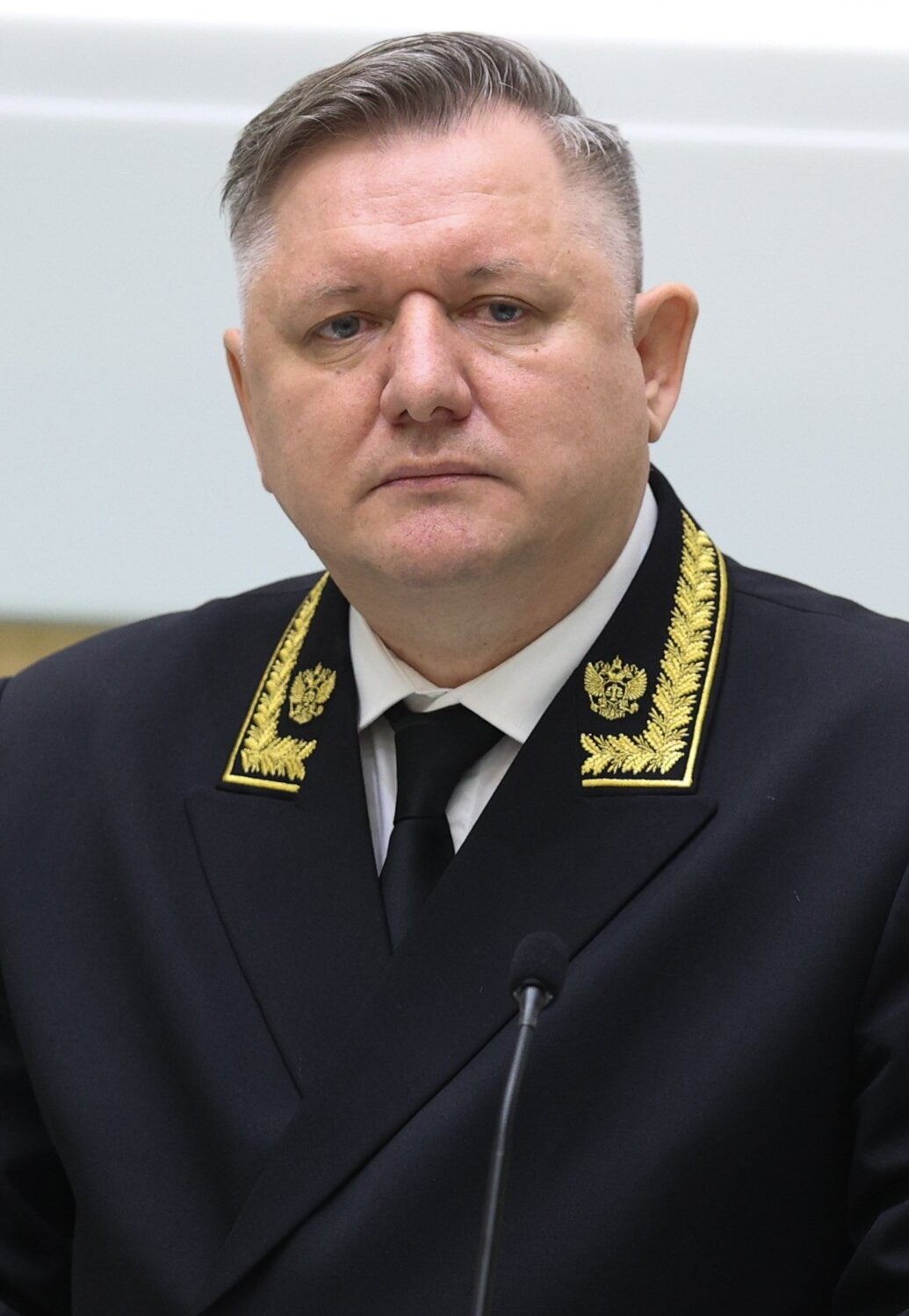
- Ivanenko in 2024

Chief Justice of the Russian Federation
- Acting; 22 July – 24 September 2025
- Preceded by: Irina Podnosova
- Succeeded by: Igor Krasnov

Deputy Chief Justice — President of the Judicial Chamber for Commercial Disputes of the Supreme Court
- In office 17 July 2024 – 9 April 2026
- Chief Justice: Irina Podnosova
- Preceded by: Irina Podnosova

Other judicial positions
- 2015–2024: Judge of the Supreme Court of Russia
- 2009–2015: Deputy Chief Judge of the Leningrad Oblast Court
- 1999–2009: Judge of the Omsk Oblast Court
- 1998–1999: Deputy Chief Judge of the Soviet District Court of Omsk
- 1992–1998: Judge of the Soviet District Court of Omsk

Personal details
- Born: 31 August 1966 (age 59) Bugaly, Bolsherechensky District, Omsk Oblast, Russian SFSR, Soviet Union
- Education: Omsk State University
- Awards: Honoured Lawyer of Russia

Yuri Grigoryevich Ivanenko (Russian: Юрий Григорьевич Иваненко, born 31 August 1966) is a Russian lawyer and jurist. He served as acting Chief Justice of Russia from July to September 2025.

He graduated from Omsk State University in 1992.

Ivanenko started his judicial career in Omsk. From 2009 to 2015, he served as Deputy Chief Judge of the Leningrad Oblast Court for civil cases. On 25 March 2015, he was appointed judge of Russia's Supreme Court.

In 2024, following Irina Podnosova's appointment as Chief Justice of Russia, Ivanenko succeeded her as President of the Judicial Chamber for Commercial Disputes of the Supreme Court. With Podnosova's death in July 2025, Ivanenko became Acting Chief Justice.

On 9 April 2026 Ivanenko resigned from the Supreme Court.

== Awards ==
- Honoured Lawyer of Russia (2022)
