= Aleksandr Gutsan =

Prosecutor General of Russia

- Александр Гуцан
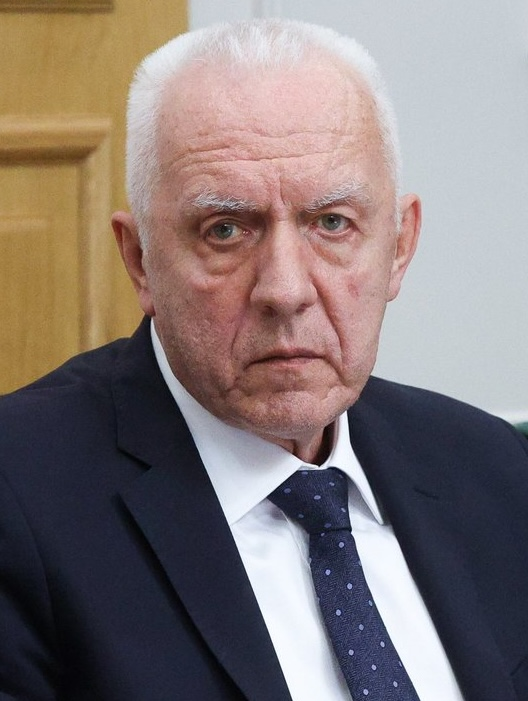
- Gutsan in 2025

Prosecutor General of Russia
- Incumbent
- Assumed office 22 September 2025
- President: Vladimir Putin
- Preceded by: Igor Krasnov

Presidential Envoy to the Northwestern Federal District
- In office 7 November 2018 – 22 September 2025
- Preceded by: Alexander Beglov
- Succeeded by: Igor Rudenya

Deputy Prosecutor General of Russia
- In office 13 April 2007 – 7 February 2018
- Prosecutor General: Yury Chaika

Deputy Director of the Federal Bailiff Service Russia
- In office 20 January 2005 – 13 April 2007
- Chief Bailiff: Nikolay Vinnichenko

Personal details
- Born: Aleksandr Vladimirovich Gutsan; 6 July 1960 (age 66) Siversky, Russian SFSR, Soviet Union
- Education: Leningrad State University
- Profession: Lawyer
- Awards: Order of Friendship; Order of Honour; Honoured Lawyer of Russia; Russian Federation Presidential Certificate of Honour; Certificate of Honor of the Government of the Russian Federation

Military service
- Rank: Actual State Counsellor of Justice of Russia

Aleksandr Vladimirovich Gutsan (Russian: Александр Владимирович Гуцан; born 6 July 1960) is a Russian lawyer and statesman serving as Prosecutor General of Russia since September 24, 2025. Actual State Counsellor of Justice of Russia (2025).

Previously he served as Deputy Prosecutor General from April 2007 to November 2018 and Plenipotentiary Presidential Envoy to the Northwestern Federal District since from November 2018 to September 2025. He is also the member of the Security Council of Russia.

== Biography ==
Gutsan was in the settlement of Siversky, Gatchinsky District, Leningrad Oblast. In his youth, he was actively involved in sports, training in a boxing section.

After completing secondary school, he worked as a trainee and subsequently as a full-fledged precision metalworker. He performed his compulsory military service in the Soviet Armed Forces from 1978 to 1980.

In 1981, he enrolled in the Faculty of Law at Leningrad State University (now Saint Petersburg State University), graduating in 1987. During his studies, he served as the head of his student group, which included Dmitry Medvedev, and as the Komsomol secretary for his year.

His professional career began within the prosecutorial system of Leningrad and then Saint Petersburg.

From 1987 to 2000, he held several posts at the city prosecutor's office.

From 2000 to 2005, he was assistant to the Deputy Prosecutor General of Russia on special assignments. In 2005, he was transferred to the Federal Bailiff Service, where he served as deputy to Chief Bailiff Nikolay Vinnichenko until 2007.

In 2007, he returned to prosecutorial career, being appointed Deputy Prosecutor General under Prosecutor General Yury Chaika.

While serving in the Prosecutor General's Office, he represented the state in several high-profile cases. These included acting as a state prosecutor in the 1996 trial of retired Navy Captain Aleksandr Nikitin, who was acquitted of high treason and state secrets disclosure, and overseeing the investigation into the murder of Saint Petersburg Vice-Governor Mikhail Manevich.

In 2016, while acting as Prosecutor General, he demanded the termination of the criminal prosecution of Dmitry Kamenshchik in the case concerning Sheremetyevo Airport and also discontinued the embezzlement case related to the construction of the Saint Petersburg ring road.

From 2018 to 2025, he has held the position of Plenipotentiary Presidential Envoy in the Northwestern Federal District.

In 2025, he was appointed Prosecutor General of Russia.

== Sanctions ==
He was sanctioned by the UK government in 2022 in relation to the Russo-Ukrainian War.

In response to the 2022 Russian invasion of Ukraine, on 6 April 2022 the Office of Foreign Assets Control of the United States Department of the Treasury added Gutsan to its list of persons sanctioned pursuant to Executive Order 14024.

In 2026, he was sanctioned by the European Union as part of a wider package imposed in relation to the Russo-Ukrainian war and the death of Alexei Navalny.

== Awards ==
- Russian Federation Presidential Certificate of Honour (2015)
- Order of Friendship
- Certificate of Honor of the Government of the Russian Federation (2012)
- Order of Honour (2010)
- Honoured Lawyer of Russia (2008)
