= Pyotr Serkov =

Russian lawyer and jurist (1955)

- Пётр Серков
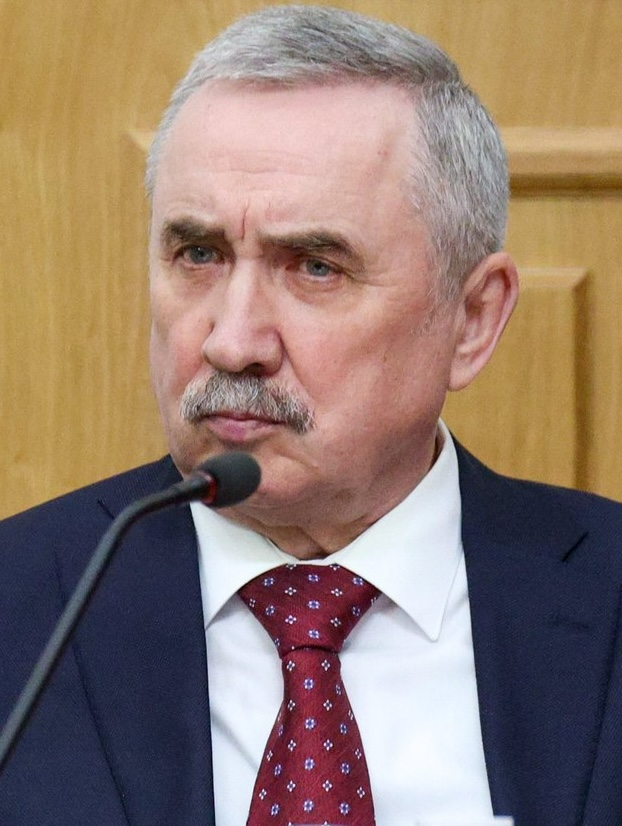
- Serkov in 2025

Chief Justice of the Russian Federation
- Acting; 24 February – 17 April 2024
- Preceded by: Vyacheslav Lebedev
- Succeeded by: Irina Podnosova

First Deputy Chief Justice
- In office 29 April 2009 – 8 December 2025
- Chief Justice: Vyacheslav Lebedev; Irina Podnosova
- Preceded by: Vladimir Radchenko

Other judicial positions
- 2003–2009: Deputy Chief Justice — President of the Judicial Chamber on Administrative Cases of the Supreme Court
- 1995–2003: Chief Judge of the Ulyanovsk Oblast Court
- 1991–1995: Judge of the Ulyanovsk Oblast Court

Personal details
- Born: 7 July 1955 (age 71) Poldamasovo, Ulyanovsk Oblast, Russian SFSR, USSR
- Education: Moscow State Law University

Pyotr Pavlovich Serkov (Russian: Пётр Павлович Серков, born 7 July 1955) is a Russian lawyer and jurist who served as the First Deputy Chief Justice of Russia from 2009 to 2025. He previously served as acting Chief Justice of Russia from the death of Vyacheslav Lebedev until Irina Podnosova was appointed Chief Justice on 17 April 2024.

He graduated from All-Union Correspondence Institute of Law in 1981.

He started his judicial career in Ulyanovsk Oblast. From 2003 to 2009, he served as President of the Judicial Chamber on Administrative Cases of the Supreme Court of Russia.

In 2024, with the death of the long-time Chief Justice of Russia Vyacheslav Lebedev, he became Acting Chief Justice.

== Awards ==
- Order "For Merit to the Fatherland", 4th class (2022)
- Russian Federation Presidential Certificate of Honour (2014)
- Honoured Lawyer of Russia (2003)
