= Irina Podnosova =

Russian judge (1953–2025)

- Ирина Подносова
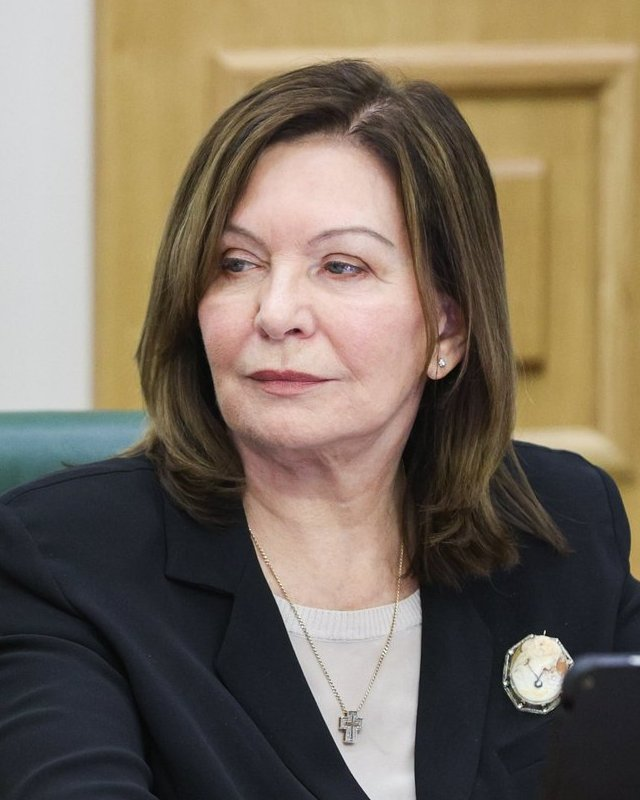
- Podnosova in 2024

Chief Justice of the Russian Federation
- In office 17 April 2024 – 22 July 2025
- Nominated by: Vladimir Putin
- Preceded by: Vyacheslav Lebedev; Pyotr Serkov (acting)
- Succeeded by: Yuri Ivanenko (acting); Igor Krasnov

Other judicial positions
- 2020–2024: Deputy Chief Justice — President of the Judicial Chamber for Commercial Disputes of the Supreme Court
- 2018–2020: Chief Judge of the Second Cassation Ordinary Court
- 2017–2018: Chief Judge of the Leningrad Oblast Court
- 2013–2017: Deputy Chief Judge of the Leningrad Oblast Court
- 2003–2013: Chief Judge of the Luga Town Court
- 1990–2003: Judge of the Luga Town Court

Personal details
- Born: Irina Leonidovna Luneva; 29 October 1953 Pskov, Russian SFSR, USSR
- Died: 22 July 2025 (aged 71) Moscow, Russia
- Education: Leningrad State University

Irina Leonidovna Podnosova (Russian: Ирина Леонидовна Подносова; née Luneva (Лунева); 29 October 1953 – 22 July 2025) was a Russian lawyer who served as Chief Justice of Russia from 17 April 2024 until her death, and had been the first woman to hold the office since its establishment in 1923.

== Life and career ==
Podnosova was Vladimir Putin's coursemate at the Faculty of Law of Leningrad State University.

Podnosova started her judicial career in 1990, when she became a judge of the district court of Luga, a town in Leningrad Oblast, 140 kilometers south of St. Petersburg. In 2003, she headed the Luga Town Court. Before being appointed Chief Justice, she headed the Judicial Chamber for Commercial Disputes of the Supreme Court of the Russian Federation from 2020 to 2024, the Second Cassation Ordinary Court from 2018 to 2020, and the Leningrad Oblast Court from 2017 to 2018. With the death of the long-time Chief Justice Vyacheslav Lebedev, who had presided over the Supreme Court from 1989 until his death on 23 February 2024, Podnosova was the only candidate for the vacant office. The Higher Judges' Qualifications Board recommended appointing Podnosova by a solid vote. On 17 April 2024, Irina Podnosova was appointed Chief Justice by the Federation Council after being nominated by the President of Russia.

Podnosova died from cancer on 22 July 2025, at the age of 71.

== Awards ==
- Order of Honour (2022)
- Russian Federation Presidential Certificate of Honour (2023)

Court offices
Preceded by Vyacheslav Lebedev	Chief Justice of the Russian Federation; 2024–2025	Succeeded by Igor Krasnov
