= Vyacheslav Lebedev (jurist) =

Russian lawyer and jurist (1943–2024)

- Вячеслав Лебедев
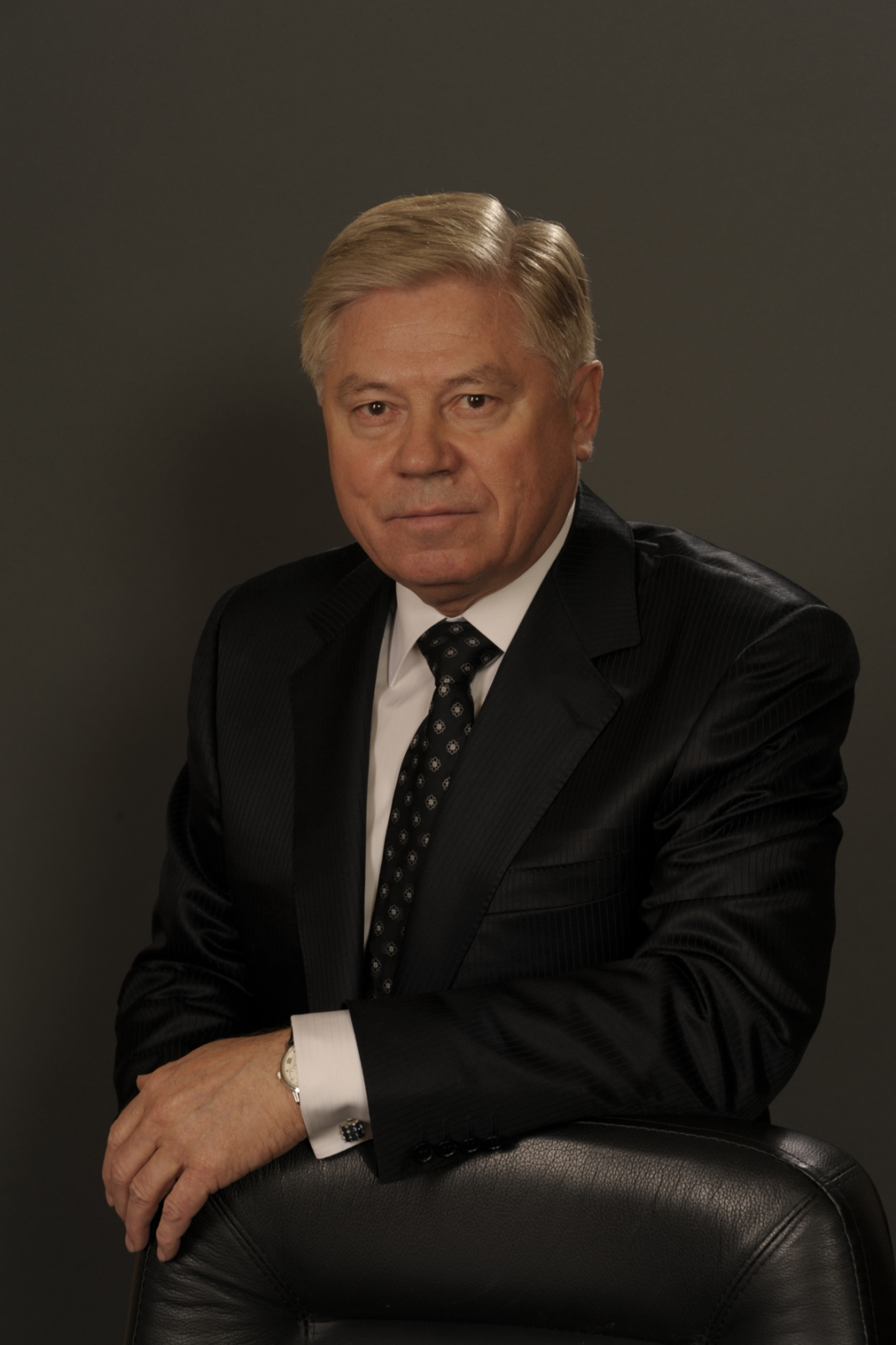
- Official portrait

1st Chief Justice of the Russian Federation
- In office 25 December 1991 – 23 February 2024
- Nominated by: Boris Yeltsin; Vladimir Putin
- Preceded by: Office established
- Succeeded by: Pyotr Serkov (acting); Irina Podnosova

Chief Justice of the Russian SFSR
- In office 26 July 1989 – 16 December 1991
- Preceded by: Yevgeny Smolentsev
- Succeeded by: Office disestablished

Chief Judge of the Moscow City Court
- In office 6 September 1986 – 11 October 1989
- Preceded by: Lev Almazov
- Succeeded by: Zoya Korneva

Personal details
- Born: 14 August 1943 Moscow, USSR
- Died: 23 February 2024 (aged 80) Moscow, Russia
- Resting place: Novodevichy Cemetery, Moscow
- Education: Moscow State University

Vyacheslav Mikhailovich Lebedev (Russian: Вячеслав Михайлович Лебедев; 14 August 1943 – 23 February 2024) was a Russian lawyer and jurist who served as the Chief Justice of Russia from 1989 until his death in 2024.

== Biography ==
Lebedev was born on 14 August 1943 in Moscow. He attended the law faculty of the Lomonosov Moscow State University, which he graduated in 1968.

== Career ==
=== Rise in the Communist Party ===
Lebedev began work in 1969 as a human resources functionary of a department of the Ministry of Industrial Construction of the USSR. In 1970, he was elected as a Judge of the People's District Court for Leningradskiy District in Moscow, and in 1977 he was appointed Chief Judge of the People's District Court for Zheleznodorozhniy District in Moscow. He became deputy Chief Judge of Moscow City Court in 1984, assuming the position of the court's Chief Judge in 1986.

On July 26, 1989, Lebedev was appointed Chairman of the Supreme Court of the RSFSR. In August 1991, as Chairman of the Supreme Court, he did not support the State Committee on the State of Emergency (GKChP). In May 1993, Lebedev was part of the working commission tasked with refining the presidential draft of the Constitution.

== Death ==
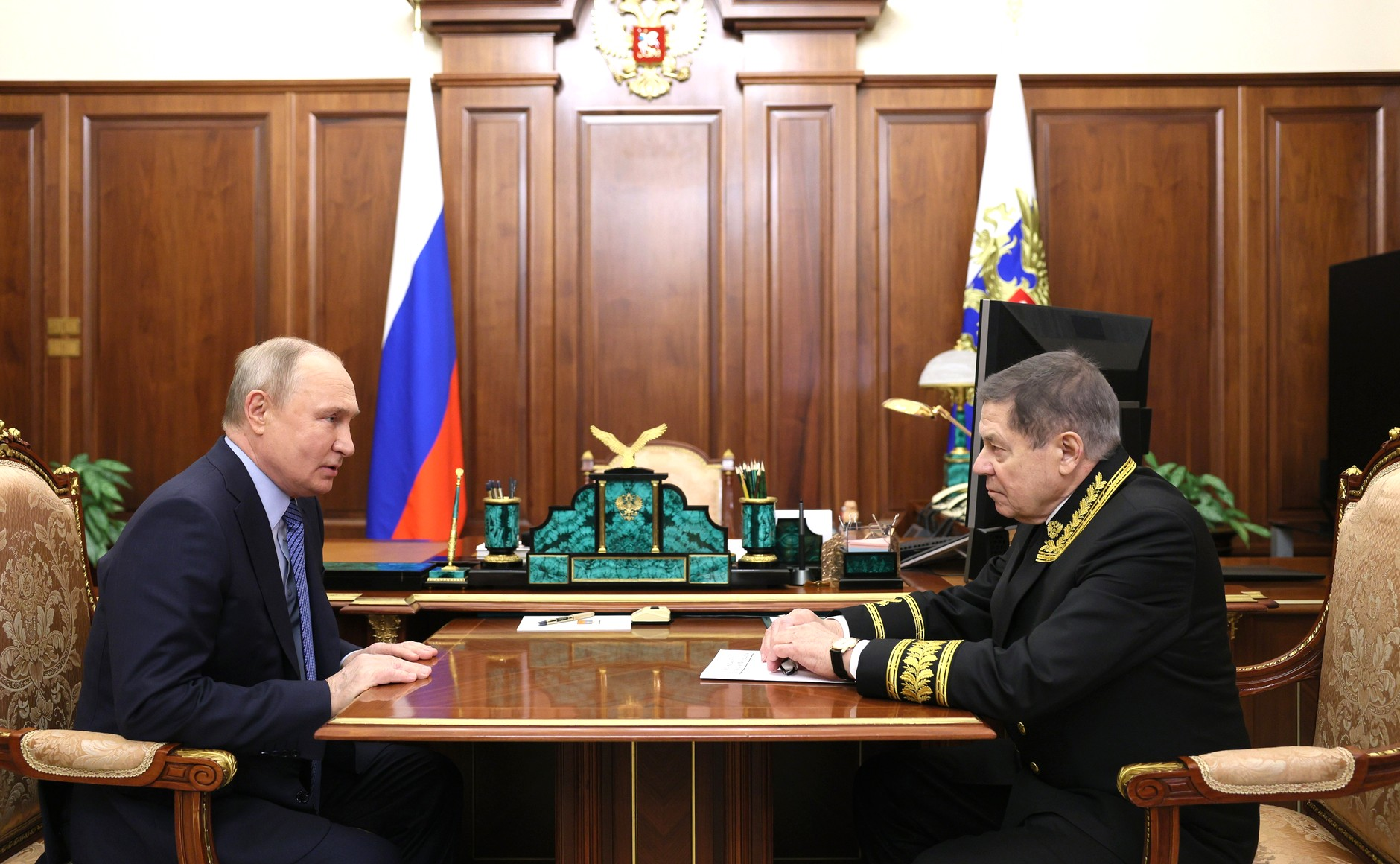
Last meeting with Vladimir Putin, 6 February 2024

Lebedev died in Moscow on the night of 23 February 2024, at the age of 80. He suffered from cancer, and had recently been admitted to hospital.

== Honours ==
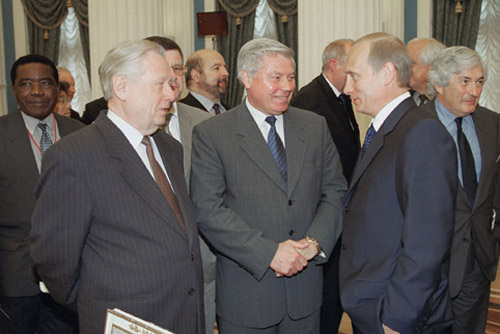
Chief Justice Vyacheslav Lebedev talking to President Vladimir Putin along with the President of the Constitutional Court Marat Baglai, July 9, 2001

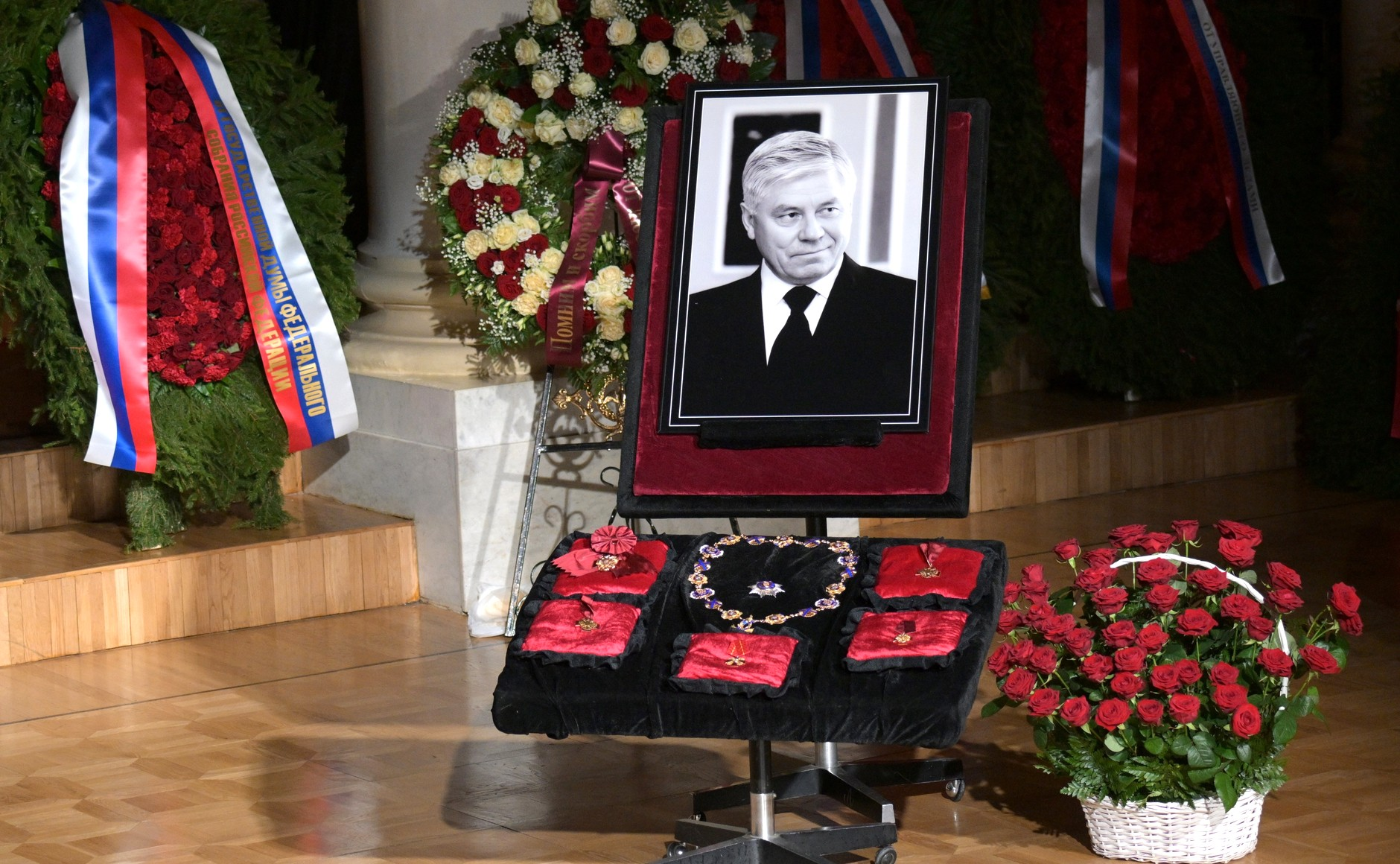
Some of Chief Justice Lebedev's awards at his farewell, 28 February 2024

- (Russia) Russian Federation: Order of St. Andrew (2023)
- (Russia) Russian Federation: Order "For Merit to the Fatherland", 1st class (2018)
- (Russia) Russian Federation: Order "For Merit to the Fatherland", 2nd class (2003)
- (Russia) Russian Federation: Order "For Merit to the Fatherland", 3rd class (1998)'
- (Russia) Russian Federation: Order "For Merit to the Fatherland", 4th class (2013)
- (Russia) Russian Federation: Order of Alexander Nevsky (2012)
- (Russia) Russian Federation: Decoration For Impeccable Service (2020)
- Russian Federation: Honoured Lawyer of Russia (1993)
- (Russia) Russian Federation: Russian Federation Presidential Certificate of Honour (2008)
- (Chechnya) Chechen Republic: Order of Akhmat Kadyrov (2011)
- Ukraine: Order of Prince Yaroslav the Wise (2004)
- Kazakhstan: Order of Friendship, 1st class (2023)
- Kazakhstan: Order of Friendship, 2nd class (2012)
- (Russia) Russian Orthodox Church: Order of St. Sergius of Radonezh, 1st class (2008)
- (Russian Empire) Russian Imperial Family: Knight of the Imperial Order of the White Eagle (2014)
- (Russian Empire) Russian Imperial Family: Knight Grand Cordon of the Imperial Order of Saint Anna (2010)
- (Russian Empire) Russian Imperial Family: Recipient of the 400th Anniversary Medal of the House of Romanov (2013)
- Bulgaria: Honorary Doctor of the Sofia University (2007)
- Philippines: Honorary Doctor of the University of Santo Tomas (2006)

Court offices
Preceded by Himself as the Chief Justice of Russian Soviet Federative Socialist Republic	Chief Justice of the Russian Federation; 1991–2024	Next: Irina Podnosova
