= Certificate of Honor of the Government of the Russian Federation =

Honorary award bestowed by the Government of Russia

Certificate of Honour of the Government of the Russian Federation
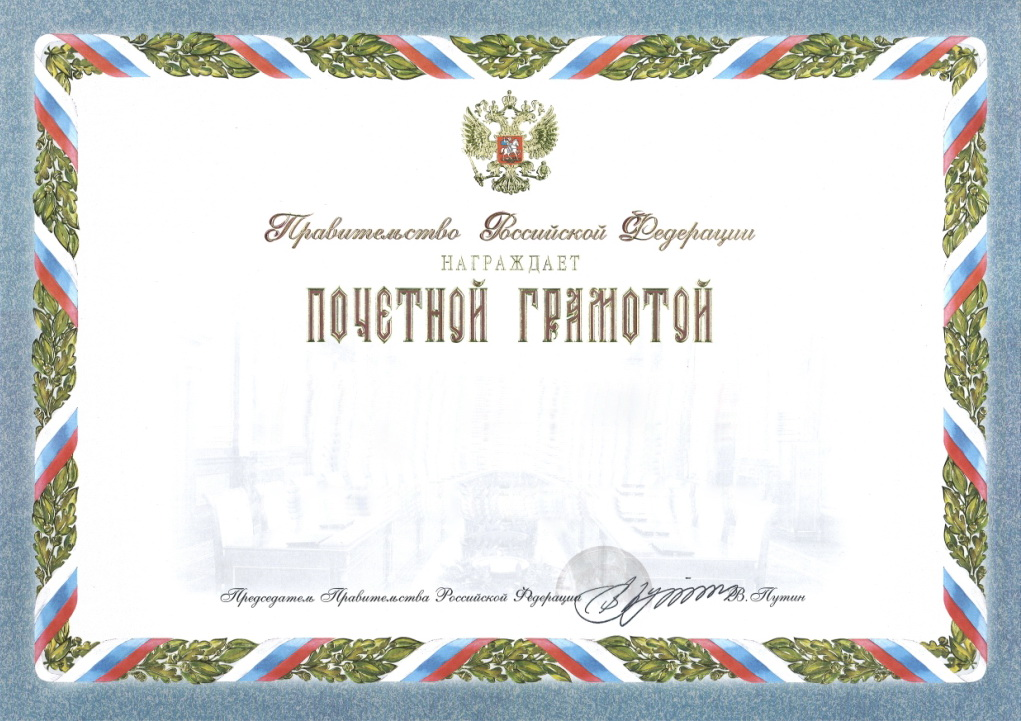
- Certificate of Honour of the Government of the Russian Federation
- Type: State Decoration, Certificate of Honour
- Awarded for: Merit in promoting the social and economic policies of the state
- Presented by: Russian Federation
- Eligibility: Citizens of the Russian Federation (usually with broad public recognition), organizations, and military units
- Status: Active
- Established: May 31, 1995
- Website: government.ru

The Certificate of Honour of the Government of the Russian Federation is a form of encouragement for merit in promoting the social and economic policies of the state.

== History ==
Certificate was established by Decree of the Government of the Russian Federation No. 73 of January 31, 2009, "On the Certificate of Honour of the Government of the Russian Federation and the Letter of Gratitude from the Government of the Russian Federation". This decree approved the Regulations on the Certificate of Honour of the Government of the Russian Federation and on the Letter of Gratitude from the Government of the Russian Federation, a specimen of the certificate form, and a description and drawing of the badge for the certificate.

According to the regulations, the Certificate of Honour of the Government of the Russian Federation is a form of encouragement

for merit in promoting the social and economic policies of the state, the implementation of effective activities of federal state bodies, the development of local self-government, ensuring legality, the rights and freedoms of citizens, strengthening the defense capability of the country and state security, the implementation of the state's foreign policy, as well as the implementation of other powers vested in the Government of the Russian Federation by the Constitution of the Russian Federation, federal constitutional laws, federal laws, and decrees of the President of the Russian Federation.

The certificate is presented by the Chairman of the Government of the Russian Federation or, on their behalf, by members of the Government of the Russian Federation or other officials. Re-awarding of the certificate is not carried out. Duplicates of the certificate and badge are not issued in place of lost ones.

== Badge ==
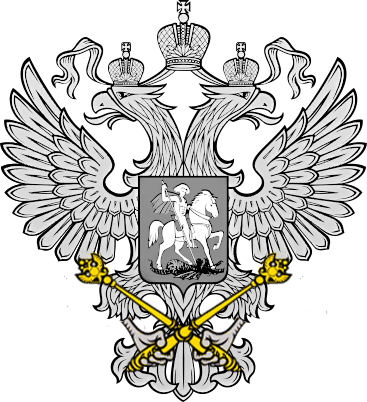
Badge of the Certificate of Honour

The Badge for the Certificate of Honour of the Government of the Russian Federation depicts a double-headed eagle with raised and spread wings. The eagle is crowned with two small crowns and, above them in the center, one large crown. The crowns are connected by a ribbon. The eagle holds crossed scepters in its talons. On the eagle's chest is a shield, in the field of which is a horseman slaying a dragon with a spear. The base of the badge is made of a copper alloy. The badge is made using volumetric casting technology in one level. The image of the eagle has a silver coating, and the scepters are gold-plated. The size of the badge is 16 millimeters. The badge is fastened with a collet clasp. The badge is packaged in a velvet case.
