= Alexey Ilyushenko =

Russian jurist (1957–2021)

- Алексей Ильюшенко
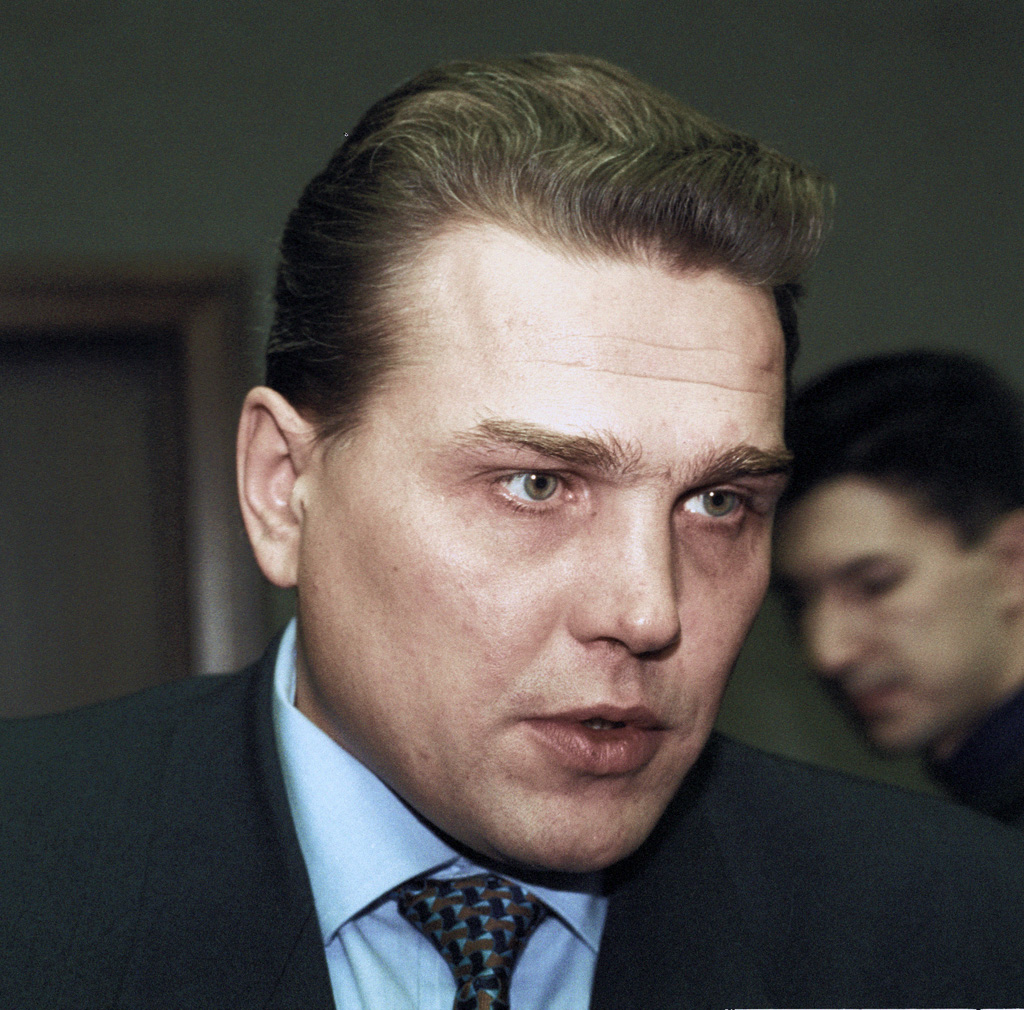
- Ilyushenko in 1994

Acting Prosecutor General of Russia
- In office 26 February 1994 – 8 October 1995
- Preceded by: Alexey Kazannik
- Succeeded by: Yuri Sukratov

Personal details
- Born: 23 September 1957 Anzhero-Sudzhensk, Soviet Union
- Died: 19 August 2021 (aged 63) Moscow, Soviet Union
- Resting place: Troyekurovskoye Cemetery
- Education: Krasnoyarsk State University

Alexey Nikolaevich Ilyushenko (Russian: Алексей Николаевич Ильюшенко; September 23, 1957, Anzhero-Sudzhensk, USSR – August 19, 2021, Moscow, Russia) was a Russian politician, former Acting Prosecutor General of the Russian Federation (from February 26, 1994, to October 8, 1995), and former Head of the Control Directorate of the Presidential Executive Office of the Russian Federation.

== Biography ==
He was born September 23, 1957, in Anzhero-Sudzhensk (Kemerovo Oblast). He graduated from the Law Faculty of Krasnoyarsk State University in 1979. From 1982 to 1984, he served in the Marine Corps in the Far East.

He has worked in the prosecutor's office since 1979 in the following positions: Assistant Prosecutor of the Oktyabrsky District of Krasnoyarsk, Investigator of the Leninsky District Prosecutor's Office of Krasnoyarsk, Assistant Prosecutor of Krasnoyarsk, Deputy Prosecutor of the Kirovsky District of Krasnoyarsk (1986–1989), Prosecutor of the Department of the Prosecutor's Office of the RSFSR for Supervision of Law Enforcement in Police Agencies (1989–1990), Prosecutor of the Department of the Prosecutor's Office of the RSFSR for Supervision of Law Enforcement on Interethnic Relations (1990–1992), Deputy Head of the Department of the Prosecutor General's Office of Russia for Supervision of Law Enforcement on Interethnic Relations (1992–1993).

On March 19, 1993, he was appointed Head of the Control Directorate of the Presidential Executive Office of the Russian Federation.

By decree of Russian President B.N. Yeltsin on February 26, 1994, Ilyushenko was appointed Acting Prosecutor General of the Russian Federation. On March 12, 1994, Yeltsin submitted Ilyushenko's candidacy to the Federation Council of Russia for approval, but his candidacy was rejected by secret ballot. On October 24, 1994, the Federation Council once again rejected Ilyushenko's candidacy, resubmitted by the president.

According to investigator Boris Uvarov, who was assigned to investigate the murder of Vladislav Listyev in March 1995, when he reported to Ilyushenko that the case was practically solved and asked him to sign a series of arrest warrants and search warrants for the suspects, he was immediately forcibly sent on leave.

On October 8, 1995, Yeltsin signed a presidential decree dismissing Ilyushenko from his duties as Prosecutor General of Russia at his request. On November 4, 1995, Ilyushenko was dismissed from the prosecutor's office "due to retirement based on length of service."

On February 15, 1996, Ilyushenko was arrested and placed in the Lefortovo pretrial detention center in connection with a criminal case brought against the firm Balkar-Trading (a deal to sell 25 million tons of Russian oil abroad for 2.7 billion rubles). The Russian Prosecutor General's Office charged Ilyushenko with bribery (Article 173 of the Criminal Code of the RSFSR) and abuse of office (Article 170 of the Criminal Code of the RSFSR). On February 23, 1996, he was charged under these articles. On February 15, 1998, after serving two years in custody, he was released on his own recognizance not to leave the country. The case was sent for further investigation. On May 11, 2001, the criminal case was dismissed due to lack of evidence. During a meeting with Ilyushenko, Prosecutor General Ustinov officially apologized for the lawlessness committed by the previous leadership of the Prosecutor General's Office.

After leaving the prosecutor's office, he held senior positions in the Moscow City Government. On August 9, 2001, he was appointed First Deputy Head of the Department of Nature Management and Environmental Protection of the Moscow City Hall, and on March 27, 2003, he was appointed First Deputy Head of the Department of Property and Land Relations of the Moscow Government.

He died on August 19, 2021, in Moscow after a serious illness. He is buried at Troyekurovskoye Cemetery.
