= Moscow City Court =

Russian judicial body

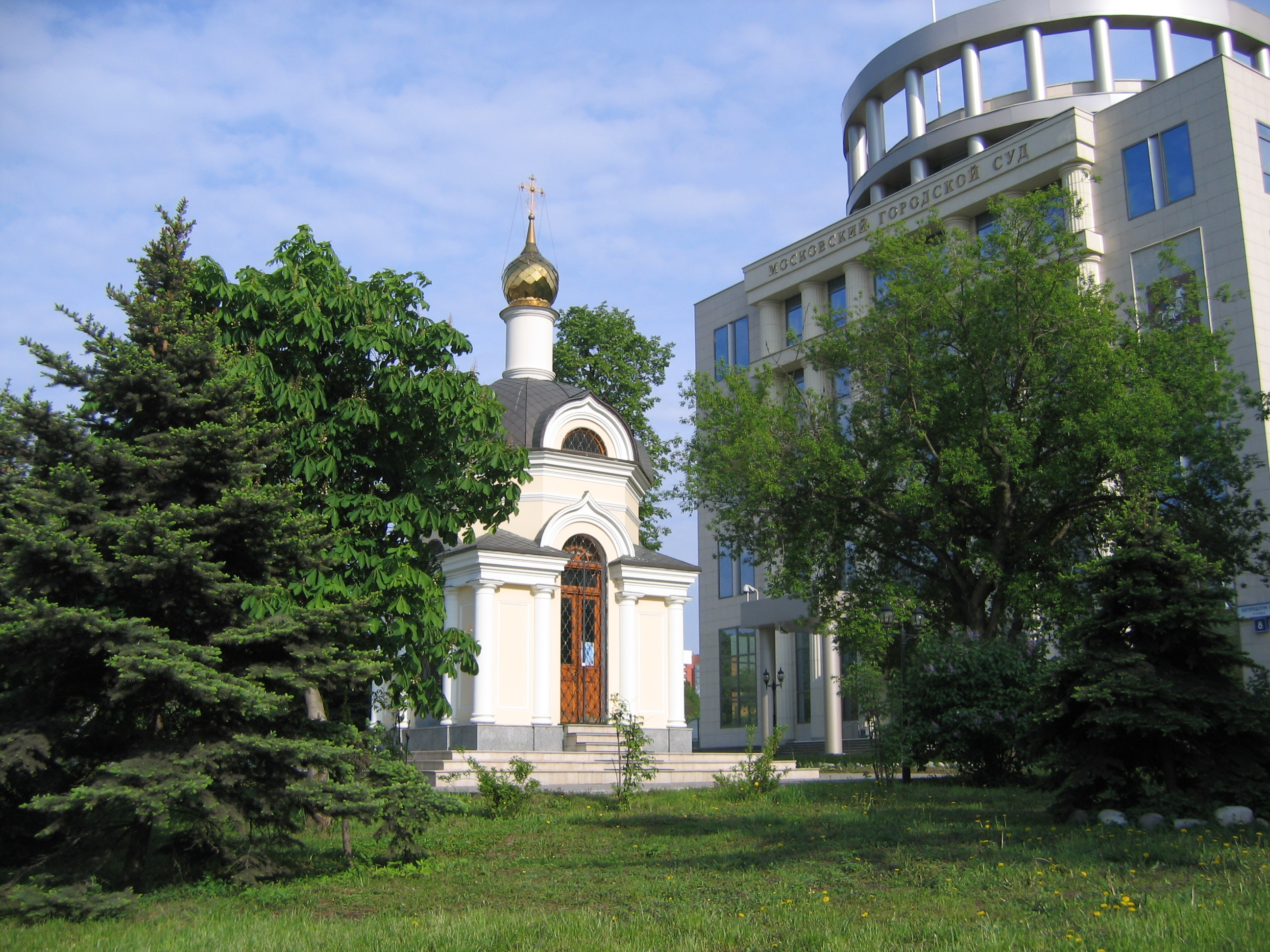
- Established: 13 December 1932
- Location: Moscow, Bogorodsky Val street, 8
- Website: mos-gorsud.ru

Chief Judge
- Currently: Mikhail Ptitsyn
- Since: 2020

The Moscow City Court (Russian: Московский городской суд (Мосгорсуд), romanized: Moskovsky gorodskoy sud (Mosgorsud)) is the highest judicial body of the city of Moscow on civil, criminal, administrative and other cases.

== District courts of Moscow ==
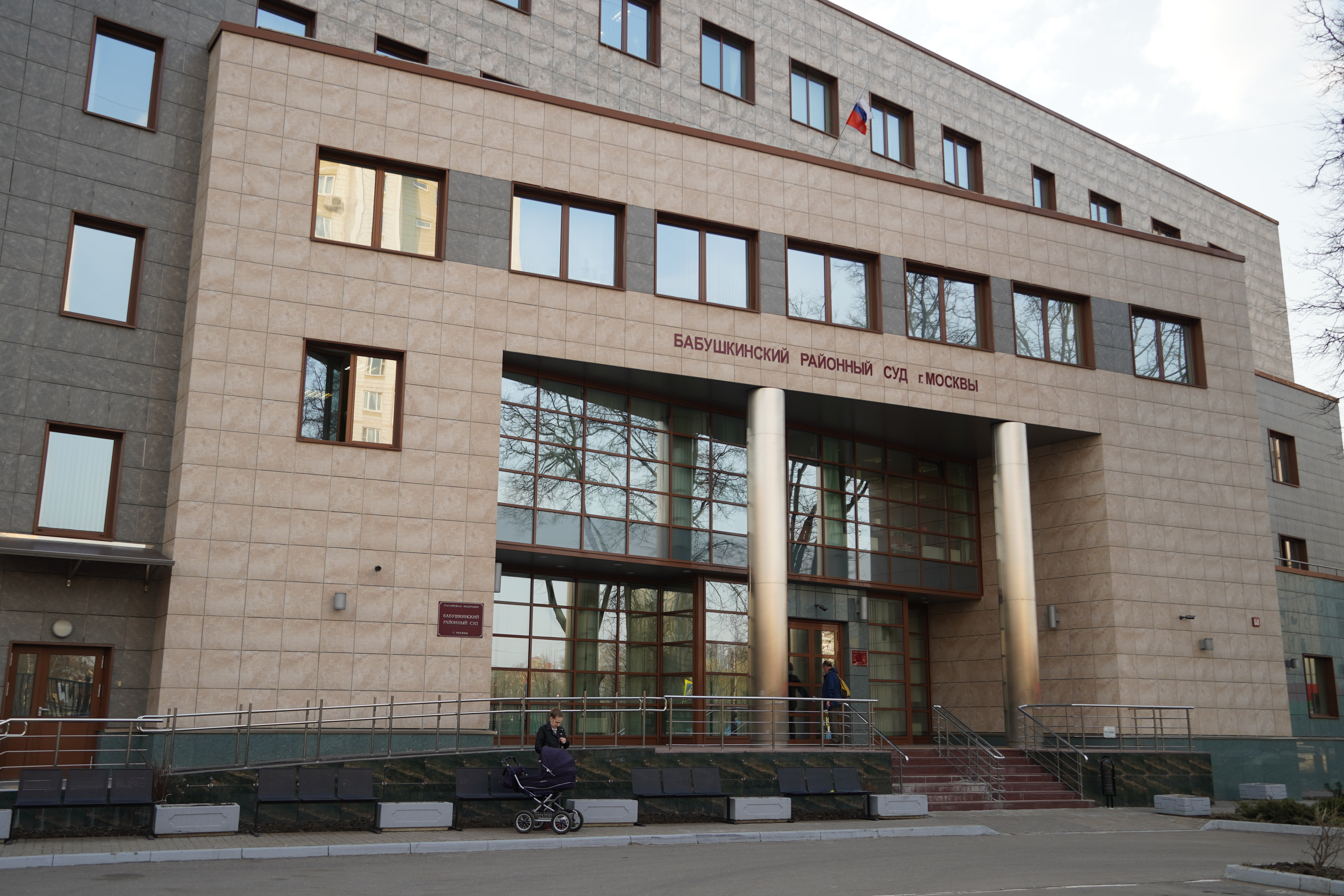
Babyshkinsky District Court of Moscow

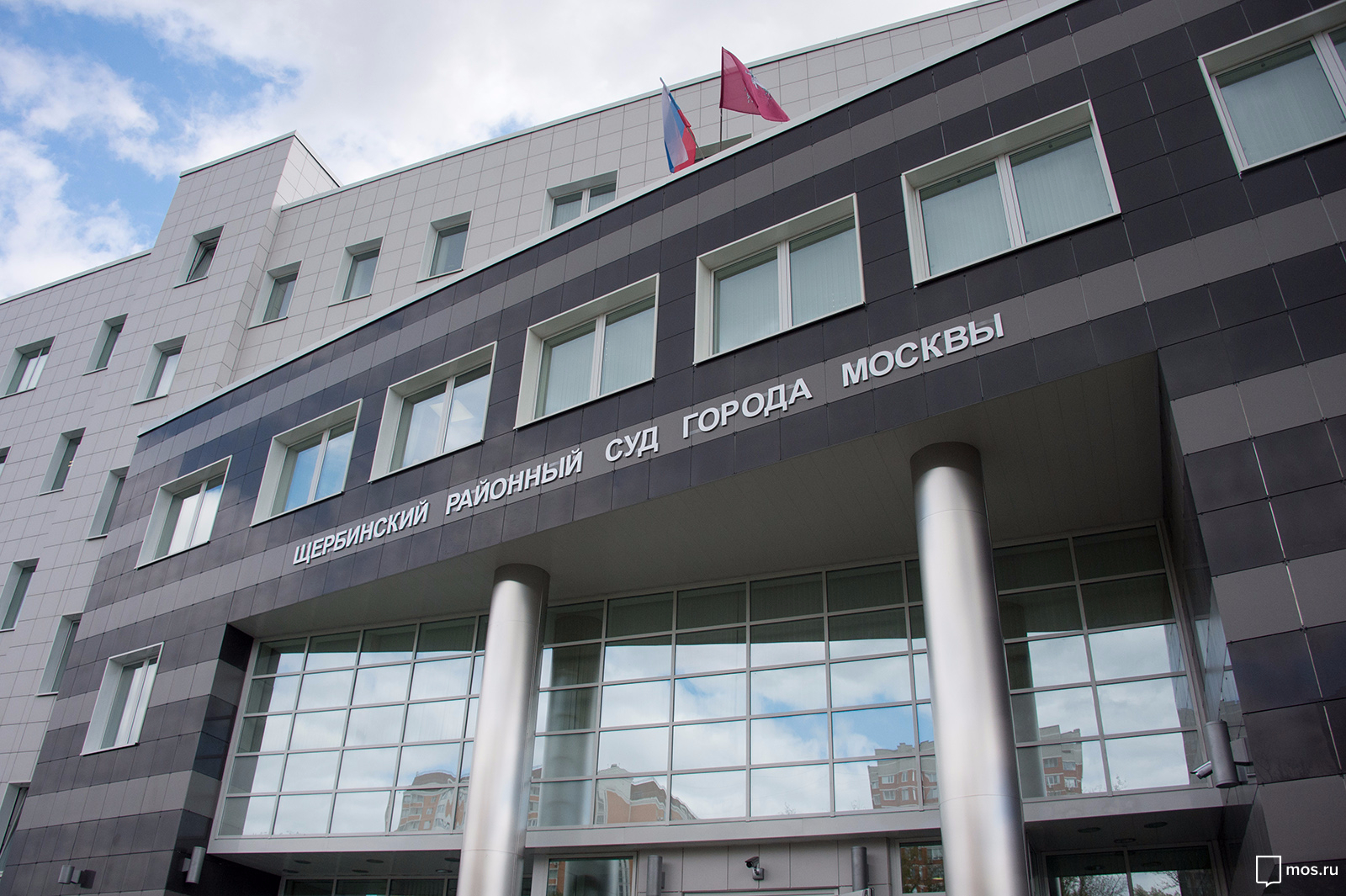
Sherbinsky District Court of Moscow

- Babyshkinsky District Court of Moscow
- Basmanny District Court of Moscow
- Butyrsky District Court of Moscow
- Gagarinsky District Court of Moscow
- Golovinsky District Court of Moscow
- Dorogomilovsky District Court of Moscow
- Zamoskvoreczky District Court of Moscow
- Zelenogradsky District Court of Moscow
- Zyuzinsky District Court of Moscow
- Izmailovsky District Court of Moscow
- Koptevsky District Court of Moscow
- Kuzminsky District Court of Moscow
- Kunczevsky District Court of Moscow
- Lefortovsky District Court of Moscow
- Lyublinsky District Court of Moscow
- Meshchansky District Court of Moscow
- Nagatinsky District Court of Moscow
- Nikulinsky District Court of Moscow
- Ostankinsky District Court of Moscow
- Perovsky District Court of Moscow
- Preobrazhensky District Court of Moscow
- Presnensky District Court of Moscow
- Savyolovsky District Court of Moscow
- Simonovsky District Court of Moscow
- Solntsevo District Court of Moscow
- Tagansky District Court of Moscow
- Tverskoy District Court of Moscow
- Timiryazevsky District Court of Moscow
- Tushino District Court of Moscow
- Troitsky District Court of Moscow
- Khamovniki District Court of Moscow
- Khoroshyovsky District Court of Moscow
- Cheryomushki District Court of Moscow
- Chertanovo District Court of Moscow
- Shcherbinka District Court of Moscow
