= Prosecutor General of Russia =

Key figure in the Russian judicial system

Prosecutor General of the Russian Federation
- Генеральный Прокурор Российской Федерации (Russian)

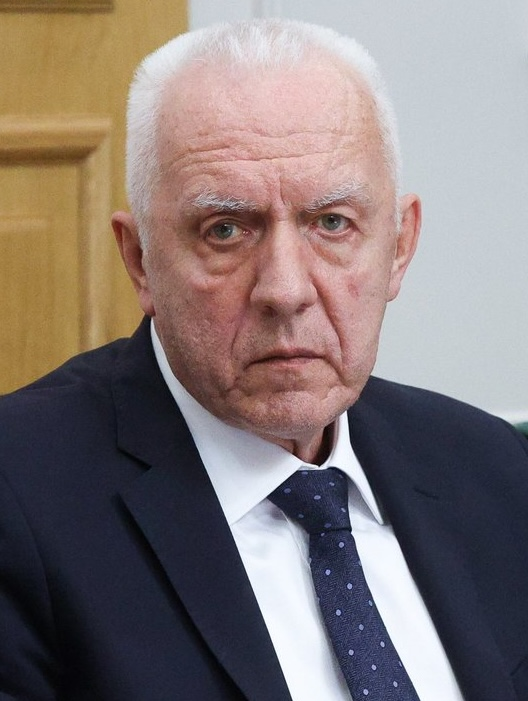
- Incumbent; Aleksandr Gutsan since 24 September 2025
- Office of the Prosecutor General of the Russian Federation
- Type: Public procurator
- Nominator: President of Russia
- Appointer: Federation Council
- Term length: Five years
- Precursor: Procurator General of the Soviet Union
- Formation: 28 February 1991
- First holder: Valentin Stepankov
- Unofficial names: Attorney General of Russia
- Website: genproc.gov.ru (in Russian)

The Prosecutor General of Russia (also Attorney General of Russia, Russian: Генеральный прокурор Российской Федерации, romanized: Generalʹnyy prokuror Rossiyskoy Federatsii) heads the system of official prosecution in courts and heads the Office of the Prosecutor General of the Russian Federation. The Prosecutor General remains one of the most powerful component of the Russian judicial system.

== Mission ==
The Office of the Prosecutor General is entrusted with:

1. prosecution in court on behalf of the State;
2. representation of the interests of a citizen or of the State in court in cases determined by law;
3. supervision of the observance of laws by bodies that conduct detective and search activity, inquiry and pretrial investigation;
4. supervision of the observance of laws in the execution of judicial decisions in criminal cases, and also in the application of other measures of coercion related to the restraint of personal liberty of citizens.

The Prosecutor General leads the General Prosecutor's Office of Russian Federation. The prosecutor's offices of subjects of Russian Federation are subordinate to the General Prosecutor's Office of Russian Federation, and the prosecutor's offices of cities and raions are subordinate to the prosecutor's offices of subjects of Russian Federation. There are specialized prosecutor's offices (environmental prosecutor's offices, penitentiary prosecutor's offices, transport prosecutor's offices, closed cities prosecutor's offices) which are subordinate to the General Prosecutor's Office of Russian Federation and have own subordinated prosecutor's offices. Finally, there is the Chief Military Prosecutor's Office of Russian Federation which is subordinated to the General Prosecutor's Office of Russian Federation and have own subordinated military prosecutor's offices (military prosecutor's office of Western Military District, military prosecutor's office of Eastern Military District, military prosecutor's office of Southern Military District, military prosecutor's office of Central Military District, military prosecutor's office of Northern Fleet, military prosecutor's office of Baltic Fleet, military prosecutor's office of Black Sea Fleet, military prosecutor's office of Pacific Fleet, military prosecutor's office of Strategic Missile Forces and Moscow city military prosecutor's office) which in turn have own subordinated military prosecutor's offices (garrison military prosecutor's offices).

Prosecutors in a broad sense are directly prosecutors (who leads prosecutor's offices), their deputies, senior assistants and junior assistants. All of them are federal government officials, have special ranks (Russian: классные чины) and wear special uniform with shoulder insignia. Military prosecutors (in a broad sense) are military personnel, have military ranks of commissioned officers and wear military uniform with shoulder insignia but they are not subordinate to any military authority (excepting higher military prosecutor).

== Appointment ==
The Prosecutor General is nominated to the office by the President of Russia and approved by the majority of Federation Council of Russia (the Upper House of the Russian Parliament). If the nominee is not approved, then the President must nominate another candidate within 30 days (article 12 of the Federal Law about the Office of the Prosecutor General of Russian Federation). The term of authority of the Prosecutor General is five years. The resignation of the Prosecutor General before the end of their term should be approved by both the majority of Federation Council of Russia and the President.

== Constitutional independence ==
The Prosecutor General and their office are independent from the Executive, Legislative and Judicial branches of government. The Investigative Committee of Russia, sometimes described as the "Russian FBI", is the main federal investigating authority in Russia, formed in place of the Investigative Committee of the Prosecutor General in 2011.

== List of prosecutors general ==
Denotes service as acting prosecutors general prior to appointment or after resignation

No.	Portrait	Name (Born-Died)	Term of office			Ref.
No.	Portrait	Name (Born-Died)	Took office	Left office	Time in office	Ref.
1	Valentin Stepankov	Valentin Stepankov (born 1951)	28 February 1991	5 October 1993	2 years, 219 days	–
2	Alexey Kazannik	Alexey Kazannik (1941–2019)	5 October 1993	14 March 1994	160 days	–
–	Alexey Ilyushenko	Alexey Ilyushenko (1957–2021); Acting	26 March 1994	8 October 1995	1 year, 196 days	–
–	Oleg Gaydanov [ru]	Oleg Gaydanov (born 1945); Acting	8 October 1995	24 October 1995	16 days	–
3	Yury Skuratov	Yury Skuratov (born 1952)	24 October 1995	2 February 1999	3 years, 101 days	–
–	Yury Chaika	Yury Chaika (born 1951); Acting	2 February 1999	6 August 1999	185 days	–
–	Vladimir Ustinov	Vladimir Ustinov (born 1953); Acting	6 August 1999	17 May 2000	285 days	–
4	Vladimir Ustinov	Vladimir Ustinov (born 1953)	17 May 2000	2 June 2006	6 years, 16 days	–
5	Yury Chaika	Yury Chaika (born 1951)	23 June 2006	22 January 2020	13 years, 213 days	–
6	Igor Krasnov	Igor Krasnov (born 1975)	22 January 2020	24 September 2025	5 years, 245 days	
7	Aleksandr Gutsan	Aleksandr Gutsan (born 1960)	24 September 2025	Incumbent	1 year, 22 days	–

== See also ==
- Prosecutor General of the USSR
- Ministry of Justice of the USSR
- List of Justice Ministers of Imperial Russia
- List of Prosecutors General of Russia
- Federal Penitentiary Service
- Crime in Russia
- Prosecution Service of Russia class rate insignia
