= John N. Hazard =

- Born: John Newbold Hazard; 5 January 1909; Syracuse, N.Y.
- Died: 7 April 1995 (aged 86); New York, United States
- Education: Yale (B.A.); Harvard Law School (LL.B.); University of Chicago (J.S.D.)
- Occupations: legal scholar; educator
- Employer(s): Lend-Lease Administration; Columbia University

John N. Hazard (1909–1995) was a leading American scholar of Soviet law and public administration. Hazard was one of the pioneers in the field of Sovietology, particularly in Soviet law, administration and politics.

== Early life ==
Hazard was born in Syracuse, N.Y., Jan. 5, 1909. He earned the A.B. from Yale in 1930, the LL.B. from Harvard in 1934 and the J.S.D. (Doctor of Juristic Science) from the University of Chicago in 1939.

His career as an American Sovietologist began shortly after the United States recognized the government of the USSR in 1933.

== Career ==
Upon his graduation from Harvard Law School in 1934, he was sent by the Institute of Current World Affairs as the first American to study Soviet law at the Moscow Juridical Institute, later the Institute of State and Law. Only a handful of scholars were concerned with Russian diplomacy and business then, and scholarship on Russia was limited principally to historical studies. He approached the field of Soviet law as a pioneer and received the certificate of the Juridical Institute in 1937.

=== Soviet desk ===
When World War II broke out, Hazard joined the U.S. government and was assigned to the Soviet desk in the Division of Defense Aid Reports.

He helped negotiate the conditions under which the Soviet Union joined the Lend-Lease program as its major recipient. He became deputy director of the Soviet branch of the Lend-Lease Administration, through which the United States furnished food, machinery and services to its allies.

As an expert on the USSR, Hazard accompanied Vice President Henry Wallace on his secret mission to China in May 1944.

The following year he was chosen as an expert on Soviet law to assist Justice Robert Jackson in preparing the prosecution of Nazi leaders to be brought before an international tribunal for war crimes.

=== Columbia University ===
With his return to civilian life in 1946, he joined the Columbia faculty. Along with four other scholars, Hazard was a founder of the Russian Institute at Columbia University, now the Harriman Institute, the first academic center in America dedicated to Russian-Soviet studies. He also was a founder of the American Association for the Advancement of Slavic Studies, the first American professional organization in the field.

He was appointed professor of public law at the same time, beginning a teaching career that spanned two generations. He became the Nash Professor of Law in the Columbia Law School, received emeritus status in 1977 and continued to teach each semester until 1994.

He was associated with the Parker School of Foreign and Comparative Law at Columbia and helped shape its programs in Russian and East European law. He was the editor in chief of the Parker School Journal of East European Law, the leading journal in the field. The John N. Hazard Memorial Fellowship at Columbia's Harriman Institute exists to fund scholars researching Soviet and Russian law.

John N. Hazard was the mentor of famous Sovietologist Harold J. Berman.

== Scholarship ==
Hazard's books cover both political science and law. His textbook, The Soviet System of Government, first published by University of Chicago Press in 1957, has been republished in five editions and several languages. Other books include Soviet Housing Law (1939), Law and Social Change in the USSR (1953), Settling Disputes in Soviet Society (1960), The Soviet System of Government (1957), Communists and Their Law (1969), Managing Change in the USSR (1983), and Recollections of a Pioneer Sovietologist (1983). Many of his volumes are still in wide use in comparative law courses.

=== Affiliations ===
- International Academy of Comparative Law
- British Academy (since 1975)
- International Association of Legal Sciences
- American Foreign Law Association
- American Branch of the International Law Association
- American Society of International Law
- American Philosophical Society (since 1972)
- American Academy of Arts and Sciences (since 1976)

== See also ==
- List of Russian legal historians
- Russian legal history
