= Maria Evgenyevna Grabar-Passek =

Russian classical philologist and translator (1893–1975)

Maria Grabar-Passek
- Мария Грабарь-Пассек
- Born: Maria Evgenyevna Passek; 28 October 1893; Yuryev, Russian Empire (now Tartu, Estonia)
- Died: 23 December 1975 (aged 82); Moscow, Russian SFSR, Soviet Union
- Resting place: Vagankovo Cemetery
- Spouse: Vladimir Grabar
- Awards: Order of the Red Banner of Labour (1945)

Academic work
- Discipline: Classical philology
- Institutions: Institute of World Literature
- Doctoral students: Mikhail Gasparov, Aza Takho-Godi

Maria Evgenyevna Grabar-Passek (Russian: Мария Евгеньевна Грабарь-Пассек, née Passek; 28 October 1893 – 23 December 1975) was a Soviet classical philologist and translator of ancient Greek and Latin literature. From 1946 she worked at the Institute of World Literature in Moscow, and she taught the postwar generation of Russian classicists that included Mikhail Gasparov and Aza Takho-Godi.

== Life ==
Grabar-Passek grew up in Yuryev, where her father taught Roman law and served as elected rector of the university. On her mother's side she was a niece of the writer Alexander Amfiteatrov. She finished the Moscow higher courses for women in 1917 and that spring married her father's colleague Vladimir Grabar, the elder brother of the painter Igor Grabar. The couple settled in Moscow in 1922.

Classics were out of fashion in the young Soviet state, so for two decades Grabar-Passek earned her living teaching German, first at Moscow military academies and then, until the mid 1950s, at the language courses of the Soviet Foreign Ministry. In December 1945 she translated passages from Alfred Rosenberg's The Myth of the Twentieth Century and other Nazi racial writings for the Soviet prosecutors at the Nuremberg trials, and was decorated with the Order of the Red Banner of Labour.

The reopening of the classical philology chair in Moscow in 1934 let her return to Greek and Latin. She taught at the Moscow Institute of Philosophy, Literature and History and later at Moscow University, defended her doctorate Theocritus and his ancient followers in 1943, and joined the classical sector of the Institute of World Literature in 1946, where she stayed until her death.

== Scholarship and translations ==
Together with Sergei Sobolevsky and Fyodor Petrovsky, Grabar-Passek co-edited the standard Soviet History of Greek Literature and History of Roman Literature. She also wrote the chapter on early Hellenistic poetry, jointly with Mikhail Gasparov, for the eight-volume History of World Literature (1983).

Her verse translation of Theocritus, begun in the early 1920s at the urging of Yevgeny Tarle, came out with Moschus and Bion in 1958 and is still the standard Russian text. She edited and part-translated Cicero. Speeches (1962), Late Greek Prose (1960) and Alexandrian Poetry (1972), and put Pindar, Callimachus, Claudian and Ausonius into Russian. The 1972 anthology inspired David Samoylov's poem "Imitation of Theocritus", dedicated to her memory.

Gasparov reprinted his memoir of her in Zapisi i vypiski (2001), placing her among the teachers who had formed him.
