= John B. Quigley =

John B. Quigley (born 1940) is a professor of law at the Moritz College of Law at the Ohio State University, where he is the Presidents' Club Professor of Law Emeritus. In 1995 he was recipient of the Ohio State University Distinguished Scholar Award. Born John Bernard Quigley Jr., he was raised in St. Louis, Missouri and educated at the St. Louis Country Day School. He graduated from Harvard in the class of 1962, later taking an LL.B degree from Harvard Law School in 1966 and an M.A., also awarded in 1966. He was admitted to the bar in Massachusetts in 1967. Before joining the Ohio State faculty in 1969, he was a research scholar at Moscow State University, and a research associate in comparative law at Harvard Law School. Professor Quigley teaches international law and comparative law. Professor Quigley holds an adjunct appointment in the Political Science Department. In 1982–83 he was a visiting professor at the University of Dar es Salaam, Tanzania.

John Quigley is active in international human rights work. He has published many articles and books on human rights, the United Nations, war and peace, east European law, African law, and the Arab–Israeli conflict. He is fluent in Russian and French and highly proficient in Spanish and Swahili.

== Bibliography ==
- Basic Laws on the Structure of the Soviet State (with H. J. Berman), Harvard University Press, 1969
- The Merchant Shipping Code of the USSR (1968) (with W. E. Butler), Johns Hopkins University Press, 1970
- The Soviet Foreign Trade Monopoly: Institutions and Laws, Ohio State University Press, 1974
- Law After Revolution: Essays on Socialist Law in Honor of Harold J. Berman (edited) (with William E. Butler and Peter B. Maggs), Oceana Publications, 1988
- Palestine and Israel: A Challenge to Justice, Duke University Press, 1990
- The Ruses for War: American Interventionism Since World War II, Prometheus Books, 1992
- Flight into the Maelstrom: Immigration to Israel and Middle East Peace, Ithaca Press, 1997
- Genocide in Cambodia: Documents from the Trial of Pol Pot and Ieng Sary (edited, with Howard J. DeNike and Kenneth J. Robinson), University of Pennsylvania Press, 2000
- The Case for Palestine: An International Law Perspective, Duke University Press, 2005
- The Genocide Convention: An International Law Analysis, Ashgate Publishing Ltd, 2006
- The Statehood of Palestine, Cambridge University Press, 2011
- The Six-Day War and Israeli Self-Defense: Questioning the Legal Basis for Preventive War, Cambridge University Press, 2013
- The International Diplomacy of Israel's Founders, Cambridge University Press, 2016
- The Legality of a Jewish State: A Century of Debate Over Rights in Palestine, Cambridge University Press, 2021
- Britain and Its Mandate Over Palestine: Legal Chicanery on a World Stage, Anthem Press, 2022

Faculty digests:

- To Combat Terrorism, U.S. Must Re-Examine Foreign Policy, "Identifying the Origins of Anti-American Terrorism," Florida Law Review, 2006 (56 Fla. L. Rev. 1003)
- Courts Should Recognize Treaty-Based Rights, "Toward More Effective Judicial Implementation of Treaty-Based Rights," Fordham International Law Journal, 2006 (29 Fordham Int'l L.J. 552)
- Palestinian Crisis Best Understood Under International Law "International Law and the Palestinian Refugees," Hastings International and Comparative Law Review, 2005

== See also ==
- List of Russian legal historians
- Russian legal history
