= Adam Ulam =

American historian (1922–2000)

Adam Bruno Ulam
- Adam Ulam
- Born: April 8, 1922; Lwów, Poland (now Lviv, Ukraine)
- Died: March 28, 2000 (aged 77); Cambridge, Massachusetts, U.S.
- Resting place: Mount Auburn Cemetery, Cambridge, Massachusetts, U.S.
- Citizenship: Polish (before 1939), American (from 1939)
- Education: Brown University, Harvard University
- Occupations: Political scientist, historian, Sovietologist, Kremlinologist, author
- Spouse: Mary Hamilton (Molly) Burgwin Ulam (m. 1963, divorced 1991)
- Children: Alexander Stanislaw Ulam; Joseph Howard Ulam
- Relatives: Stanislaw Ulam (brother)
- Writing career
- Language: English, Polish, Russian
- Genres: Non-fiction, political history, political philosophy
- Subjects: Political Science, History, Sovietology, Kremlinology, Education
- Notable works: Expansion and Coexistence: The History of Soviet Foreign Policy, 1917-67 (1968); Idealism and the Development of English Socialism (Ph.D. thesis, 1947)
- Notable awards: Delancey K. Jay Prize of Harvard University (1947)
- Website: adamulam.org

Adam Bruno Ulam (8 April 1922 – 28 March 2000) was a Polish-American historian of Jewish descent and political scientist at Harvard University. Ulam was one of the world's foremost authorities and top experts in Sovietology and Kremlinology. He authored multiple books and articles in these academic disciplines.

== Biography ==
Adam B. Ulam was born on April 8, 1922, in Lwów (then a major city in Poland; now Lviv in Ukraine), to the parents of a wealthy well-assimilated Jewish family. After graduating from high school, on or around August 20, 1939, his 13-years-older brother Stanisław Ulam, a famous mathematician and key contributor to the Manhattan Project, took him to the United States to continue his education. Their father had, at the last minute, changed their departure date from September 3 to August 20, most likely saving Adam's life since on September 1 the Second World War began, with Nazi Germany's invasion of Poland. Apart from the brothers Ulam, all other family members who remained in Poland were murdered in the Holocaust.

Adam had United States citizenship by 1939, and tried to enlist in the US army twice after the United States entered the war, but was rejected at first for having "relatives living in enemy territory" and later for myopia. He studied at Brown University and taught briefly at University of Wisconsin–Madison. After studies at Harvard University (1944–1947), he got a doctoral degree under William Yandell Elliott for his thesis Idealism and the Development of English Socialism, which was awarded the 1947 Delancey K. Jay Prize. He became a faculty member at Harvard in 1947, he received tenure in 1954, and until his retirement in 1992 was Gurney Professor of History and Political Science. He directed the Russian Research Center (1973–1974) and was a research associate for the Center for International Studies at the Massachusetts Institute of Technology (1953–1955). He was a member of both the American Academy of Arts and Sciences and the American Philosophical Society.

He married in 1963, divorced in 1991, and had two sons. On March 28, 2000, he died from lung cancer in Cambridge, Massachusetts, at the age of 77, and was buried at the Mount Auburn Cemetery.

== Works ==
Ulam authored multiple books and articles, and his writings were primarily dedicated to Sovietology, Kremlinology and the Cold War. His best-known book is Expansion and Coexistence: The History of Soviet Foreign Policy, 1917–67 (1968).

In his first book, Titoism and the Cominform (1952), based on his doctoral thesis, he argued that Communists' focus on certain goals blinded them to disastrous socioeconomic side effects that had the capacity to weaken their hold on power. His book The Unfinished Revolution: An Essay on the Sources of Influence of Marxism and Communism (1960) explored Marxist thought. His two books The Bolsheviks: The Intellectual and Political History of the Triumph of Communism in Russia (1965) and Stalin: The Man and His Era (1973) are internationally recognized as the standard biographies of Vladimir Lenin and Joseph Stalin, respectively. He also wrote two sequels, The Rivals: America and Russia since World War II (1971) and Dangerous Relations: The Soviet Union in World Politics, 1970–1982 (1983).

He also wrote a novel, The Kirov Affair (1988), about the Soviet 1930s. In one of his last books, The Communists: The Story of Power and Lost Illusions 1948-1991, published in 1992, the year he retired, he commented on the fall of the Soviet Union, writing that Communists fell from power because their ideology was misguided and the governing elites' growing awareness of their error led to their demoralization, which in turn fed growing tensions and conflicts within and between Communist states.

The major exceptions in his book publications were Philosophical Foundations of English Socialism and The Fall of the American University, a critique of U.S. higher education, written in 1972.

== Books ==
Many of the books are online and free to borrow for two weeks

- Titoism and the Cominform (1952)
- Patterns of Government: The Major Political Systems of Europe, with Samuel H. Beer, Harry H. Eckstein, Herbert J. Spiro, and Nicholas Wahl, edited with S.H. Beer (1958)
- The Unfinished Revolution: An Essay on the Sources of Influence of Marxism and Communism (1960), online
- The New Face of Soviet Totalitarianism (1963)
- Philosophical Foundations of English Socialism (1964)
- The Bolsheviks: The Intellectual and Political History of the Triumph of Communism in Russia (1965)
- Expansion and Coexistence, The History of Soviet Foreign Policy, 1917–67 (1968), online
- The Rivals. America and Russia since World War II (1971), online
- The Fall of the American University (1972)
- Stalin: The Man and His Era (1973), online
- The Russian Political System (1974), online
- Ideologies and Illusions: Revolutionary Thought from Herzen to Solzhenitsyn (1976), online
- In the Name of the People: Prophets and Conspirators in Prerevolutionary Russia (1977), online
- Russia's Failed Revolutions: From the Decembrists to the Dissidents (1981)
- Dangerous Relations: Soviet Union in World Politics, 1970–82 (1983)
- The Kirov Affair (1988) - note: a novel, online
- The Communists: The Story of Power and Lost Illusions, 1948–1991 (1992)
- A History of Soviet Russia (1997)
- Understanding the Cold War: A Historian's Personal Reflections (2000), a memoir
