= List of Russian legal historians =

Russian legal historians, scholars who study Russian law in historical perspective, include:

- Harold J. Berman (1918–2007), Harvard law professor and expert on Russian law
- William E. Butler (1939–), distinguished professor of law at Dickinson School of Law, Penn State University
- Boris Chicherin (1828–1904), Russian jurist and political philosopher
- Ferdinand Feldbrugge (1933–), professor of international law at Leiden University, former Dean of Law Faculty of Leiden University and leading sovietologist. Editor of Encyclopedia of Soviet Law and author of Medieval History of Russia (Nijhoff, 2009)
- V.E. Grabar, author of influential History of International Law in Russia (1847–1917)
- Aleksandr Gradovsky (1841–1889), Russian jurist
- John N. Hazard (1909–1995), leading American sovietologist and expert on Russian law
- Dmitri Kachenovsky (1827–1872), influential liberal jurist in Russia
- Leonid Alekseevich Kamarovsky (1846–1912), professor of international law at Moscow State University
- Konstantin Kavelin (1818–1885), Russian historian, jurist, and sociologist
- Nikolay Korkunov (1855–1904), professor for constitutional and international law at the University of Saint Petersburg
- Evgeny A. Korovin (1892–1964), professor of international law, Moscow State University
- Maksim Kovalevsky (1851–1916), professor of legal history at St. Petersburg University
- Friedrich Martens (1845–1909), considered the Russian "father" of modern international law
- V.A. Nezabitovsky (1824–1883), jurist at Kiev University
- Evgeny Pashukanis (1891–1937), head of Soviet Institute of State and Law, executed by Stalin in the Great Purge
- Iosif Alekseyevich Pokrovsky (1868–1920), Russian lawyer, professor, and doctor of Roman law
- William E. Pomeranz (1960–), adjunct professor at Georgetown University and Director of the Kennan Institute at the Woodrow Wilson International Center for Scholars
- John Quigley (academic) (1940–), professor of law at the Moritz College of Law at the Ohio State University
- Dmitry Samokvasov (1843–1911), Russian archaeologist and legal historian
- Peter Berngardovich Struve (1870–1944), father of legal Marxism
- Mikhail Taube (1869–1961), scholar of international law
- Grigory Tunkin (1906–1993), professor of international law at Moscow State University

== See also ==
- Law of the Russian Federation
- List of scholars in Russian law
- List of Russian historians
