= Academic Law Institute =

Coordinates: 55.756°N 37.618°E

Academic Law Institute (Institute of State and Law/RAS)
- Академический правовой институт (АПИ)
- Type: Private
- Established: 1993
- Rector: Khamaneva, Natalia Iurievna
- Students: 120
- Location: ul. Znamenka 10 119841, Moscow, Russia
- Website: www.igpran.ru/en

The Academic Law Institute (Russian: Академический правовой институт (АПИ); translit: Akademichiskii Pravovoi Institut, API) is a private law school founded in 1993 under the auspices of the Institute of State and Law of the Russian Academy of Sciences. The ALU teaching staff is composed of Institute of State and Law fellows and legal academics within the Russian Academy of Sciences. In 2010, the Academic Law University was renamed from the Academic Law University (Russian: Академический правовой университет, АПУ).

== Notable alumni ==
- Sergey Aleksandrovich Volkov, Russian cosmonaut and son of Soviet cosmonaut.
- William E. Butler, LL.M. (1997), Western scholar on Russian law.
