= Konstantin Kavelin =

Russian historian, jurist, and sociologist

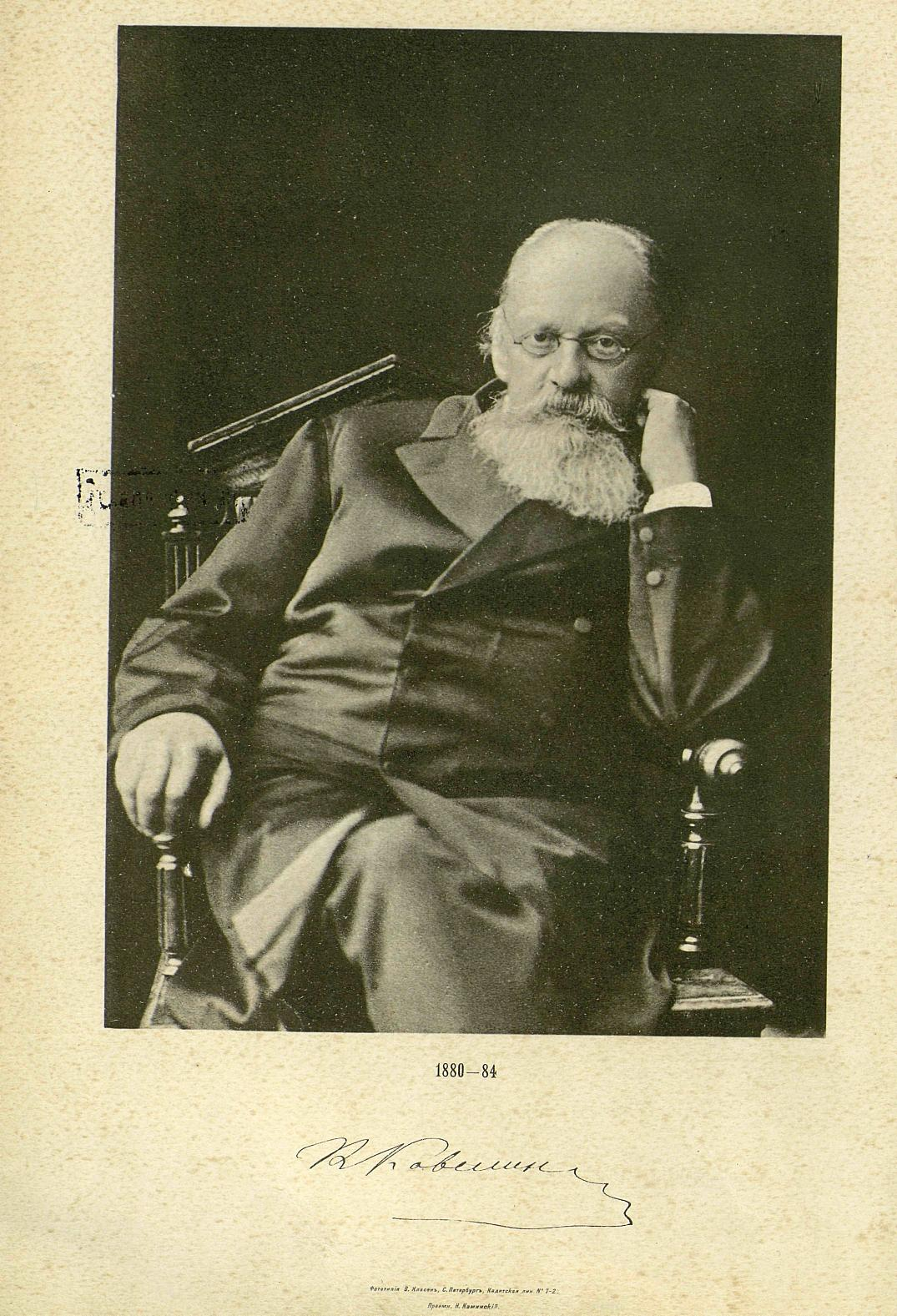
Konstantin D. Kavelin, 1880-1884

Konstantin Dmitrievich Kavelin (Russian: Константи́н Дми́триевич Каве́лин; November 4, 1818 – May 5, 1885) was a Russian historian, jurist, and sociologist, sometimes called the chief architect of early Russian liberalism.

Born in Saint Petersburg into an old noble family, Kavelin graduated from the legal department of the Moscow University and read law at the University of St Petersburg from 1839. Together with Timofey Granovsky and Alexander Herzen, he was one of the leading Westernizers. In 1855, Herzen published Kavelin's celebrated proposal for the emancipation of serfs, which cost him the lucrative position of tsesarevich's tutor. In 1862, he was forced to resign from his post for becoming politically-involved with the student, constitutional movement. During the 1860s, Kavelin was elected President of the Free Economic Society. In his Short Review of Russian History (1887) he seconded many Slavophile opinions and praised the state as the key institution of national history.

Some scholars believe that Kavelin was a prototype of Stiva Oblonski in Leo Tolstoy's novel Anna Karenina.

== See also ==
- List of Russian legal historians
- Russian legal history
