= Tunkin =

Tunkin may refer to:

== People ==
- Grigory Tunkin (1906–1993), Soviet jurist
- Maringka Tunkin (born 1959), Pitjantjatjara artist
- Scott Tunkin (born 1974), Australian baseball player

== Other uses ==
- Tunkin Depression, volcanic field in Russia
