= Mikhail Taube =

Russian lawyer and historian (1869–1961)

Mikhail Alexandrovich Taube
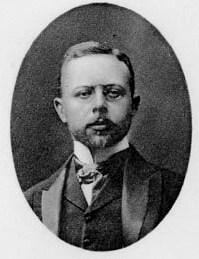
- Born: May 15, 1869; Pavlovsk, Russian Empire
- Died: November 29, 1961 (aged 92); Paris, France
- Occupations: International lawyer, statesman, legal historian
- Notable work: History of the Birth of Contemporary International Law, Christianity and the Organization of International Peace, The System of International Law

Baron Mikhail Alexandrovich Taube (May 15, 1869, Pavlovsk, Russian Empire – November 29, 1961; Paris, France) was a Russian international lawyer, statesman and legal historian. Being a Catholic converted from Russian Orthodoxy, Taube came from an old Swedish-German family von Taube, known from the 13th century, one of the branches of Baltic Germans in the service of the Russian throne.

== Family ==
Taube's father was Alexander Ferdinandovich, a graduate of the Petersburg State Transport University and his mother was Anna (born Butorova). His brother, Alexander: a Lieutenant-General of the Russian Imperial Army, who after the revolution in Russia, being popular among soldier, was elected to represent them in local government. In 1917, Bolsheviks came to power in St. Petersburg and Moscow, eventually the central authorities have extended their power to Siberia where Alexander Taube was located. In 1919, Soviet Red forces were defeated by the White Volunteer Army. General Alexander Taube was imprisoned and under investigation when he died of typhus in the Ekaterinburg prison. The other brothers: Colonel Jacob was murdered during Bolshevik uprising in St. Petersburg,1918; Colonel Boris served in Volunteer ("White") Army under general Miller, emigrated and lived in France; State Counsellor Sergei, a railway engineer, remained in the Soviet Union and was recognized as a distinguished engineer. Baron Michael Taube married in 1897, spouse Raisa Vladimirovna Rogal-Katchura, from whom he had three daughters and a son. His immediate family have initially emigrated to Sweden later lived in France.

== Education ==
Graduated from St. Petersburg High School (1887, gold medal) and St. Petersburg University, Law Faculty, 1891, thesis: "The reception of Roman law in the West". Continued his work at the university starting December 1, 1891, to prepare for a professorship, Department of International Law. Taube was a pupil of the famous international lawyer, Professor Friedrich Martens.

== Legal scholarship ==
On May 28, 1896, he received degree of Master of International Law ("The history of modern international law. (Middle Ages). T. I. Introduction and part of the total. SPb., 1894") and November 29, 1899 received degree of Doctor in International Law ("The history of modern international law". (Middle Ages). T.II. part: Principles of Peace and Law in International Conflicts of the Middle Ages. Kharkov, 1899"). From January 1, 1897, he taught at the University of Kharkov, from 1903 to 1911 at University of St. Petersburg (replaced his teacher at the Department Friedrich Martens), from 1909 to 1917 at Imperial School of Jurisprudence. Taube was also a founding member of the Russian Society of Maritime Law (1905).

== Diplomat ==
From January 2, 1892 until 1917, he was attached to the Russian Imperial Ministry of Foreign Affairs. Taube was Deputy Director of the Second Department of the MFA (from 1905), then Adviser (from 1907) and permanent member of the Council of the Ministry. From 1904 to 1905 he was Russian legal representative at the Paris international commission of inquiry regarding the Dogger Bank incident, where he, along with Admiral Fyodor Dubasov, was instrumental in the successful defense of Russian interests in this complex case. From 1908 to 1909 he represented Russia at a conference on maritime law in London. On November 18, 1909 Taube was Russia's representative to the Permanent Court of Arbitration in The Hague. He worked on numerous explanations, helped prepare and provide advice on international law. In 1914, a few weeks before the start of the First World War, persuaded the Russian government to withdraw from the German banks. This included withdrawal of Russian gold from Germany to Russia.

== Statesman ==
On April 22, 1911, he was Deputy Minister of Education of the Russian Empire. Taube was a close associate of the minister Lev Kasso and supported conservative political views. During Kasso illness, for about a year he acted as Minister of Education. After the death of Casso, from October 19, 1914 to January 11, 1915, he served as Minister of Education of Russia. On many occasions he spoke in the State Duma (Russian Empire), for example on the allocation of the Kingdom of Poland in the Chelm province in 1912, as well as other topics. He participated in drafting the law on the universal primary education in the Russian Empire.

On February 11, 1915, he was appointed a senator, privy councilor. On January 1, 1917, Taube became a member of the State Council (Russian Empire), a member of the Right wing of the Council.

== Catholicism ==
He served as a member of the Imperial Russian Historical Society (1912), the Imperial Society of Zealots in the historical education sector (1914), an honorary member of the Moscow Archaeological Institute (1912), Vitebsk (1909), Tula (1913) and Pskov (1916) Provincial Scientific Archive Commission and Pskov Archeological Society (1916).

Professionally engaged in genealogy, Taube was the author of studies on the history of labor. He also published several books, one of them: Ikskul family genealogy. He was one of the main developers of the Charter of the Russian Genealogical Society ( 1897 a founding member). On March 15, 1914, he was elected vice-chairman of the Society. On May 14, 1905 Taube became member of Historic Genealogical Society in Moscow.

Author of scientific papers on the origin of the Russian state and the baptism of Rus, Russia and the relationship with Catholic Church.

== Cultural activities ==
Mikhail Taube was a member of the Saint Petersburg Philosophical Society (1906), an honorary member of the Society of Classical Philology and Pedagogy in Saint Petersburg (1913). In exile, he published a collection of poems "The visions and thoughts." Taube was also a memoirist and actively preparing to sign the International Covenant on Cultural and historical values (Roerich Pact and Banner of Peace) in the late 1920s early 1930s in Europe and the United States, which was signed in the United States on April 15, 1935, and based in The Hague. Convention of 1954, signed by the participants focused on the protection of cultural property during armed conflict.

== Emigration ==
After the Russian revolution, since 1917 Taube lived in exile, and was a member of the Special Committee for Russia in Finland (1918). While in Finland, he became Minister of Foreign Affairs within a government in exile under the leadership of Alexander Trepov (1918). Then lived in Sweden (he lectured on the history of international relations and international law at Uppsala University), and Germany. From 1928 he lived in Paris, where he taught at a branch of the Russian Institute at the Faculty of Law, University of Paris and the European Center of the Carnegie Endowment for International Peace. He was a member of the Scientific Council of Russian Scientific Institute in Berlin, and has lectured at various universities in Germany and Belgium. Taube continued his study of international law, being a member of the Academy of International Law in The Hague. From 1932 to 1937 he was a Professor of the University of Münster (Germany).

Member of the Supreme Council and the Monarchist Society "Icon" in Paris. In the 1930s, Taube was a legal adviser to the Grand Duke Cyril Vladimirovich, Grand Duke of Russia. He participated in the development of a new charter of the imperial family in the version which followed the Grand Duke Cyril Vladimirovich, Grand Duke of Russia and Grand Duke Vladimir Kirillovich of Russia.

On December 1, 1951, Taube took part in the Central Commission for genealogy establishing measures and legal documentation, court estate arbitration, general registration of noble families, the Russian edition of the lists of titled and untitled nobility, focusing on the history and genealogy of the Baltic and Russian nobility. Taube was also a member of the Russian Historical Genealogical Society in America.

== Catholicism ==
Mikhail von Taube was a parishioner of the Russian Greek Catholic church of the Holy Trinity in Paris and a member of the Russian apostolate, publishing his works in the bulletin " Our parish."

== Facts ==
Michael Taube was an official reviewer for dissertations of Andrey Mandelstam.

== Contributions ==
- History of the Birth of Contemporary International Law, Vol. 1 (St. Petersburg, 1894); Vol. 2 (Kharkov, 1899) (История зарождения современного международного права. том I, СПб., 1894; том II, Харьков, 1899.)
- Christianity and the Organization of International Peace, 2nd ed., Moscow, 1905 (Христианство и организация международного мира. 2-е изд., М., 1905.)
- The System of International Law, St. Petersburg, 1909 (Система междугосударственного права. СПб, 1909.)
- Восточный вопрос и австро-русская политика в первой половине XIX столетия. Пг., 1916. (The Eastern Question and Austrian-Russian Politics in the First Half of the 19th Century, Prague, 1916)
- Вечный мир или вечная война? (Мысли о Лиге наций). Берлин, 1922. (Perpetual Peace or Perpetual War: Thoughts on the League of Nations, Berlin, 1922)
- Этюды об историческом развитии международного права в Восточной Европе. 1926 (на французском языке). (Episodes from Historical Development of International Law in Eastern Europe, 1926 (in French)
- Аграфа: О незаписанных в Евангелии изречениях Иисуса Христа. Варшава, 1936. – 150 с. (также: М.: Крутицкое Патриаршее Подворье, 2007).
- Аграфа у Отцов Церкви. Варшава, 1937.
- Аграфа в древнехристианских апокрифах. Париж, 1947.
- Аграфа в иудейских и магометанских писаниях. Париж, 1951.
- Император Павел I – великий магистр Мальтийского ордена. Париж, 1955 (на французском языке).
- «Зарницы»: воспоминания о трагической судьбе предреволюционной России (1900–1917). М., 2006.
- Michael v. Taube, "Der Grossen Katastrophe Entgegen", verlag von K.F.Koehlers, Leipzig,1937

== See also ==
- Russian legal history
- List of Russian legal historians
