= Semyon Desnitsky =

Russian legal scholar

- Born: c. 1740; Nezhin
- Died: 26 June 1789; Moscow
- Education: Imperial Moscow University (1760); University of Glasgow
- Scientific career
- Workplaces: Imperial Moscow University

Semyon Efimovich Desnitsky (Russian: Семён Ефимович Десницкий; c. 1740 in Nezhin, Russian Empire – 26 June 1789 in Moscow, Russian Empire) was a Russian legal scholar. He was known as a disciple of Adam Smith and introduced his ideas to the Russian public. He was also the first academic to deliver his lectures in Russian language rather than in Latin.

== Biography ==
Desnitsky was born in Nezhin, Russian Empire (present-day Ukraine). He was the second son of a meschanin, a member of the petty bourgeoisie. After a brief spell in the Trinity Lavra seminary, he attended Moscow University, starting in 1759. He went to continue, together with Ivan Andreyevich Tretyakov, his education at the University of Glasgow, where they studied with Adam Smith. In 1767, upon receiving a doctor of laws degree (LLD), he returned to Russia and was appointed professor of law at Moscow University.

Desnitsky was the first Russian professor to question the authority of Samuel von Pufendorf on legal matters and the first to introduce the doctrines of Adam Smith and David Hume to Russian students. He also translated the works of Sir William Blackstone (Commentaries of the laws of England) and advocated equality of the sexes in family law.

Desnitsky pioneered the comparative approach to the study of law and regarded property as a cornerstone of every legal system. There was a great outcry over his rejection of Latin as the sole language of instruction; but Catherine II of Russia personally settled the issue in his favour.

== See also ==
- List of Russian legal historians
