= Dmitri Kachenovsky =

Russian jurist

Dmitri Kachenovsky (undated)

Dmitri Ivanovich Kachenovsky (Russian: Дмитрий Иванович Каченовский; 1 January 1827 – 21 December 1872) was a Russian jurist.

He taught law at the Imperial Kharkov University, where he influenced Maksim Kovalevsky and other liberal political figures. He is known for being one of the first international lawyers to call for the codification of international law, leading to the Paris Declaration of 1856.

== See also ==
- List of Russian legal historians
