= Gennady Danilenko =

Russian law professor (1955–2001)

Gennady Mikhailovich Danilenko (Russian: Геннадий Михайлович Даниленко; 1955 – 18 April 2001) was a Russian law professor and author.

== Early life and education ==
Danilenko was born in 1955 in Krasnodar Krai in the Soviet Union. The middle of three children, he spent his early life in the town of Bataysk, where his father worked as a bricklayer. He studied law at Southern Federal University, graduating in 1977 with honors. Following college, he went back to Bataysk and worked as an attorney for two years. In 1979, he attended the Institute of State and Law. He graduated with an advanced law degree in 1982 and took a position as a researcher there until 1992.

== Career and personal life ==
While working as a researcher, he met and married Olga V. Zaitseva, a fellow lawyer. In 1985, the two had their only child, Elena. In 1994, Danilenko received the Honoured Lawyer of Russia award from Russian president Boris Yeltsin. He was a member of the Executive Committee of the Russian Association of International Law and of the editorial board of the Russian Yearbook of International Law. He was also a senior research fellow for the Russian Academy of Sciences.

Danilenko was a writer, authoring and co-authoring several books on international law, international maritime law, and space law. His first book, Custom in International Law, was published in Moscow in 1988. In 1990, he wrote Perestroika and international law. In 1993, he wrote Law-Making in the International Community, which was reviewed in the American Journal of International Law. It was followed in 1995 by Beyond Concentration. In 1999, he wrote his last book, Law and Legal System of the Russian Federation, published by Oxford University Press. It was favorably reviewed in The American Journal of Comparative Law and the Review of Central and East European Law.

When he moved to the United States, he was a member of the American Society of International Law and the International Law Association. In 1997, he joined Wayne State University as a law professor, a post he held until his death. He taught as an adjunct at the University of Michigan and was also a consultant. A week before his death, his wife began divorce proceedings against him, citing "a breakdown in the marriage relationship".

== Death ==
During Easter 2001, while staying in Amsterdam, Danilenko swallowed at least a dozen balloons of cocaine and entered a plane to Detroit. During his flight, one of the balloons ruptured in his stomach while another was lodged in his esophagus. Fearing he had a heart attack, the plane was diverted to Goose Bay, Newfoundland and Labrador, where he was to receive emergency surgery. While performing surgery, the surgeons found twelve balloons filled with cocaine, six of which burst in his stomach. He fell into a coma and died on April 18.

== Books ==
- —; Movchan, A.P. (1988). Обычай в современном международном праве [Custom in Modern International Law] (in Russian). Nauka. ISBN 5020128570.
- Carty, Anthony; —, eds. (1990). Perestroika and international law: current Anglo-Soviet approaches to international law. Edinburgh University Press. ISBN 9780748601578.
- — (1993). Law-Making in the International Community. Martinus Nijhoff Publishers. ISBN 9781578232543.
- Damrosch, Lori Fisler; —; Mullerson, R. A., eds. (1995). Beyond Confrontation: International Law For The Post-cold War Era. Avalon Publishing. ISBN 9780813389233.
- Burnham, William; —; Maggs, Peter B., eds. (2004). Law and Legal System of the Russian Federation (3rd ed.). Juris Publishing. ISBN 9781578231973.
