= Commodity form theory =

Commodity form theory is a theory of jurisprudence advanced by the Soviet legal theorist Evgeny Pashukanis. The theory argues that the legal form is the parallel of the commodity form under capitalist society.

All law is concerned with the process of the exchanging of commodities between subjects who act as the "guardians" of commodities and are created by law in order to enable the commodity production form of society to function. The theory can be explained as based on two premises, logical and historical.

== The logical premise ==
"Every legal relation" proclaims Pashukanis, "is a relation between subjects". Pashukanis' conceptual account of law begins with the idea of a responsible agent - what he calls "the legal subject".

Property, says Pashukanis, is the basis of the legal form, but only capitalist property that can be disposed of in the market. The subject in law is the expression of the freedom of property, that is, the freedom to alienate property.

Thus the key to understanding law is the contradiction between commodities and subjects.

Commodities according to Karl Marx relate to each other as values, that is exchange takes place on the basis of equivalent amounts of labour-time embodied in commodities passing between buyers and sellers, indicating that there are social relations among things and material relations among people.

Contract is both logically the central legal premise on which all other aspects of law are based, and also the highest form of expression of the commodity owning subject. This is because it is the relations of contract that are crucial for commodity production society since the contract is the necessary legal expression of commodity owners' ability to use their commodities in the market. For Pashukanis, all other forms of legal relations in capitalism flow from this.

== The historical premise ==
The commodity form of exchange historically precedes the legal system which emerges from it. But it is not merely that the commodity form produces the legal form; it is that the commodity form exists prior to the legal form and that only with the full development of the commodity form is there the possibility of a fully developed abstract legal form at all.

== Fetishism ==
Commodity form theory is related to Marx's theory of commodity fetishism. Marx argued that the commodity was a fetishized form because the formal equality that the commodity form postulated was only an apparent equality. The legal form is blind to substantive human differences, just as the commodity form is blind to substantive differences in use value. Ultimately, the legal form, just as the commodity form, exists independently of the will of the individual. The illusion is produced that the law – as the universal political equivalent – has a life of its own.
