= Ivan Kornilov =

Soviet general

Ivan Alekseyevich Kornilov (1899–1953) was a Soviet general.

Kornilov rose through the ranks of the Red Army in the 1930s and was promoted to the rank of major-general in June 1940, commanding the 45th Rifle Division. He was in command of the 49th Rifle Corps during the early phases of Operation Barbarossa in 1941, but was badly wounded and had to give up his command. Shortly thereafter he was captured by the German Army and spent the rest of World War II as a prisoner of war.

He was detained by Soviet security services for the routine security checks as part of the filtration process administered to ensure that the newly liberated captured Soviet soldiers had not collaborated with their Nazi captors during captivity, but cleared and allowed to resume his military career in the same year. He served as head of the military departments at the Kuybyshev Planning Institute (1947–1950) and Rostov State University (1950–1953).

== Notes ==
- See Kornilov's entry at Generals.dk
