= Southern Federal University =

Public university in Rostov Oblast, Russia

- Южный федеральный университет
- Type: Public
- Established: 1915
- Rector: Inna Shevchenko
- Faculty: 4,227
- Students: 44,889
- Location: Rostov-on-Don, Russia; Taganrog, Russia; 47.2247°N 39.7286°E
- Campus: Urban
- Website: www.sfedu.ru Building details
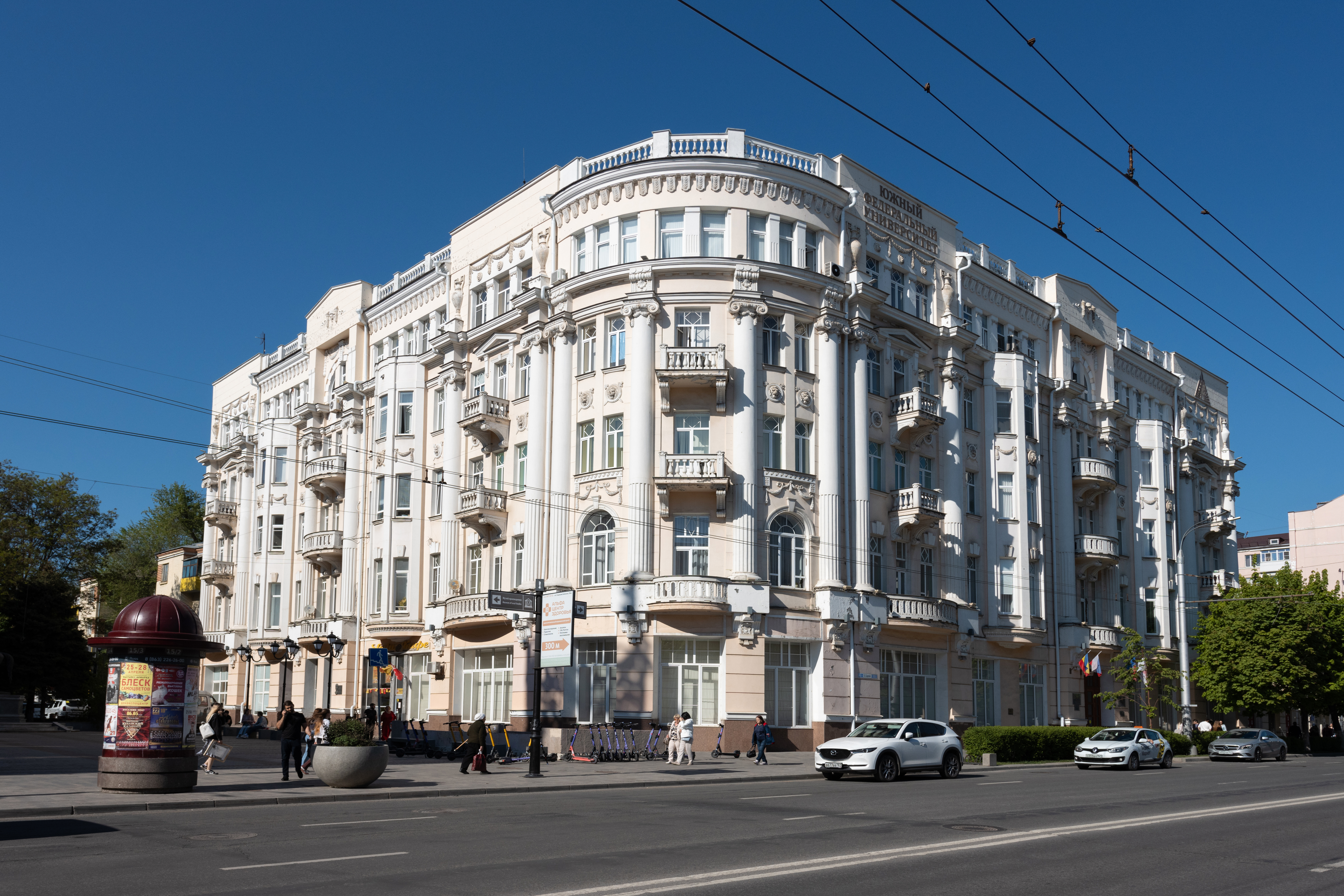

University rankings

Global – Overall
- USNWR Global: 1,647 (2023)

Regional – Overall
- QS Emerging Europe and Central Asia: 90 (2022)

Southern Federal University (Russian: Южный федеральный университет), abbreviated as SFedU (Russian: ЮФУ) and formerly known as Rostov State University (1957–2006), is a public university in Rostov Oblast, Russia with campuses in Rostov-on-Don and Taganrog. In 2023 US News & World Report ranked it # 1,647 in the world.

== History ==
Southern Federal University is the largest research and educational establishment of Rostov Oblast. The university began to operate in Rostov-on-Don in 1915 as an affiliate part of Imperial University of Warsaw whose Russian staff had been evacuated from Poland with the onset of World War I. Later, with the collapse of Russian Empire, the university was named Donskoy University after the region of Don by the decree of Russian Provisional Government on May 5, 1917. When founded in 1915, Donskoy University was the first higher education institution in Rostov-on-Don and had four academic departments: history & philosophy, medicine, physics & mathematics, and law. In 1917–1920, during Russian Civil War, Rostov-on-Don was under the control of the anti-Soviet coalition forces of Russian White movement including Kaledin's Don Army. Many of the staff who found refuge at Donskoy University at that time had a strong anti-Soviet stance and students were being drafted to White Army. During the turmoil years of the Civil War the official name of the university was Bogaevsky Donskoy University named after Mitrofan Bogaevsky, assistant to Ataman Alexey Kaledin. Following the takeover of Rostov-on-Don by Red Army in January 1920, the authority over Donskoy University passed to the Soviet government. That same year the Soviets purged the university off any seemed disloyal and pro-White movement staff members.

Marina Alexandrovna Borovskaya, president of the university, was suspended by the European University Association (EUA) following support for the 2022 Russian invasion of Ukraine by the Russian Union of Rectors (RUR) in March 2022, for being "diametrically opposed to the European values that they committed to when joining EUA”.

== Academics ==
=== University centers and degree-granting institutions ===
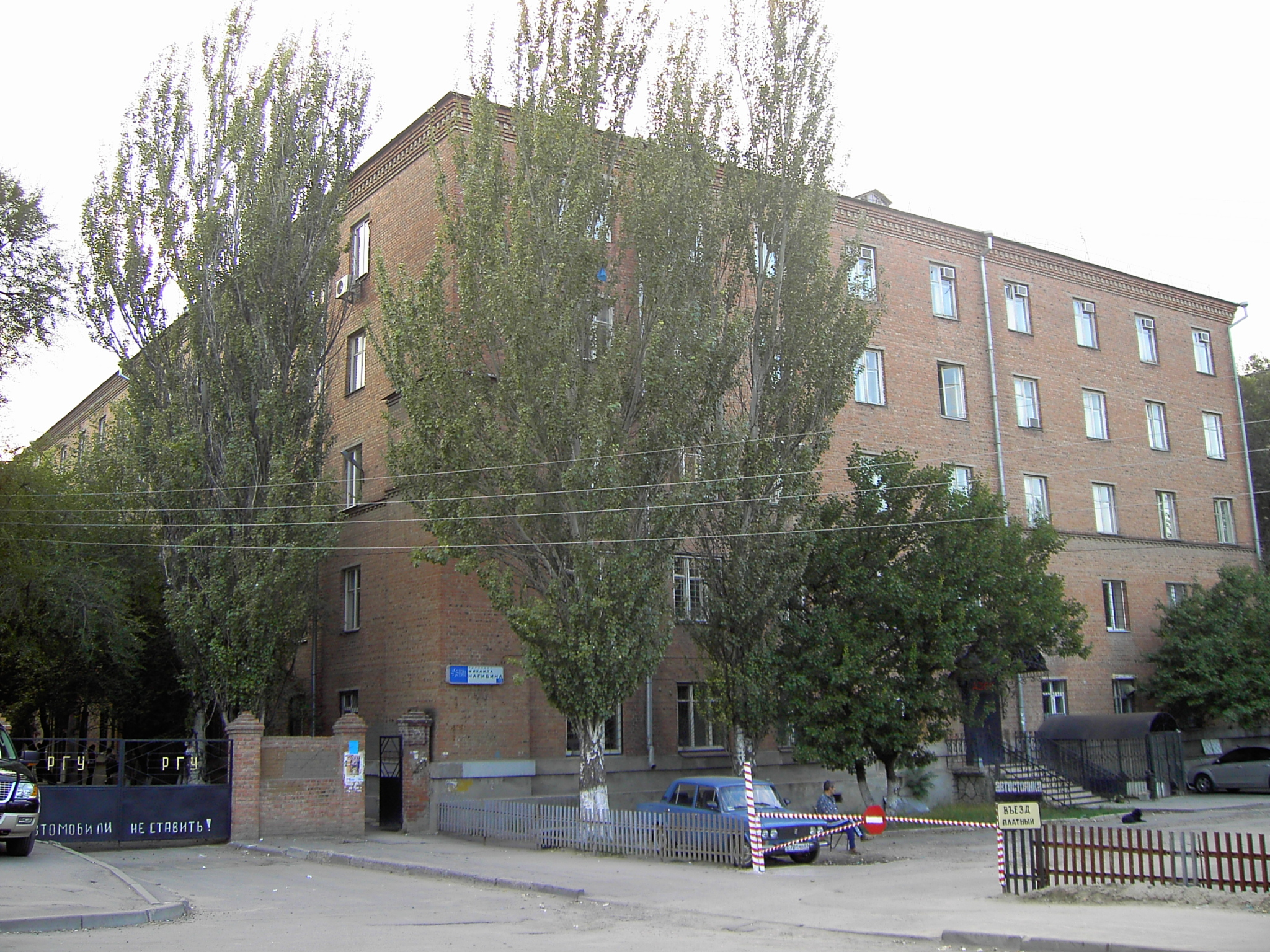
Building housing the Faculty of Philosophy & Cultural Studies at Rostov-on-Don campus

- Main campus of SFedU (former Rostov State University)
- Institute of Economics and International Relations

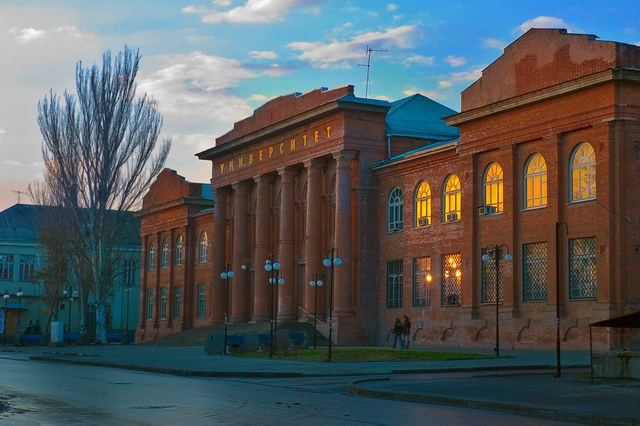
Hall "A" at Taganrog campus

- Pedagogical Institute (former Rostov State Pedagogical University)
- Taganrog Institute of Technology (abbreviated as TIT, former Taganrog State University of Radioengineering)
- Institute of Architecture & Arts (former Rostov State Academy of Architecture & Arts)
- The Smart Materials Research Center

== Rankings ==
University rankings

Global – Overall
- QS World: 1,647
- THE World: 801-1000

In 2023 US News & World Report ranked it # 1,647 in the world. In 2017, Times Higher Education ranked the university within the 801-1000 band globally.

== Degree mill ==
The volunteer community network Dissernet has discovered multiple cases of PhD level degrees being awarded by the university for heavily plagiarized theses.

== Notable people ==
=== Alumni ===
- Alexander Ankvab, President of Abkhazia
- Ekaterina Nikitichna Blinova, meteorologist
- Alexander Bovin, journalist, political scientist and diplomat
- Aleksander Burba, chemist, founder of metallurgy of germanium
- Alexander Fedorov, media educator, film critic, editor of Media Education Journal
- Zinaida Ermol’eva, microbiologist and biochemist who developed first Soviet-made antibiotics, recipient of numerous Soviet awards
- Sergey Shakhray, deputy Prime Minister of Russia
- Aleksandr Solzhenitsyn, writer Nobel prize winner
- Valery Tarsis, writer.
- Tony Vilgotsky, writer
- Gennady Danilenko, law professor and author

=== Faculty ===
- Dmitry Morduhai-Boltovskoi, mathematician
- Dmitri Ivanovsky, botanist, founder of virology
- Iosif Vorovich, mathematician
- Ivan Alekseyevich Kornilov, Soviet general
- Sabina Spielrein, psychoanalyst
- Vladimir Semyonovich Semyonov, Soviet diplomat
- Yuri Zhdanov, chemist, rector of the University of Rostov (1957—1988)

== See also ==
- List of modern universities in Europe (1801–1945)
