= William E. Butler =

American jurist

William Elliott Butler
- Born: 20 October 1939 (age 86)

Academic background
- Academic advisors: John N. Hazard; Harold J. Berman

Academic work
- Discipline: Russian law
- Institutions: University of London; School of Advanced International Studies

William Elliott Butler (born 20 October 1939) is a jurist and academic known for his work on the legal systems of Russia, the Commonwealth of Independent States (CIS), and Mongolia, as well as his contributions to public and private international law. He has held academic positions including John Edward Fowler Distinguished Professor of Law at the Dickinson School of Law, Pennsylvania State University (since 2005); professorial research associate at the School of Oriental and African Studies, University of London (2006-2008); and emeritus professor of comparative law at the University of London (since 2005). Butler has published several books on Russian law. He is a bibliophile and bookplate collector.

== Education ==
Butler received his education in the United States. In the early 1960s, he attended lectures on Soviet law by John N. Hazard at the Johns Hopkins University School of Advanced International Studies (SAIS) and later worked with Harold J. Berman at Harvard Law School, both of whom were leading figures in the development of Soviet legal studies in the West. These experiences contributed to his interest in Soviet law, as well as in international and comparative legal studies.

His academic qualifications include: an Associate of Arts degree from Hibbing Junior College (1959); a Bachelor of Arts from The American University, School of International Service (1961); a Master of Arts from the Johns Hopkins SAIS (1963); a Juris Doctor from Harvard Law School (1966); a Master of Laws from the Academy University of Law, Institute of State and Law, Russian Academy of Sciences (1997); a Ph.D. from Johns Hopkins SAIS (1970), based on a dissertation titled Soviet Union and the Law of the Sea; and a Doctor of Laws (LL.D.) from the University of London (1979).

== Academic career ==
After serving two years (1966–68) in Washington, D.C., as research assistant at the Washington Center for Foreign Policy Research, Johns Hopkins SAIS, working on a research contract for the United States Arms Control and Disarmament Agency, and a further two years (1968–70) as research associate in law at the Harvard Law School, working in Soviet, Chinese, and Western approaches to international law, in 1970 Butler was elected to the established Readership in Comparative Law at the University of London, tenable at University College London, and elevated to a personal chair in 1976 as Professor of Comparative Law. Till the late 1980s, he pursued principally an academic career, although he acted as a consultant to governments and international organizations.

His early research pursued the interface between Soviet law and the international legal system, a subject which he later broadened to address comparative approaches to international law. The key books of this period included: The Soviet Union and the Law of the Sea (Baltimore, Johns Hopkins Press, 1971); The Merchant Shipping Code of the USSR 1968 (Baltimore, Johns Hopkins Press, 1970) (with J. B. Quigley, Jr.); Northeast Arctic Passage (Leiden, Martinus Nijhoff, 1978); an edition of P. P. Shafirov, Discourse on the Causes of War between Russia and Sweden (Dobbs Ferry, Oceana Publications, 1973); Comparative Approaches to International Law (1978); Documents on Socialist International Organizations (1978); Russian Law: Historical and Political Perspectives (Leiden, A. W. Sijthoff, 1977); The Soviet Legal System (in co-authorship with John N. Hazard and Peter B. Maggs; 3d ed.; Dobbs Ferry: Oceana Publications, 1977; new ed., 1984) and Soviet Law (London: Butterworths, 1983; new ed., 1988).

In 1982 Butler founded the Centre for the Study of Socialist Legal Systems, University College London, which in 1993 was renamed The Vinogradoff Institute and in 2005 was removed to Penn State Dickinson Law. He served as dean of the Faculty of Laws, University College London (1977–79) and of the University of London (1988–90). He has been Visiting Professor of Law at New York University Law School, Harvard Law School, Washington and Lee School of Law, and the Moscow State University. For many years he was a member of the Council of the School of Slavonic and East European Studies, University of London, including one term as Vice-Chairman.

He is the author, co-author, editor, or translator of more than 3,500 books, loose-leaf services, articles, and reviews on Soviet, Russian, Ukrainian, Belarus, Tajik, Uzbek, Kazakh, Baltic, and other CIS legal systems. His articles have been published in the leading law reviews of the United Kingdom, the Russian Federation, and the United States.

In 1985 he delivered a cycle of lectures at the Hague Academy of International Law on "Comparative Approaches to International Law".

During the late years of perestroika in the Soviet Union and then in the post-Soviet period, he took active role in law reform as a recognized expert on many areas of law. Butler's principal treatise is Russian Law (Oxford, Oxford University Press, 1999; 2d ed., 2003; 3d ed., 2009), which gives a comprehensive account of the history, sources and all branches of Russian law, as well as its place within international context. It was cited by the United States Court of Appeals in 2004. Butler maintains that the transition from a planned economy to a market economy is one which no State has previously undertaken in human history, and Russian law is the principal vehicle of this transition. He is of the view that CIS legal systems are currently in search of their legal identity and therefore present a unique laboratory of comparative law approaches.

Among salient titles of recent years which pursue these themes are:

- Russian Foreign Relations and Investment Law (Oxford: Oxford University Press, 2006)
- The Law of Treaties in Russia and Other Member Countries of the Commonwealth of Independent States (Cambridge University Press, 2002)
- Foreign Investment Law in the Commonwealth of Independent States (London, Wildy, Simmonds & Hill, 2002)
- Russian-English Legal Dictionary (Ardsley: Transnational, 2001; 3d ed.; Clark, NJ, Talbot Publishing, 2023)
- The Corporation and Securities Under Russian and American Law (with Maryann E. Gashi-Butler) (Moscow: Zertsalo, 1997).

He has published a number of works in the Russian Federation, including the Russian-English Legal Dictionary (Moscow, Zertsalo, 1995; 2d ed., 2001) and edited editions in the classics of Russian legal history, amongst them a revised edition of V. E. Grabar's History of the literature of international law in Russia, 1647-1917; an edition of Shafirov's Discourse on the law of nations, Kamarovskii's work on an international court, and Catherine II's Nakaz, usually in collaboration with Professor V. A. Tomsinov (Moscow State University). His translation of the Ukrainian Criminal Code was published by the National Academy of Sciences of Ukraine in Kiev (2001). His translations of the Russian Civil Code, Family Code, Tax Code, Land Code, Labor Code, and Criminal Code have appeared in parallel Russian and English texts (Moscow, JurinfoR) in large editions.

In addition to original works he has engaged in the translation of Soviet and post-Soviet legislation. Mostly these appeared in the quarterly journal Soviet Statutes and Decisions (White Plains, New York, Sharpe Publishing) and in looseleaf services published by Oceana Publications and, from 2006 to 2024, by Juris Publishers in New York. In total he has published translations of more than 2,500 normative legal acts adopted in the former Soviet Union, all CIS countries, and Mongolia (a full bibliography is contained International and Comparative Law: А Bibliography, London: Wildy, Simmonds & Hill, 2005). As a result, the largest body of English translations of post-Soviet legislation has been created of academic quality. Although Butler is not the only scholar who has contributed to the translation of Russian legal texts, it is mainly due to his efforts that the Western law student or lawyer has now more available to him in English translation concerning the Russian legal system than for any continental European jurisdiction.

He founded the quarterly journal Sudebnik (1995–2007) and serves on the editorial boards of the principal English-language journals, law reviews, and yearbooks devoted to Russia and other CIS legal systems. Commencing in 2004, he became the founding editor of Russian Law: Theory and Practice, issued by the Russian Academy of Legal Sciences (2004–2009) and consulting and book review editor, elevated from 2008 to co-editor (with Professor Michael Palmer) of The Journal of Comparative Law (London, Wildy, Simmonds & Hill, 2005-2025).

From 2003 to 2018 he served as a trustee of the Hakluyt Society and has served as a member of the Committee for Central and Inner Asia attached to The British Academy since its inception and as a member of The Bentham Committee since 2003. He has been appointed editor of Bentham's works on international law.

== Helping law reform in CIS countries ==
Commencing with Mikhail Gorbachev's perestroika and onwards, Butler became more deeply involved in consulting activities, providing expertise for the legal reforms in the USSR and its successor states. In 1989 he was appointed Special Counsel and Chairman of a Working Group attached to the Commission for Economic Reform of the USSR Council of Ministers. In this capacity, he evaluated key draft perestroika legislation and was co-author of the Draft USSR Law on Pledge which, in May 1992, was the basis for legislation enacted by the Russian Parliament and then for similar laws adopted in Belarus, Kazakhstan, Kyrgyzstan, Turkmenistan, Ukraine, and Uzbekistan. The same Working Group prepared the Edict of the President of the Russian Federation on Trust Ownership, adopted on 24 December 1993 and still in force. From July 1992 to February 1993, he was seconded as Senior Legal Counsel to the Russian Federation State Committee for the Administration of State Property, where he headed a small team of legal specialists to prepare draft Russian laws on trust ownership, securities, and investment funds, joint-stock societies, full partnerships, Kommandit partnerships, and limited responsibility partnerships.

He served as a member of the European Union Joint Task Force on Law Reform in the Independent States together with leading Russian, European, and CIS jurists and was a co-author of the Report produced by this Task Force. In October–November 2002 he acted as a consultant to a health project in Russia for the Department for International Development of the Government of the United Kingdom, and in Spring 2003 completed a substantial report for the International Family Health Foundation on the legal regime of harm reduction programs in Russia. In 2003 he completed a major study for the Department for International Development, published separately in the English and Russian languages as: HIV/AIDS and Drug Misuse in Russia: Harm Reduction Programmes and the Russian Legal System (London, DFID/IFH, 2003). Pursuing the same subject, in 2009 the United Nations Office on Drugs and Crime in Moscow published his study on the legal aspects of substitution therapy in Russia.

He has advised governmental bodies and international organizations on various aspects of law reforms in the CIS countries. Among them were the World Bank, the Office of the Legal Adviser, United States Department of State, the United States Department of Justice, the Department of Health and Social Security of the United Kingdom, the Department for International Development (DFID) of the United Kingdom, the United Nations Office on Drugs and Crime, the authorities of Lithuania, Kyrgyzstan, Belarus, Azerbaijan, Uzbekistan, Tajikistan, as well as banks, large corporations, and industry associations.

In addition, he has advised on and given formal legal opinions on all aspects of Russian and Soviet Law before English and American courts, tribunals, and arbitral tribunals. In particular, in February 2005 he appeared as a legal expert before the US Bankruptcy Court for the Southern District of Texas in Houston within the litigation between Russian oil giant Yukos, on the one hand, and Deutsche Bank and Gazpromneft, on the other. In his statement before the court Butler said that there was no treaty between the US and Russia on the mutual recognition of legal rulings. That essentially meant Russian authorities were under no obligation to comply with any US rulings in the Yukos case.

In May 1995 he was elected to a five-year term as a member of the Russian International Court of Commercial Arbitration, and re-elected for further terms in 2000 and 2005. He has acted in more than twenty Moscow arbitrations, including as Chairman of the tribunal. He also has acted in the London and Stockholm courts of international arbitration as an arbitrator and has conducted arbitrations ad hoc. In 2008 he was appointed to the Panels of Distinguished Neutrals, both International and Pennsylvania, as an arbitrator by the CPR International Institute for Conflict Prevention and Resolution.

In 1993 he founded the Faculty of Law of the unique Russian-British postgraduate university – the Moscow Higher School of Social and Economic Sciences attached to the Academy of National Economy of the Russian Federation. He served as the founding Dean (1993–98) and M. M. Speransky Professor of International and Comparative Law (until 2004) of that faculty.

== Legal practice ==
He has acted as Of Counsel to Cole Corette & Abrutyn (1988–92) and Clifford Chance (1992–94) and as Partner and head of the CIS London Group and the Almaty and Tashkent offices of White & Case (1994–96). From 1997-2001 he was a co-founder and Senior Partner in the PwC (later Landwell) CIS International Law Firm in Moscow, and in 2002 co-founded Phoenix Law Associates CIS, a Russian law firm located in Moscow, active until 2006.

He is admitted to the Bar of the District of Columbia (1967) and the Bar of the Supreme Court of the United States (1970), and has been licensed by the respective Ministry of Justice in Uzbekistan (1996) and the Russian Federation (1997) as a jurisconsult.

== Recognition and awards ==
Member of:

- The International Union of Jurists in Moscow (1991-; Executive Committee, 1994- )
- The Russian Academy of Natural Sciences (1992- )
- The National Academy of Sciences of Ukraine (1992- )
- The National Academy of Legal Sciences of Ukraine (2013-)
- Honorary Member of the Kazakhstan Association of Business Lawyers (1995- )
- The Senior Common Room of St Antony's College, Oxford University (2004-2008)
- The Union of Russian Jurists (2004- )
- The American Law Institute (2009- ).

He was awarded a Certificate of Honor by the International Union of Jurists (CIS) in 1996 and 2005 for services to Russian law and in June 2003, the G. I. Tunkin Medal by the Russian International Law Association for services to international law (2003). Other awards include a Certificate of Honor by the Russian Association of Maritime Law (2003), the Ivan Fedorov Medal and Diploma for services to Anglo-Russian cultural relations (2004) and a Certificate of Honor of the Russian Association of International Law (2007).

== Bibliophily and bookplate collecting ==
Butler has gathered a collection of bookplates and written a number of books on this subject, including:

- Modern Soviet Literary Bookplates (1988);
- The Golden Era of American Bookplate Design (1986) and Modern English Bookplates (1990), both in co-authorship with the late Darlene J. Butler;
- American Bookplates (2000), and others.

He was the founding editor of The Bookplate Journal (London, 1983-) and of the journal Bookplate International (1994–2005). He has served as the Executive Secretary of the International Federation of Ex-Libris Societies (FISAE) from 1986 to 2016. He is a member of the Grolier Club (1996-); the Organization of Russian Bibliophiles (1992-), and the Section for the Book and Graphics, St. Petersburg, attached to the Russian Academy of Sciences.

== Beekeeping ==
Butler is an amateur beekeeper who has been featured in Bee Culture Magazine. In addition, Butler occasionally lectures to local beekeeping groups.
