= Vikenty Pashukanis =

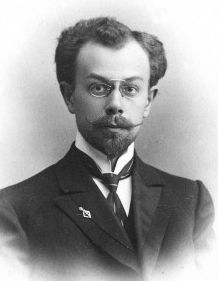
Vikenty Pashukanis

Vikenty Vikentyevich Pashukanis (Russian: Викентий Викентиевич Пашуканис; 1879–1920) was a secretary of the publishing house "Musaget" and a founder of "Pashukanis' Publishing"; after the Russian Revolution (1917) he was an organizer of museums.

Vikenty Pashukanis was born in Moscow, Russia in October 1879. His father was a Lithuanian from Kaunas and worked as a teacher in the gymnasium. Pashukanis graduated from the mathematical department of Moscow University. After graduation, he worked as an exciseman. In 1914, Pashukanis became a secretary and a commercial director of "Musaget" - Moscow publishing house of symbolists. After the beginning of World War I Emil Medtner, who was one of the founders and the main owner of "Musaget", could not return from Zurich to Russia. In that time Pashukanis actually controlled the financial activity of "Musaget". In 1915-1917, he negotiated with Alexander Blok, over a series of fourteen letters, the publication of his poems which improved for some time precarious financial situation of "Musaget".

In 1915, Pashukanis proposed a re-organization of "Musaget" to make it more profitable; however, E. Medtner declined his proposal. Then, keeping his work in "Musaget", Pashukanis started his own company: "Pashukanis' Publishing". He mainly published the famous contemporary Russian poets: Igor Severyanin (who was the most popular Russian poet in the 1910s), Konstantin Bal'mont, Andrey Bely, and Victor Gofman. Books produced by "Pashukanis' Publishing" were elegant and of high print quality.

After the Russian revolution in 1918, Pashukanis was employed as an emissary of the Museum department of People's Commissariat (ministry) of Education. He was responsible for assessing and evacuating the art treasures from the estates abandoned by nobles to Moscow. Russia was involved in a civil war and Pashukanis often had to act in the rebellious regions. Among others, he saved from pillage the collections of Count Radziwill from their estate near Bobruisk and the unique collection of Ivan Paskevich from the Gomel Palace.

In December 1919, Pashukanis was arrested in Moscow. He was indicted for organizing a meeting of the counter-revolutionary group. On December 16, 1919, the head of Museum department, Natalia Sedova (wife of Leon Trotsky), sent a telegram attempting to save him. On January 13, 1920, he was sentenced to be shot; however, there is no official record that the sentence was carried out.

In 2005, the Belarusian TV and radio company "Gomel" filmed a 26-minute documentary The tragedy of Vikenty Pashukanis.

The cousin of Vikenty Pashukanis, Evgeny Pashukanis (1891–1937), was a famous theorist of Marxist law and a deputy of the People's Commissariate of Justice of the USSR.
