= Evgeny Pashukanis =

Soviet legal scholar (1891–1937)

- Евгений Пашуканис; Eugenijus Pašukanis
- Born: Evgeny Bronislavovich Pashukanis; 23 February 1891; Staritsa, Russian Empire
- Died: 4 September 1937 (aged 46); Moscow, Russian SFSR, Soviet Union
- Education: Saint Petersburg State University
- Occupations: Jurist; politician; philosopher; lawyer
- Employer: Moscow State University
- Notable work: The General Theory of Law and Marxism
- Political party: RSDLP (1908–1918); CPSU (1918–1937)

Evgeny Bronislavovich Pashukanis (Russian: Евгений Брониславович Пашуканис; Lithuanian: Eugenijus Pašukanis; 23 February [O.S. 11 February] 1891 – 4 September 1937) was a Soviet and Lithuanian legal scholar, best known for his work The General Theory of Law and Marxism. He advocated for a philosophy of law that the Soviet authorities considered threatening to their regime. He was executed in 1937 after Stalinists, including Andrey Vyshinsky, accused him of plotting to overthrow the Soviet state.

== Early life and October Revolution ==
Pashukanis was born in Staritsa, in the Tver Governorate in the Russian Empire. The Pashukanis family was of Lithuanian background; he was a cousin of the publisher, Vikentiy Pashukanis. Influenced by his family, particularly his uncle, he joined the Russian Social Democratic Workers' Party (RSLDP) in Saint Petersburg at the age of 17. In 1909, he started studying jurisprudence in Saint Petersburg. As a result of his socialist activism, the Czarist police threatened Pashukanis with banishment, so he left Russia for Germany in 1910. He continued his studies in Munich. During World War I, he returned to his native Russia. In 1914, he helped draft the RSLDP resolution opposing the war. Following the 1917 October Revolution and the establishment of Soviet Russia, Pashukanis joined the Russian Communist Party (b), after its founding in 1918. In August 1918, he became a judge in Moscow. Meanwhile, he launched his career as a legal scholar. He also held a post in the Ministry of Foreign Affairs and was an adviser to the Soviet embassy in Berlin, helping to draft the Rapallo Treaty of 1922. In 1924 he was transferred to full-time academic duties as a member of the Communist Academy.

== The General Theory of Law and Marxism ==
In 1924, Pashukanis published his seminal work, The General Theory of Law and Marxism. This is best known for Pashukanis' formulation of the "Commodity Exchange Theory of Law". This theory was built on two pillars of Marxist thought: (1) in the organization of society the economic factor is paramount; legal and moral principles and institutions therefore constitute a kind of superstructure reflecting the economic organization of society; and (2) in the finally achieved state of communism, law and the state will wither away. If communism is achieved, morality as it is typically understood will cease to perform any function.

«Why does class rule not remain what it is, the factual subjugation of one section of the population by the other? Why does it assume the form of official state rule, or - which is the same thing – why does the machinery of state coercion not come into being as the private machinery of the ruling class; why does it detach itself from the ruling class and take on the form of an impersonal apparatus of public power, separate from society? ... Another of the things with which Comrade Stuchka reproaches me - namely that I recognise the existence of law only in bourgeois society, I grant…» (E. B. Pashukanis, The General Theory of Law and Marxism, 1924).

== Contribution to critique of Kelsenian legal positivism ==
In The General Theory of Law and Marxism Pashukanis criticised the pure theory of law advanced by leading European legal positivist, Hans Kelsen. Kelsen's theory maintained a strict separation between legal norms on one hand, and the social relations regulated by those norms on the other. This included distinguishing between validity and efficacy, with validity being whether a norm is legally valid and efficacy being whether the norm is actually observed. Pashukanis however argued that "the relation has primacy over the norm" because law without efficacy is nonexistent. Thus, according to Pashukanis, if no debtor ever repaid their debts, the rule that debtors have to repay debts "would have to be considered as non-existent in real terms." Furthermore, Pashukanis argued that the theories of the Kelsenian positivists were simply "confined exclusively to ordering the various normative contents in a logically determined manner," and that the pure theory of law "explains nothing, and turns its back from the outset on the facts of reality, that is of social life..."

== Latter years ==
From 1925 to 1927, Pyotr Stuchka, another Soviet legal scholar, and Pashukanis compiled an Encyclopedia of State and Law and started a journal named Revolution of Law. In 1927, he was elected a full member of the Communist Academy, eventually becoming its vice-president in 1930. He and Stuchka started a section on General Theory of State and Law at the Academy. However, in 1930, he was attacked by Stalinists, because he insisted of the impossibility of "proletarian law" or "socialist rights". He was then stripped of all his political posts. Pashukanis soon came under pressure from the government as well. As a result, Pashukanis started to revise his theory of state. He stopped working with his friend Stuchka. It is unclear whether Pashukanis's transformation was simply the result of fear for his safety, or whether he actually changed his mind. He was rewarded by being made director of the Institute of Soviet Construction and Law (predecessor of the Institute of State and Law of the Soviet Academy of Sciences) in 1931. In 1936, he was appointed as Deputy People's Commissar of Justice of the USSR and was proposed for membership in the Soviet Academy of Sciences.

According to Andreas Harms, Pashukanis was denounced as an "enemy of the people" by Pyotr Yudin. Andrey Vyshinsky also accused Pashukanis of being a traitor. On 20 January 1937, Pashukanis was arrested and Andrey Vyshinsky soon replaced him at the Institute of Soviet Construction and Law. Alfred Krishianovich Stalgevich, a longtime critic of Pashukanis, took over his courses at the Moscow Juridical Institute. After publishing many self-criticisms, Pashukanis was eventually denounced as a "Trotskyite saboteur" in 1937 and executed in September 1937 on charges of being involved in an "underground anti-Soviet terrorist organisation". Pashukanis was posthumously rehabilitated in 1957, although his theories were not adopted by mainstream Soviet jurisprudence at that time. He gained relevance in the German State derivation debate in the 1970s.

== See also ==
- List of Russian legal historians
- Yevgeny Korovin, Pashukanis' contemporary at the Institute of State and Law
