= Law of Russia =

The primary and fundamental source of laws in the Russian Federation is the Constitution of the Russian Federation. Statutes, such as the Russian Civil Code and the Russian Criminal Code, are the predominant legal source of Russian law.

== Hierarchy ==
=== Constitutionism ===
Adopted by national referendum on 12 December 1993 with 54.5% of the vote, the Constitution took effect on the day of its publication – 25 December of the same year. It sets out the fundamentals of government and proclaims the rule of law, the ideological neutrality of the state, political pluralism, competitive elections, and the separation of powers, while guaranteeing fundamental human rights to the Russian people. The Constitution establishes a semi‑presidential system that encompasses strong executive power and increased independence for the president. Since its adoption in a 1993 referendum, the Russian Constitution has been considered the supreme law of the land. Article 15 of the Constitution states that it "shall have supreme legal force and have direct effect, and shall be applicable throughout the entire territory of the Russian Federation." Courts are guided by the Constitution, and it overrides federal and local laws.

==== Amendments ====
Few amendments have been made to the Constitution since its adoption. The most significant of these was enacted in 2008, when the presidential term of office was extended from four to six years.

== Presidential system of the Russian Federation ==
Following the dissolution of the Soviet Union, the Russian Federation emerged as an independent state in 1991. It is defined in its constitution, adopted in 1993, as a 'democratic, federal, rule‑based republic', and the constitution enshrines universal principles such as human rights and freedoms, free elections, political and ideological pluralism, and judicial independence. According to the Constitution, the President of Russia is the head of state and operates within a multi‑party system, with executive power exercised by the government, headed by the Prime Minister, who is appointed by the President with the approval of parliament. Legislative power is vested in the two houses of the Federal Assembly, while the President and the government issue numerous legally binding by‑laws. Nonetheless, even some academics who accept that Russia has a constitutional semi‑presidential model describe the system as 'presidential' or even 'super‑presidential' because of the strong and central position occupied by the president.

=== Constitutional laws (federal constitutional laws) ===
A federal constitutional law is a type of federal regulatory legal act adopted in accordance with the Constitution of the Russian Federation on matters stipulated by the Constitution. It has greater legal force than a federal law (federal laws must not contradict federal constitutional laws), but less legal force than a law of the Russian Federation on a constitutional amendment.

=== Statutes ===
Statutes are the predominant legal source of Russian law and may only be enacted through the legislative process. Codes form the basis of law on a given matter and are usually supplemented by legislation to develop specific provisions. Although there are gaps in some codes, judges will find a basis for deciding a case within the relevant code. Codes are interpreted flexibly, and interpretation may be guided by the enumeration of 'general principles' set out in the codes. These general principles are usually articulated at the beginning of the codes, typically in the first chapter, to outline the purpose of the legislation. Reasoning by analogy is also permitted.

The Civil Code of Russia is regarded as the 'constitution' of the market economy and holds a special place in the hierarchy of codes, as it will supersede contradictory provisions in other codes. New codes and laws override older ones, unless a statute expressly preserves the old law.

The Criminal Code of Russia (UGKRF, 63‑ФЗ) is the penal statute, which defines conduct that is impermissible in Russia. The first and current Criminal Code came into force on 1 January 1997. On 8 January 1997, President Yeltsin signed the Criminal Correctional Code to regulate the conditions of sentences. The new Criminal Code replaced the Soviet analogue of 1960. The main changes concern economic crimes and property crimes.

=== Sub-laws ===
==== Presidential decrees and directives ====
The President has the power to issue normative and non‑normative decrees, provided they do not contravene the Constitution or federal laws. The Government may also issue directives of a 'normative' character, on the basis of and for the purpose of implementing the Constitution, federal laws, and normative decrees of the President.

==== Agency regulations ====
Agencies may enact regulations through their general competency, but these are limited by the Constitution and relevant codes. If these limits are not strictly defined, the President may use agencies to circumvent the legislative process. Consequently, agencies may have their powers restricted by statutes. The Civil Code deliberately authorises supplementary rules by 'statute' rather than the broader term 'legislation', which could encompass other forms of secondary law.

=== Judicial decisions, judicial practice and explanations of supreme courts ===
Russia is a civil‑law country and, strictly speaking, decisions rendered by courts are not binding on other courts. However, lower courts generally follow the principles established by the supreme courts. Moreover, under Article 308.8 of the Code of Procedure in Commercial Courts, the Supreme Court may set aside a decision of a lower court on the grounds that it contravenes the uniformity in the interpretation of law as established by case law. In practice, but not in theory, the precedents of the higher courts are becoming an important source of Russian law.

=== Judicial explanations of law ===
The Russian Supreme Court has no authority to issue general 'explanations' of substantive law or procedural issues in the absence of a relevant 'case or controversy' before it. Legal scholars also participate in these discussions, and the opinions of judges and commentators are published and used as persuasive authority. This process is somewhat analogous to the discussion that scholars take part in American Law Reports or in law reviews. Judges and scholars may codify current practice or, more importantly, address new issues of law to lower courts and instruct them on how to interpret these issues. The texts of the explanations of the law are published and cited by many courts. In contrast, only selected judicial opinions are published. It is not clear which explanations are binding on lower courts, as there is a tension between the Constitution and federal law, on the one hand, and guiding explanatory principles, on the other. Nevertheless, lower courts that ignore relevant explanations are likely to be reversed on appeal.

=== Judicial review of laws for constitutionality by the constitutional court ===
Judicial review enables courts to declare unconstitutional laws void. Constitutional courts thus act as negative legislators. The interpretations of the Constitution in the decisions of the Constitutional Court are also authoritative and binding on the political branches. Ordinary or lower courts may also exercise judicial review. Courts of general jurisdiction may decline to apply (1) any law that violates the Constitution, and (2) any normative regulations, particularly subordinate regulations that contravene statutes. The Supreme Court of the Russian Federation has jurisdiction to determine the constitutionality of regulations issued by government agencies. The Supreme Court has held that lower courts must evaluate the contents of applicable laws or other normative acts for their conformity with the Constitution, and must apply the Constitution in cases of conflict.

=== Other sources ===
==== USSR legislation ====
USSR legislation is used to fill gaps while the new legal system is being established, and is intended to be purely transitional until the Russian parliament can enact new laws. It must not contradict the legislative acts of the Russian Federation.

==== Analogy ====
Judges often reason by analogy, applying the general principles of the law to interpret provisions broadly.

==== Legal consciousness, natural law, good faith and general principles ====
Judges do not rely on natural law, but rather on legal positivism combined with general principles of law. They may rely on 'the requirements of good faith, reasonableness, and justice', as the Civil Code and other codes set out specific principles within their provisions. Other guiding principles include equity, fairness, and general principles of law.

==== Custom ====
The Russian Civil Code explicitly recognises custom as a separate source of law. Traditions may establish rules of decision where there is no dispositive language in statute or other written law.

==== Academic commentary ====
Individual scholars may be influential by drafting legislation or debating proposed legislation. Unlike in some civil‑law systems, academic treatises and learned commentary are not considered a separate source of law and are not cited by judges; however, judges and attorneys rely on them for their arguments.

==== International law ====
All international law and the international treaties of the Russian Federation are part of the Russian domestic legal system. Domestic law gives way to international law under Article 15 of the Constitution. The Constitutional Court has the greatest expertise in the application of international law.

== Type of legal system ==
During the Soviet period, Russian law was considered to be socialist law. Since the fall of the Soviet Union, that is no longer the case, and most scholars have classified the Russian legal system as a civil law system. However, this new classification raises problems similar to those that previously plagued Russia's classification as a socialist law country. Some branches of law could be considered a mix of civil law and common law. For example, civil procedural law is regarded by Dmitry Maleshin as a mixture of both traditions.

== Publications ==
The Constitution of Russia requires the president either to reject laws passed by parliament or to sign and publish them.

The Constitution of Russia and the Federal Law "On the Procedure for the Publication and Entry into Force of Federal Constitutional Laws, Federal Laws, and Acts of the Chambers of the Federal Assembly" of 14 June 1994 (No. 5‑FZ) establish that laws that have not been officially published are not applied.

Federal laws, federal constitutional laws, and acts (usually resolutions) of the chambers of Parliament are subject to publication. International treaties ratified by Parliament are published together with the laws on ratification.

Laws are published within seven days of being signed by the President and come into force after a further ten days, unless otherwise provided in the law itself.

The official publication of a law in Russia is the first publication of the full text:

- in the Parliamentary Newspaper (Парламентская газета) – the official printing body of the Federal Assembly;
- in Rossiyskaya Gazeta (Российская газета) – the official publication of the government;
- in the Collection of Legislation of the Russian Federation (Собрание законодательства Российской Федерации);
- on the Official Internet Portal of Legal Information (www.pravo.gov.ru) (Официальный интернет-портал правовой информации) (since 2011).

== Legal education ==
Legal education has traditionally begun with the specialist degree in law (специалист по правоведению).

== See also ==
- Institute of State and Law
- Russian legal history
- Old Russian Law
- List of Russian legal historians
- Constitution of Russia
- Civil Code of Russia
- Copyright in Russia
- Criminal Code of Russia
- Law of the Soviet Union
- Law of the Russian Empire
- Judicial system of the Russian Empire
- Sudebnik
- Garant database of Russian legislation
- Consultant Plus database of Russian legislation
- Scholars in Russian law
