= Maksim Kovalevsky =

Russian jurist (1851–1916)

Maksim Maksimovich Kovalevsky
- Максим Максимович Ковалевский
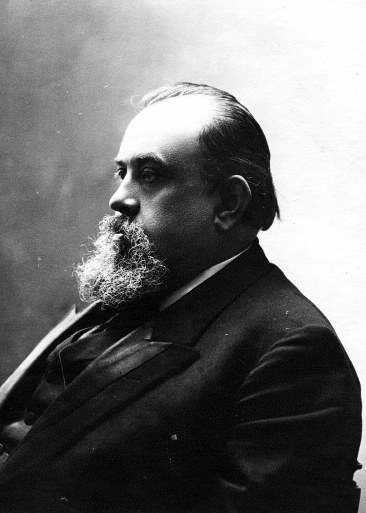
- Maksim Kovalevsky in 1906
- Born: 8 September 1851; Kharkov Governorate, Russian Empire
- Died: 5 April 1916 (aged 64); Petrograd, Russian Empire
- Burial place: Nikolskoe Cemetery
- Education: Imperial Kharkov University
- Occupations: Scientist, jurist
- Known for: Vice-president (1895) and president (1905) of the International Institute of Sociology

Maksim Maksimovich Kovalevsky (Russian: Макси́м Макси́мович Ковале́вский; 8 September 1851 – 5 April 1916) was a jurist and the main authority on sociology in the Russian Empire. He was vice-president (1895) and president (1905) of the International Institute of Sociology. He also held a chair in sociology at the Psycho-Neurological Institute. Kovalevsky was elected into the Russian Academy of Sciences in 1914. The Russian Sociological Society adopted his name in 1916.

== Life ==
Maksim Kovalevsky was born into the Ukrainian noble family of Kovalevsky (of the Dołęga coat of arms) and spent his childhood in a manor near Kharkov. He studied at the Imperial Kharkov University under Dmitri Kachenovsky. He furthered his education in Berlin, Paris, and London, where he made the acquaintance of Karl Marx, Friedrich Engels, Herbert Spencer, and Vladimir Solovyov. He also became involved in the Masonic movement, contributing to its revival in Russia.

After 1878, he read lectures in law at the Imperial Moscow University, where he studied the Russian peasant commune and legal institutions of Caucasian highlanders. Some of his materials were later used by Frederick Engels. Minister Ivan Delyanov did not approve of Kovalevsky's liberal views. In 1886, Kovalevsky was kicked out of the university and then settled in Western Europe, where he came to know all major sociologists and anthropologists of his day.

His cousin's widow, mathematician Sofia Kovalevskaya, arranged for him a lecture program at the Stockholm University. He is portrayed as her lover and fiancé in the Soviet film "Sofia Kovalevskaya" (1985) and in "Too Much Happiness" (2009), a short story by Alice Munro published in the August 2009 issue of Harper's Magazine. Sofia was "adamant that she would not marry Maksim, fearing that if she did, he would begin to take her for granted and look for a mistress". They parted in 1890 and she died from influenza the following year.

After the First Russian Revolution, Kovalevsky resumed his lectures in Russia (in the University of Saint Petersburg), became involved in politics, established a centrist party of democratic reforms (see Progressist Party), was elected into the first State Duma, and appointed into the State Council of the Russian Empire. In 1912 he was nominated for a Nobel Peace Prize. He was scheduled to take part in the peace negotiations for ending World War I but died in April 1916. The crowd that had attended the funeral at the Alexander Nevsky Lavra was enormous.

=== Freemasonry ===
Initiated to three craft degree March 14, 1888, in Paris, in the Russian lodge "Cosmos". January 9, 1906, member of Lodge "Revival". To other sources - member of the Lodge "Cosmos" before 1915. Since 1906 founding member of the Lodge "Renaissance" of the Grand Orient of France. Was Worshipful Master Lodge "Renaissance".

== Ideas ==
Among Kovalevsky's contributions to Russian jurisprudence and social science was a new historical method which combined traditional descriptive comparative analysis with sociological/ethnographic methods. Among his disciples were Pitirim Sorokin, Nikolai Kondratiev, and Nicholas Timasheff (see Sociology in Russia). His early work on the peasant commune influenced Georgy Plekhanov.

As a scholar Kovalevsky was a social evolutionist and called himself a disciple of Auguste Comte. He defined sociology as "the science dealing with the organization and evolution of societies". He believed in progress as one of the inexorable laws of history. For him progress was "the constant expansion of the environment of peaceful coexistence from tribal unity through patriotism to cosmopolitanism".

According to Kovalevsky, economic relations are bound to expand ever further, and the growth of international trade "would bring about the economic integration of the whole world, eliminating the causes of war, and ultimately lead to a world federation of democratic states". Progress depends on population growth as its main driving force.

== Selected works ==
- Kovalevsky, Maxime (1902). Russian Political Institutions: The Growth and Development of These Institutions from the Beginnings of Russian History to the Present Time. University of Chicago Press – via Internet Archive.

== See also ==
- List of Russian legal historians
- Russian legal history

== Gallery ==
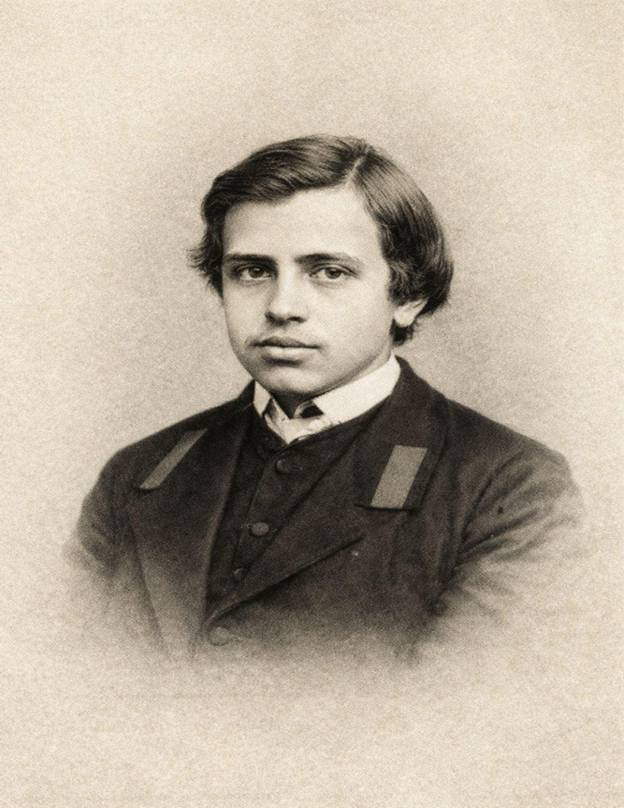
Maksim Kovalevsky as a student at Kharkiv University

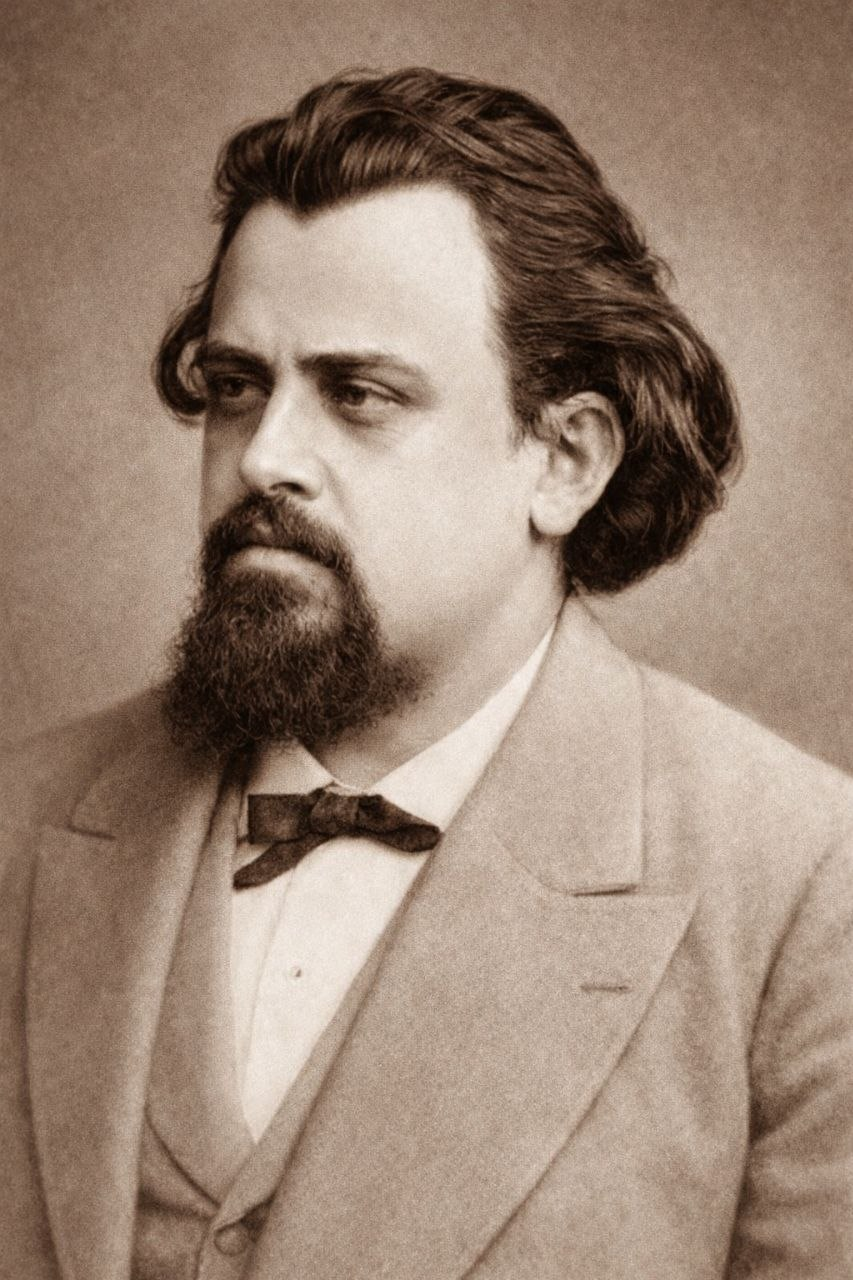
Maksim Kovalevsky in 1876

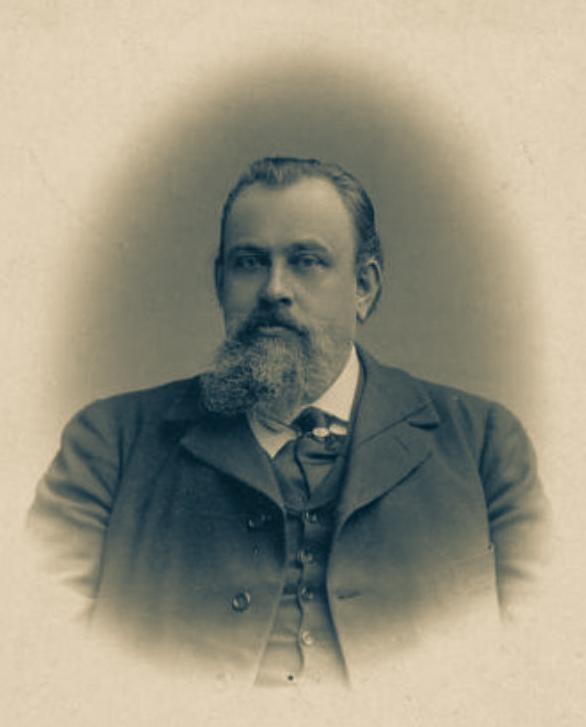
Maksim Kovalevsky, c. 1900
