= Myron Rush =

American academic (1922–2018)

- Born: January 1, 1922; Hyde Park, Chicago, U.S.
- Died: January 8, 2018 (aged 96); Herndon, Virginia, U.S.
- Occupation: Academic
- Known for: Kremlinology
- Spouse: Theresa Neumann
- Children: 3

Academic background
- Education: University of Chicago

Academic work
- Discipline: Political science
- Sub-discipline: Politics and foreign policy of the Soviet Union
- Institutions: Central Intelligence Agency; RAND Corporation; Cornell University

Myron Rush (January 1, 1922 – January 8, 2018) was an American academic who was professor of government at Cornell University, where he focused on the politics and foreign policy of the Soviet Union. Before that he worked for the RAND Corporation and the Central Intelligence Agency. Rush was one of the world's preeminent Kremlinologists. In particular, he was noted for discovering in 1955 that Nikita Khrushchev was winning out in power struggles during the post-Stalin period.

== Early life and education ==
Rush was born in Hyde Park, Chicago, Illinois, on January 1, 1922. He was the son of Orthodox Jewish immigrants who had left the town of Motal due to the threat of pogroms in the Russian Empire. His father worked as a tailor; four older sisters helped raise Myron after their mother died. He attended Hyde Park High School.

Rush went to Woodrow Wilson Junior College, graduating in June 1941. He then earned a full scholarship to the University of Chicago. In September 1942, following the conclusion of the university's summer semester, he received a bachelor's degree from there. American entry into World War II having taken place, many of the new graduates entered military service, and Rush was no exception. He served in the United States Army Air Forces, where he was trained as a meteorologist and subsequently had the position of encryption specialist while stationed at Adak Army Airfield on the Aleutian Islands of Alaska.

Following his discharge, Rush returned to the University of Chicago for graduate work, where he studied under the sociologist Edward Shils and the historian Daniel J. Boorstin; he also attended the London School of Economics for a while, where he was influenced by the philosopher Karl Popper. He received his Ph.D. in the social sciences in 1951, which was granted by the Committee on Social Thought. His dissertation was entitled "Disillusion in American Social Thought 1880–1920".

In 1951, he married Theresa Neumann, a fellow student at the University of Chicago whom he got to know during a Hillel International activity in Israel. They would have three children and be married for 61 years.

== Early career ==
Following graduation, Rush was employed by the Central Intelligence Agency (CIA), first as an economist and then within the Foreign Broadcast Information Service (FBIS). With its focus on the assembly and analysis of open-source intelligence, the FBIS was a locus for watchers of Communist regimes. As an analyst with the FBIS, Rush, who taught himself the Russian language, thus closely studied not just classified materials but also the items in the Soviet press. As such, he began to emerge as a Kremlinologist (a field that dated back to the Stalin era), forming his theories about how to understand the meanings of public communications within Soviet leadership politics.

In 1955, he joined the RAND Corporation, where he was a staff member, assigned to the Social Sciences Division. In late 1955, Rush made an observation about Nikita Khrushchev during the power struggles in the collective leadership period after Stalin's death . The Soviet press had begun capitalizing the phrase "Первый секретарь", meaning "First secretary", when referring to Khrushchev, rather than using the lower case "первый секретарь", a general term that could apply to any number of first secretaries on lower levels of the Communist Party apparatus. From this and similarly minimalist clues, Rush deduced that Khrushchev was making a successful move for top status within the Communist Party of the Soviet Union. Rush included his observation in an internal RAND report written at the time, and subsequently in his 1958 book The Rise of Khrushchev. It was considered a peak example of Kremlinology both in its era and decades later.

Rush continued to monitor and interpret Soviet leadership behavior, giving the name "esoteric communications" to a means through which the Soviets practiced their politics (which he likened in some ways to being a Talmudist). He spent the 1963–64 academic year at Columbia University as a senior fellow of the Research Institute on Communist Affairs, an entity established two years prior by Professor Zbigniew Brzezinski. After that, he returned to RAND.

One of Rush's books, Political Succession in the USSR, was fast-tracked for acceptance and publication by Columbia University Press following the removal from power of Khrushchev in 1964. The 1965 RAND study "Strategic Power and Soviet Foreign Policy", written with colleague Arnold Horelick, was published the following year and became Rush's most cited work.

== Academic career ==
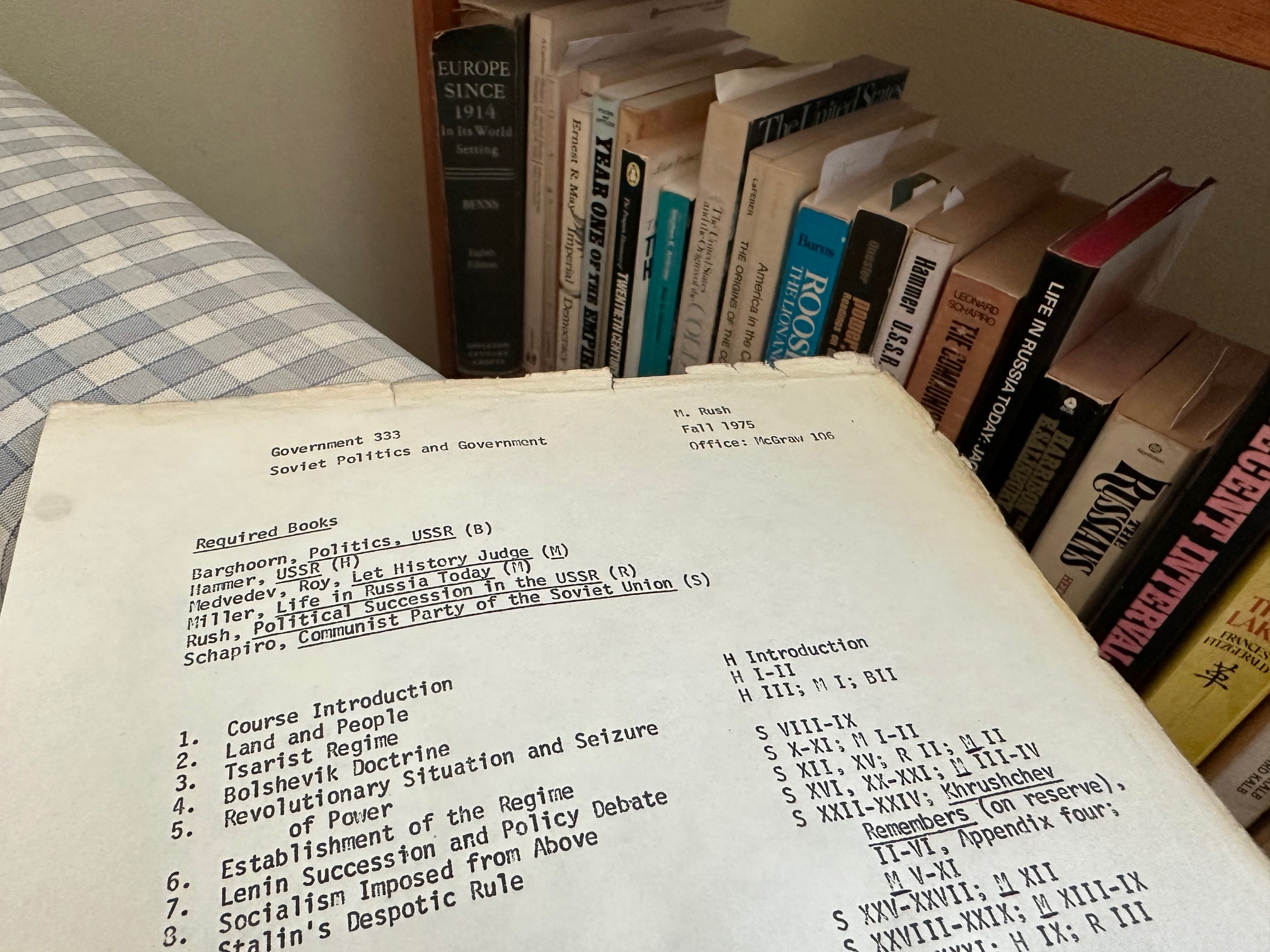
Portion of the Fall 1975 reading list used for Rush's course at Cornell University on the politics and government of the Soviet Union

Rush joined the faculty of the Department of Government at Cornell University in 1965. The family lived in Ithaca, New York. His research work focused on leadership succession problems in the Soviet Union and Eastern Bloc states and on the foreign relations of the Soviet Union. Courses that Rush taught at Cornell included "Government and Politics of the Soviet Union" and "Foreign Policy of the U.S.S.R."; these two courses were important offerings of the government department for many years. Early on, he also co-taught a survey course on Russia with professors from the economics and Russian literature departments.

Rush had a lifelong aversion to totalitarian regimes. He was one of several dozen academics who supported the re-election of Richard Nixon in the 1972 U.S. presidential campaign via a full‐page advertisement in the New York Times; following the revelations of the Watergate scandal the next year, he indicated that he wished he had not taken such a public stance.

In 1977, Rush took a leave from Cornell and became a scholar-in-residence at the CIA. While other academics had consulted with the CIA, Rush's appointment was the beginning of its institutionalized scholar-in-residence program, one that Rush would help make ongoing. Due to the revelations from the Church Committee the year prior regarding abuses by the intelligence community and the existence of hidden ties between the CIA and academia, news of Rush's role provoked protests by graduate students within Cornell's government department. However the department's faculty did not block Rush's appointment, and the professor spent at least a year and a half in that position at CIA Headquarters.

During the next two decades, Rush continued to consult with, or take leaves at, the CIA, believing that the country's interests were best served by academic expertise informing foreign policy and intelligence gathering. During the 1980s, Rush publicly defended the CIA's making recruiting visits on the Cornell campus.

== Final years ==
Rush retired from Cornell in 1992, shortly after the dissolution of the Soviet Union. He became an emeritus professor there, and was known for being mistrustful of post-Soviet Russia. He died at his residence in Herndon, Virginia, in 2018.

== Selected publications ==
- The Rise of Khrushchev (Public Affairs Press, 1958)
- "Esoteric Communication in Soviet Politics", World Politics vol. 11, no. 4 (July 1959)
- Political Succession in the USSR (Columbia University Press, 1965; second edition, 1968)
- Strategic Power and Soviet Foreign Policy (University of Chicago Press, 1966) [co-author with Arnold L. Horelick]
- How Communist States Change Their Rulers (Cornell University Press, 1974)
- "Guns over Growth in Soviet Policy", International Security vol. 7, no. 3 (Winter 1982–83)
- "Fortune and Fate", The National Interest no. 31 (Spring 1993)
