= Ekaterina Nikitichna Blinova =

Russian physicist

- Born: 24 November (7 December) 1906; Kamensk-Shakhtinsky
- Died: 15 December 1981; Moscow
- Resting place: Novodevichy Cemetery
- Education: Rostov State University
- Known for: Dynamic meteorology
- Spouse: Ilya Afanasyevich Kibel

Ekaterina Nikititchna Blinova (Russian: Екатерина Никитична Блинова; born 24 November [7 December] 1906 in Kamensk-Shakhtinsky, died 15 December 1981 in Moscow) was a Soviet geophysicist and meteorologist.

== Life ==
Blinova studied physics and mathematics in Rostov-on-Don at the North Caucasus University. She graduated in 1929. After graduation, she taught physics and mathematics at a school in Rostov-on-Don until 1930. Blinova then worked as a meteorologist in the North Caucasus Weather Bureau Hydrometeorlogical Service of the Soviet Union.

In 1931 Blinova began a three-year internship in Leningrad at the main geophysical observatory named after Aleksandr Voeikov. Blinova specialized in dynamic meteorology and in 1934 successfully defended her dissertation for her candidacy as a doctor. She then became a research assistant at the institute.

In 1936, Blinova continued the work of mathematician Nikolai Kotschin, investigating the conditions for the stability of weather fronts. Then in 1938 she began studying atmospheric circulation. She developed a complete theory of radiative equilibrium in the atmosphere. She examined the wave-like disturbances in the general east–west flow in the atmosphere, which enabled her to quantitatively explain atmospheric centers of activity. She also analyzed the formation and development of tropical cyclones, anticyclones and other macro-processes. After the start of the German-Soviet War and the Leningrad Blockade, she evacuated to Yekaterinburg with the staff of the observatory.

In 1943 Blinova was transferred to the Central Weather Forecasting Institute in Moscow. She developed methods for long-term weather forecasting by integrating the Friedmann vortex equation. She successfully defended her doctoral dissertation in 1946 for her doctorate in physical-mathematical sciences. In 1953 she was elected a corresponding member of the USSR Academy of Sciences.

Blinova worked at the Institute of Applied Geophysics in Moscow beginning in 1958. From 1961 onward she headed the Department of Planetary Dynamics of the Atmosphere of the Meteorological Computing Center at the Hydrometeorological Service of the USSR.

Blinova married the mathematician and meteorologist Ilya Afanasyevich Kibel. Blinova died on 15 December 1981 in Moscow and was buried at the Novodevichy Cemetery.

== Honors ==
- Order of the Badge of Honor (1951)
- Order of the Red Banner of Labor (1975)
- Friedmann Prize (1978)
- Order of the Friendship of Peoples (1980)
