= Kremlinology =

Study of the politics of the Soviet Union

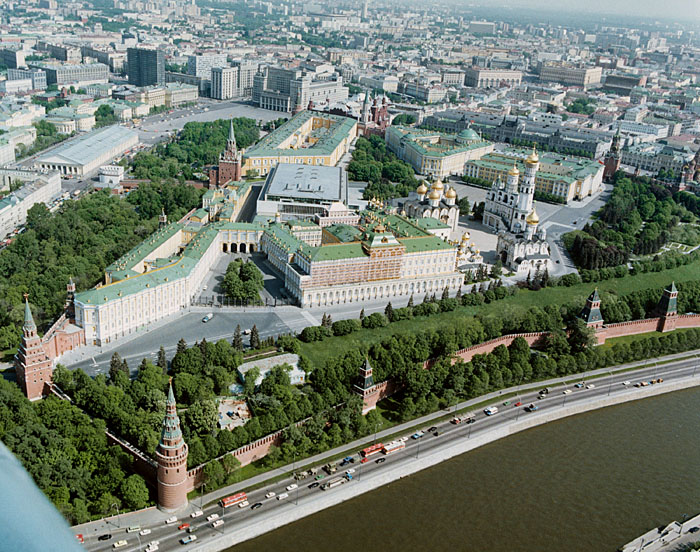
The Kremlin in 1987, whose name served as a metonym for the Soviet leadership.

Kremlinology is the study and analysis of the Soviet government, and subsequently the Russian government, and their policies. The term emerged during the Cold War to describe a method of inference developed in response to the opacity and secrecy of the Soviet political system. Named after the Kremlin, the seat of the former Soviet government, the discipline was pioneered by the works of Boris Nicolaevsky and Franz Borkenau, among other scholars. By extension, Kremlinology is sometimes used to denote attempts to understand the inner workings of any secretive organization or decision-making process through the interpretation of indirect or symbolic evidence, for example in analyses of contemporary North Korea.

Sovietology, by contrast, refers to the broader interdisciplinary study of the Soviet Union as a political, economic, social, and ideological system. Scholars in these fields are distinct from transitologists, who study legal, economic and social transitions from communism to market capitalism.

== Historiography ==
Academic Sovietology after World War II and during the Cold War was dominated by the "totalitarian model" of the Soviet Union, stressing the absolute nature of Joseph Stalin's power. The "totalitarian model" was first outlined in the 1950s by political scientist Carl Joachim Friedrich, who argued that the Soviet Union and other Communist states were totalitarian systems, with the personality cult and almost unlimited powers of the "great leader" such as Stalin.

The "revisionist school" beginning in the 1960s focused on relatively autonomous institutions which might influence policy at the higher level. Matt Lenoe describes the "revisionist school" as representing those who "insisted that the old image of the Soviet Union as a totalitarian state bent on world domination was oversimplified or just plain wrong. They tended to be interested in social history and to argue that the Communist Party leadership had had to adjust to social forces." These "revisionist school" historians such as J. Arch Getty and Lynne Viola challenged the "totalitarian model" approach to Soviet history and were most active in the Soviet archives.

=== Techniques ===
During the Cold War, lack of reliable information about the country forced Western analysts to "read between the lines" and to use the tiniest titbits, such as the removal of portraits, the rearranging of chairs, positions at the reviewing stand for parades in Red Square, the arrangement of articles on the pages of the party newspaper Pravda, and other indirect signs to try to understand what was happening in internal Soviet politics. A classic instance was Myron Rush, at the time an analyst for the RAND Corporation, making a key deduction from the choice of capital or small initial letters in the Soviet press in the phrase such as "First Secretary".

To study the relations between Communist fraternal states, Kremlinologists compared the statements issued by the respective national Communist parties, looking for omissions and discrepancies in the ordering of objectives. The description of state visits in the Communist press were also scrutinized, as well as the degree of hospitality lent to dignitaries. Kremlinology also emphasized ritual, in that it noticed and ascribed meaning to the unusual absence of a policy statement on a certain anniversary or holiday.

In the German language, such attempts acquired the somewhat derisive name "Kreml-Astrologie" (Kremlin Astrology), hinting at the fact that its results were often vague and inconclusive, if not outright wrong.

=== After the Cold War ===
The term Kremlinology is still in use in application to the study of decision-making processes in the politics of the Russian Federation. In popular culture, the term is sometimes used to mean any attempt to understand a secretive organization or process, such as plans for upcoming products or events, by interpreting indirect clues.

While the Soviet Union no longer exists, other secretive states still do, such as North Korea, for which Kremlinology-like approaches are still used by the Western media. Such study is sometimes called "Pyongyangology", after the country's capital Pyongyang.

== See also ==
- Soviet Union–United States relations
- Russia–United States relations
- Team B
- Predictions of the collapse of the Soviet Union
- China watcher
- Kennan Institute
- Slavic studies
- Russian studies
- List of Russian legal historians
- List of scholars in Russian law
- Vaticanology
- Soviet and Communist studies
- Smolensk Archive
