= Grigory Tunkin =

Soviet jurist and diplomat

Grigory Tunkin (undated)

Grigory Ivanovich Tunkin (Russian: Григорий Иванович Тункин; 13 October 1906 – 23 August 1993) was a Soviet jurist, diplomat, Corresponding Member of the Soviet Academy of Sciences (1974), and a Meritorious Scientist of the RSFSR (1972).

== Early life ==
Tunkin was born in 1906 in the far north of Russia into an Arkhangelsk peasant family. Like his famous countryman, Mikhail Lomonosov, Tunkin left for Moscow to study sciences. Though, eventually, he became the leading international lawyer in the Soviet Union, Tunkin's interests were always multi-dimensional. He wrote his first dissertation on the history of law of the ancient world, spoke many languages fluently and was good at mathematics.

== Diplomatic career ==
Tunkin was a graduate of the Institute of State and Law, Moscow (1935) and conducted post-graduate study at the same Institute from 1935-1938.

From 1939 to 1941, he was the Assistant Chief of the Legal Department of the NKID (Narodnii Komissariat Inostranih Del), or People's Commissariat for Foreign Affairs, the forerunner to the Ministry of Foreign Affairs. From 1941 to 1942, he was the Consul of the USSR at Kermanshah, Iran. He was the Counsellor and Chargé d'Affaires at the USSR Embassy in Ottawa (1942–1944), Chief of the First Far-Eastern Department of the Ministry of Foreign Affairs of the USSR; Minister-Counsellor at the USSR Embassy at Pyongyang, North Korea (1949–1950); Chief of the First Far-Eastern Department (1951–1952) and Chief of the Treaty and Legal Department of the USSR Ministry of Foreign Affairs (1952–1965).

While heading the Legal Department of the Foreign Ministry of the Soviet Union from 1957 to 1966, Tunkin was a member, and in 1961 President, of the United Nations International Law Commission. He led Soviet delegations to international conferences such as the first and second UN Conferences on the Law of the Sea (1958, 1960), USSR Delegation at the Antarctic Conference (1959) and the Vienna Conference on Diplomatic Relations (1961).

== Academic career ==
From 1946 to 1965, with several interruptions, Tunkin served as the Chief of the Chair of International Law at the Moscow Institute of Law, the High Diplomatic School (at the Ministry of Foreign Affairs) and taught as professor of international law at the Moscow Institute of International Relations (MGIMO).

From 1965, Tunkin was appointed professor and Chief of the Chair of International Law at Moscow State University's Faculty of Law. Prof. Tunkin also served as the president of the Soviet Association of International Law from its founding in 1957 until his death.

== Contributions ==
Tunkin has been considered "the most influential Soviet theoretician of international law during the last decades of the Soviet period". He is the author of nine leading books on international law and general theory of state and law (ТЕОРИЯ ГОСУДАРСТВА И ПРАВА) and more than 250 journal articles. His works (including all of his books) were translated into many languages, including English.

Tunkin's textbooks on international law formed the core of the international law curriculum in the USSR for over forty years. Following the dissolution of the USSR, his works have had lasting influence. In 2000, his major treatise Theory of International Law was republished in Moscow under the editorship of L.N. Shestakov (-2009), who succeeded him as the Chief of Chair of international law at Moscow State University.

Among Tunkin's other contributions, he served as a Member of the Curatorium of the Hague Academy of International Law, as an honorary member of the Institut de droit international. He received a doctorate honoris causa from Paris University (Pantheon-Sorbonne) and Budapest University, the USSR State Prize (1987) and the Encyclopædia Britannica Award (1990).

== See also ==
- List of Russian legal historians
- Tunkin, Grigory; Butler, William (2003). Theory of International Law. London: Wildy, Simmonds. ISBN 1-898029-60-1.
