= Yevgeny Korovin =

Soviet jurist (1892–1964)

- Born: Yevgeny Aleksandrovich Korovin; 12 October [O.S. 30 September] 1892; Moscow, Russian Empire
- Died: 23 November 1964 (aged 72); Moscow, Soviet Union
- Occupations: Jurist and professor
- Years active: 1915-1964
- Notable work: International Law of the Transition Period

Yevgeny Aleksandrovich Korovin (Russian: Евге́ний Алекса́ндрович Коро́вин; 12 October [O.S. 30 September] 1892 – 23 November 1964) was a Soviet jurist specializing in international law. He was a prominent early scholar of space law and is "considered the founder of the Russian science of space law, in whose origin he played a singular role." Korovin held several academic and legal positions at Moscow State University, the United Nations, and the Permanent Court of Arbitration in the Hague.

== Career ==
Korovin graduated from the Moscow State University Faculty of Law in 1915. In his early career, Korovin lectured in numerous universities and institutes of higher learning in Moscow, including the Diplomatic Academy. In 1923, he became a Professor of Law at Moscow State University. At this time, Prof. Korovin was also an assistant of the Institute of Soviet Law, the forerunner of the Institute of State and Law of the Academy of Sciences of the Soviet Union.

In 1935, Korovin became a Member of American Academy of Political Science. In 1938, he defended doctor thesis LLD (habilitation) in law. He worked in the military legal academy of the Soviet Army, and had a short stint working for the United Nations Preparatory Commission between 1945 and 1946. He became a Corresponding Member of the Academy of Sciences of the Soviet Union in 1946, and a Member of Permanent Court of Arbitration in the Hague in 1957.

== Bibliography ==
- «Международное право переходного времени», М., 1924 г. (International Law of the Transition Period)
- Korovine, Eugène (1934). "La conquête de la stratosphère et le droit international" [The conquest of the stratosphere and international law]. Revue Générale de Droit International Public (in French). XLI: 675–86.

== See also ==
- History of international law in Russia
- List of Russian legal historians
- Russian legal history
