= Aza Takho-Godi =

Soviet and Russian philologist (1922–2025)

- Аза Тахо-Годи
- Born: 26 October 1922; Makhachkala, Dagestan ASSR, Russian SFSR
- Died: 8 September 2025 (aged 102)
- Education: Moscow State Pedagogical University
- Spouse: Aleksei Losev (m. 1954; died 1988)

Aza Alibekovna Takho-Godi (Russian: Аза Алибековна Тахо-Годи; 26 October 1922 – 8 September 2025) was a Soviet and Russian philologist.

Takho-Godi graduated from the Philological Faculty of Moscow State Pedagogical University in 1944. She defended her dissertation, titled «Поэтические тропы Гомера и их социальный смысл», at Lomonosov Moscow State University. She lectured at Taras Shevchenko National University of Kyiv from 1948 to 1949, then worked as an associate professor at Moscow Regional Pedagogical Institute from 1949 to 1957. Beginning in 1958, she worked at Lomonosov Moscow State University. In 1959, she defended her doctoral dissertation at the Gorky Institute of World Literature. Her thesis was called «Античность и русские революционные демократы в связи с предшествующей им лит.-эстетической традицией».

In 1965, she received the title of Professor. From 1962 to 1996, she headed the Department of Classical Philology at Lomonosov Moscow State University. Under her editorship, the complete works of Plato in Russian were published (1990–1994). She supervised the publication of Aleksei Losev's works, and also organized the Library-Museum "A.F. Losev House". Her bibliography from 1952 to 2023 includes around 1,000 items. Her book "Life and Destiny: Memories" has been reprinted twice (2009; 2023).

Takho-Godi turned 100 in October 2022, for which she was awarded the Order of Equal-to-the-Apostles Princess Olga by Patriarch Kirill of Moscow. She died on 8 September 2025, at the age of 102.

== Family ==
In 1954, she married philosopher and philologist Aleksei Losev, whom she had met in 1944.

== Recognition ==
- Doktor Nauk in Philological Sciences (1959)
- Professor of Lomonosov Moscow State University (1965)
- Honoured Professor of Lomonosov Moscow State University (1992)
- Honoured Scientist of the Russian Federation (1998)
- Honoured Scientist of Dagestan (2012)
- Order of Equal-to-the-Apostles Princess Olga, First Degree (2022)
