= Leonid Kamarovsky =

Russian law professor (1846–1912)

Leonid Alekseevich Kamarovsky (March 15, 1846 – August 12, 1912, Леонид Алексеевич Камаровский) was a professor of international law at Moscow State University. He is considered to be one of the most influential pre-revolutionary Russian international lawyers.

From 1890 to 1903, he taught at the Imperial Lyceum of Tsarevich Nikolai. He taught at several other Russian universities. From 1909 to 1912, he was a member of the Moscow city duma.

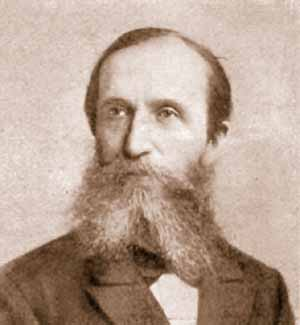
Комаровский Л.А. 1846–1912

== See also ==
- List of Russian legal historians
