= History of international law in Russia =

The history of international law in Russia is marked by several important periods, among these:

- Pre-Petrine international law;
- Peter I of Russia's reforms & Russia's Europeanization/Westernization, particularly in legal thought;
- 18th Century;
- 19th Century and liberalization;
  - Friedrich Martens
- Soviet international law;
  - Evgeny A. Korovin
- Post-Soviet harmonization with international law;

In Russian legal history, international and comparative method dates back to the sixteenth century.

== See also ==
- Russian legal history
- History of public international law
