= Vladimir Grabar =

Russian and Soviet jurist

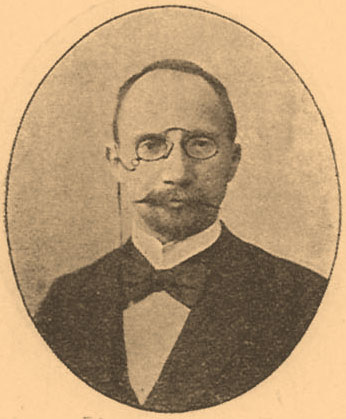
- Born: January 10, 1865; Vienna, Austrian Empire
- Died: November 26, 1956 (aged 91); Moscow, Soviet Union
- Education: Imperial Moscow University (1888)
- Occupation: Professor of law

Vladimir Emmanuilovich Grabar (10 (22) January 1865, Vienna — 26 November 1956, Моscow) — was a Russian and Soviet jurist. The brother of painter Igor Grabar, and the husband of philologue and translator Maria Grabar-Passek. He is one of the leading specialists in international law of the pre-revolutionary and post-Revolutionary Soviet period. Grabar held a number of leading posts during his impressive and broad career, including: professor of international law, academician, dean, legal advisor to the Imperial Russian government and the Soviet state, internationally recognized jurist and historian. His academic and professional career encompassed the last decades of the Russian empire and the first four decades of the Soviet period. His most notable work on the history of international law in Russia (1647-1917) guaranteed a visible place not only in the Russian legal academy but also abroad.

== Early life ==
Grabar was born on 10/22 January 1865 in Vienna, Austria at a home located on Währinger Hauptstrasse, 214, during the rise of European national movements. Grabar's maternal grandfather (Adolf Dobryansky) was one of the leaders of the Carpatho-Rusyns, striving for incorporation of Galician Ruthenia (East Galicia, Carpathian Ruthenia and Bukovina) into a unified Russian empire. Dobryansky gave all of his children and grandchildren Russian names, Olga, Vladimir and Igor. Grabar's parents devoted themselves to revolutionary work and were persecuted by the Austro-Hungarian authorities (see The Case of Olga Grabar). His father, Emanuel Ivanovich Grabar ( - 1910)- was a volunteer in the militia of Lajos Kossuth. Thereafter, Emanuel Grabar obtained a legal education in the Hungarian University at Pest and was admitted to the bar. In 1869, he was elected as a deputy to the Hungarian parliament to represent the Hungarian-Russian district of Máramaros County. For some time, Emanuel Grabar published the satirical journal The Owl «Сова», successfully publishing six editions prior to being censored and abolished by the government. The persecution led to the family's emigration in 1871. At first the family immigrated to Italy, where over the course of three years the children had a personal tutor in the form of a patriarch Terletsky, serving the colony of Carpathian emigrants. Afterwards, the family immigrated along with the colony to Paris. In 1876, Emanuel Grabar arrived in Russia and began teaching under the pseudonym Khrabrov (Храбров), specializing in modern languages, first in Egorevsk, then in Ryazan, followed by Izmail, and finally Tartu (1893–1918), where he was appointed the deputy rector of the university.

== See also ==
Russian legal history
