= Sovietology =

Interdisciplinary field of academic study focused on the Soviet Union

Sovietology refers to the interdisciplinary study of the Soviet Union as a political, economic, social, and ideological system.

In the scholarly literature, the term Sovietology has been used with two distinct meanings. In its narrower sense, it refers primarily to the study of Soviet politics and is understood as a field or subdiscipline of political science. In a broader sense, Sovietology is used to mean "Soviet studies". In this usage, it designates an aggregate of subfields from several disciplines, united by a common focus on the Soviet Union or the communist area. Another term, Kremlinology, referred to the study and interpretation of the Soviet government policies, specifically as a method of inference developed to analyze decision-making within an opaque and highly secretive political system.

== Historiography ==
The systematic academic study of the Soviet Union developed in the United States primarily in response to the strategic and security demands of the Cold War. Despite the scale and novelty of the Soviet economic experiment after 1917, scholarly work on the Soviet economy remained limited and marginal until the late 1940s.

From World War II onward, research expanded as the United States sought reliable assessments of Soviet economic capacity. The field was institutionalized after the war and sustained by federal funding motivated by national security, notably through the National Defense Education Act of 1958 and later the National Council for Soviet and East European Research, established in 1978 and primarily funded by the Department of Defense.

Academic Sovietologists and government analysts, especially within the CIA, formed the two main research communities. Government analysts focused on macroeconomic and military estimates, while academics emphasized analytical frameworks, methodological development, and training specialists, with ideas and personnel largely flowing from academia to government. Outside the United States, particularly in the United Kingdom, Sovietology developed with less emphasis on national security. British scholars and independent researchers played a greater role in debate and criticism, while American Sovietology remained more centralized and institutionally constrained.

According to historian Nicolas Werth, the opening of Soviet archives after the dissolution of the Soviet Union in 1991 brought Sovietology to an end: "the history of the USSR has definitively ceased to be the preserve of 'Sovietologists' and has become a field of study of contemporary historians."

== See also ==
- Kremlinology
- Soviet and communist studies
