= List of scholars in Russian law =

== Imperial Russia ==
=== Imperial Russian jurists ===
- Semyon Efimovich Desnitsky (1740–1789)
- Konstantin Alekseevich Nevolin (1806–1855)
- Aleksandr Ivanovich Herzen (Алекса́ндр Ива́нович Ге́рцен) (1812–1870) was a major Russian political philosopher and is known as the "father of Russian socialism".
- Boris Nikolayevich Chicherin (Борис Николаевич Чичерин) (1828–1904) was a Russian jurist and political philosopher, who worked out a theory that Russia needed a strong, authoritative government to persevere with liberal reforms. By the time of the Russian Revolution, Chicherin was probably the most reputed historian and philosopher in Russia. Uncle of Georgy Chicherin.
- Friedrich Martens (Фёдор Фёдорович Мартенс) (1845–1909), one of the so-called fathers of international law and Russia's representative to the Hague convention.
- Sergey Muromtsev (1850–1910)
- Leonid Alekseevich Kamarovsky (1846-1912), professor of international law at Moscow State University
- Maksim Maksimovich Kovalevsky (1851–1916), a Russian jurist and one of the founders of the Progressist Party. Kovalevsky taught international law at Moscow University.
- Paul Vinogradoff (1854–1925), professor of Jurisprudence at University of Oxford.
- Vasily Maklakov (1869–1957), studied with Pavel Vinogradoff and played an active part in the organization of the Russian Constitutional Democratic Party. Elected to the Second State Duma in 1907. Following the February Revolution of 1917, Maklakov aspired to take the office of Minister of Justice in the Provisional Government. After the post went to another professional lawyer, Alexander Kerensky, Maklakov was put in charge of the government's "legal commission". He also wrote several books on the history of social thought and the Russian liberal movement.
- Ioanikii Aleksieevich Malinovskii (1868–1932) was a historian of law, legal scholar, academician of All-Ukrainian Academy of Sciences.

== Soviet era ==
=== Soviet jurists ===
- Vladimir Lenin (1870–1924)
- Nikolai Ivanovich Bukharin (1888–1937), among other things, drafted the Constitution of the Soviet Union.
- Georgy Vasilyevich Chicherin (1872–1936)
- Evgeny Pashukanis (1891–1937)
- Andrey Vyshinsky (1883–1954)

=== Non-Soviet scholars in Soviet law ===
- Edward Hallett Carr (1892–1982). Carr's writings include biographies of Fyodor Dostoevsky (1931), Karl Marx (1934), and Mikhail Bakunin (1937), as well as important studies on international relations and his History of Soviet Russia (14 vol., 1950–78). During World War II, Carr was favourably impressed with what he regarded as the extraordinary heroic performance of the Soviet people, and towards the end of 1944 Carr decided to write a complete history of the Soviet Russia from 1917 comprising all aspects of social, political and economic history in order to explain how the Soviet Union withstood the challenge of the German invasion. The resulting work was his 14 volume History of Soviet Russia, which took the story to 1929, the last year for which abundant original sources were available. In Carr's view, Soviet history went through three periods in the inter-war era and was personified by the change of leadership from Vladimir Lenin to Joseph Stalin.
- Harold J. Berman (1918–2007)

== Post-Soviet Russia ==
=== Non-Russian scholars in Post-Soviet Russian law ===
- William E. Butler
- Richard S. Wortman, professor of history at the Harriman Institute, Columbia University. The Development of a Russian Legal Consciousness (1976) explores the ideological and institutional dimensions of legal history prior to the Great Reforms and raises issues that remain relevant for Russia today. The book's translation into Russian in 2004 reignited interest in the Imperial era of Russian legal history.
- William Partlett, associate professor of law at Melbourne Law School.
- Lauri Mälksoo, academician, Professor of International Law at the University of Tartu.
- William E. Pomeranz (1960–), adjunct professor at Georgetown University and Director of the Kennan Institute at the Woodrow Wilson International Center for Scholars. Law and the Russian State: Russia’s Legal Evolution from Peter the Great to Vladimir Putin (2018) covers the history of Russian law during the imperial, Soviet, and post-Soviet periods.

== See also ==
Organizations

- Ministry of Justice of the USSR
- Prosecutor General of the USSR
- Prosecutor General of Russia
- Supreme Court of Russia
- Supreme Court of the Soviet Union

Other

- List of Russian legal historians
- History of international law in Russia
