= Harold J. Berman =

American legal scholar (1918–2007)

Harold Joseph Berman
- Born: February 13, 1918; Hartford, Connecticut, U.S.
- Died: November 13, 2007 (aged 89); New York City, U.S.
- Education: Dartmouth College (BA); Yale University (MA, JD)
- Scientific career
- Fields: Soviet law, comparative law, international law, legal history, philosophy of law, law and religion
- Workplaces: Harvard Law School; Emory University School of Law

Harold Joseph Berman (February 13, 1918 – November 13, 2007) was an American legal scholar who was an expert in comparative, international and Soviet/Russian law as well as legal history, philosophy of law and the intersection of law and religion. He was a law professor at Harvard Law School and at Emory University School of Law for more than sixty years, and held the James Barr Ames Professorship of Law at Harvard before he was appointed as the first Robert W. Woodruff Professor of Law at Emory. He has been described as "one of the great polymaths of American legal education".

== Early life and education ==
Born in Hartford, Connecticut, Berman received a bachelor's degree from Dartmouth College in 1938, where he studied under Eugen Rosenstock-Huessy, and a master's degree and Juris Doctor from Yale University in 1942 and 1947, respectively. He married Ruth Harlow of Northampton, Massachusetts on June 10, 1941, and served as a cryptographer in the U.S. Army in the European Theatre of Operations from 1942 to 1945. He received the Bronze Star for his service.

== Career ==
While serving in London, Berman became concerned that the Western Allies and the USSR were on a path to continue their pre-war enmity, and that Americans knew very little about the Soviet Union. Upon returning to law school after the war, he decided to learn as much as he could about the Soviet legal system, with the goal of teaching Soviet law and ultimately promoting peace between America and the Soviet Union by focusing on the importance of the rule of law. During his last year of law school, he wrote an article about Soviet family law that led to an offer of a teaching position at Stanford Law School. In 1948 he joined the faculty of the Harvard Law School (HLS), where he built a reputation as one of the world's best-known scholars of Soviet law, and held the Story Professorship of Law and later the Ames Professorship of Law. He was a frequent visitor to Russia as a guest scholar and lecturer, even during the height of the Joseph McCarthy era. In 1958, he represented the estate of Arthur Conan Doyle in Soviet courts, in an unsuccessful attempt to collect copyright royalties from the government of the USSR. Around 1960, Berman also observed court trials involving transnational inheritance transfers, and he was repeatedly called as an expert witness on the rights of Soviet heirs in cross-border inheritance cases.

In 1961, at the height of the Cold War, he took his wife and four children to the Soviet Union for a sabbatical year in Moscow. They lived in the center of the city, in the Hotel National across from Red Square and the Kremlin. His three younger children (Jean, age 14 at the time; Susanna, age 12; and John, age 10) attended the local public school. The eldest, Stephen, audited classes at Moscow State University. Prof. Berman, with an invitation to study from the Soviet Academy of Sciences, was invited to teach a course for the law students of Moscow University on the American Constitution. The class was packed. Unfortunately, Berman decided to stop the course after the first three or four lectures when he learned that students were being questioned by officials about their interest in the subject.

Following his sabbatical year in Moscow, Berman continued to teach his course on Soviet law at HLS, as well as courses on legal history and international trade. A growing interest in the interaction between law and religion also began to flourish. In 1985, approaching the mandatory retired age at Harvard Law School, Berman left HLS for the Emory University School of Law, where he was the first person to hold the Robert W. Woodruff Professorship of Law — the highest honor Emory can bestow upon a faculty member. Berman, one of the pioneers of the study of law and religion, played an integral role in the development of Emory's Law and Religion Program, now the Center for the Study of Law and Religion (CSLR), where he served as Senior Fellow. He is also considered one of the founders of the Journal of Law and Religion. "He was my mentor, but far more important than that, he was one of the few legal scholars in the country willing to write about both law and religion," said Professor Frank S. Alexander, CSLR founding director, who persuaded Berman to join the faculty at Emory Law after being one of his students at Harvard in the early 1970s.

After the fall of the Soviet Union in 1989, Berman consulted leading Russian officials on proposed legislation and led seminars for political leaders and academics on the development of legal institutions.

One of the world's most distinguished scholars of Soviet and post-Soviet law, Berman was a Fellow of The Carter Center, with a special focus in U.S.-Russian relations. He visited Russia more than 40 times since 1955 as a guest scholar and lecturer on the topic of American law, and he was the founder and co-director of the American Law Center in Moscow, a joint venture of Emory Law and the Ministry of Justice of the Russian Federation. He also took his expertise on Communist and post-Communist law to Eastern Europe and China in recent years, where his writings are well known and widely used.

In 1991, Berman was awarded the degree of Doctor of Laws, honoris causa, by the Catholic University of America; in 1995, the degree of Doctor of Humane Letters, honoris causa, by the Virginia Theological Seminary; and in 2000, the degree of Doctor, honoris causa, by the Russian Academy of Sciences Law University. He was elected a Fellow of the American Academy of Arts and Sciences in 1997.

In his later years, Berman worked to redress global societal inequalities and to establish systems of trust, peace, and justice in developing countries. He co-founded and co-chaired the World Law Institute, an organization that sponsors educational programs in global law. The Institute opened the first Academy of World Law at the Central European University in Budapest in 2000 and a later comparable program in Moscow.

=== Scholarship ===
A prolific scholar, Berman wrote 25 books and more than 400 scholarly articles, including Law and Revolution: The Formation of the Western Legal Tradition and The Nature and Functions of Law, which is in its 6th edition. The law journal Constitutional Commentary described Law And Revolution as "the standard point of departure for work in the field" [of Western legal history]. On his death, The New York Times characterized Berman as "a scholar ... whose forceful scholarship altered thinking about Western law's origins".

==== Books ====
- Law and Revolution: The Formation of the Western Legal Tradition
- Law and Revolution II: The Impact of the Protestant Reformations on the Western Legal Tradition
- The Nature and Functions of Law (First Edition, 1958; Sixth Edition with William R. Greiner and Samir N. Saliba, 1996)
- Soviet Criminal Law and Procedure: The RSFSR Codes
- The Interaction of Law and Religion
- Soviet Law in Action: The Recollected Cases of a Soviet Lawyer (1953) with Boris A. Konstantinovsky
- Soviet Military Law and Administration (1955) with Miroslav Kerner
- Soviet-American Trade in Legal Perspective: Proceedings of a Conference of Soviet and American Legal Scholars (1975)
- Religion and International Law (with Mark Janis)
- Justice in the U.S.S.R.: An Interpretation of Soviet Law (Harvard, 1963)

==== Articles ====
- Introduction to the World Law Institute
- The Influence of Christianity Upon the Development of Law

=== Recognition ===
In March 2004, a symposium of some 500 scholars and students gathered at Emory University School of Law to celebrate the scholarship of its three Robert W. Woodruff Professors of Law, Harold J. Berman, Martha Albertson Fineman, and Michael J. Perry, and Visiting Professor Martin E. Marty. In 2008, Emory Law Journal published a special issue titled In Praise of a Legal Polymath: A Special Issue Dedicated to the Memory of Harold J. Berman (1918–2007).

== See also ==
- List of Russian legal historians
