= Institute of State and Law =

Scientific legal center in the Russia

Coordinates: 55.750261°N 37.605472°E

Institute of State and Law (RAS/РАН)
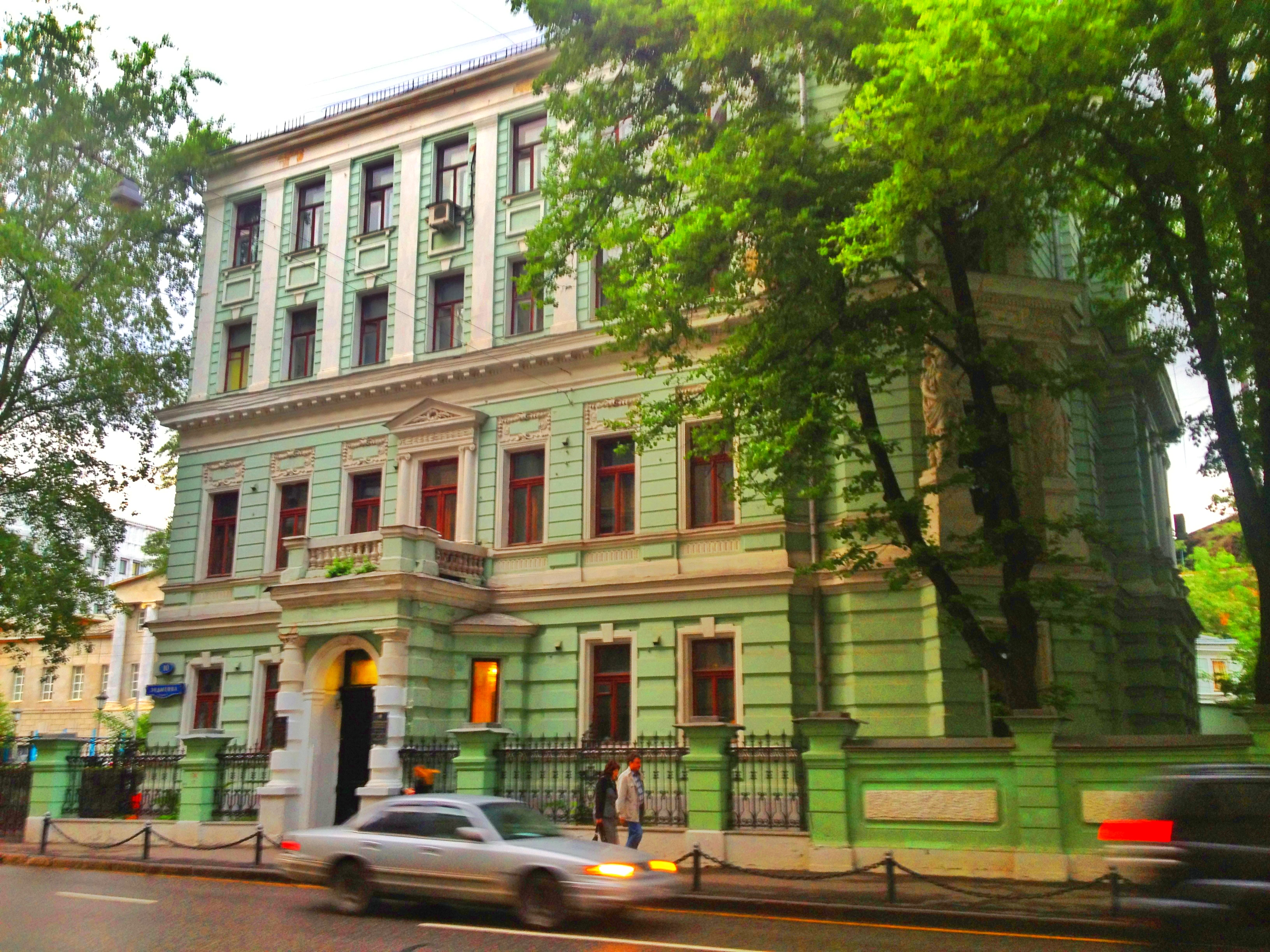
- Type: Public
- Established: 1925
- Director: Andrei G. Lisitsin-Svetlanov
- Students: 350
- Location: ul. Znamenka 10; 119841 Moscow, Moscow, Russia
- Website: www.igpran.ru/en

Headquarters in Moscow.

The Institute of State and Law (ISL) of the Russian Academy of Sciences (RAS) (Russian: Институт государства и права Российской академии наук (ИГП РАН)) is the largest scientific legal center in the Russian Federation. The ISL is part of the Philosophical, Sociological, Psychological, and Law Department of RAS. The ISL has 350 employees, including three Academicians, three Corresponding Members of RAS, nearly one hundred Doctors and more than one hundred Candidates of Legal Science. Academician B. N. Topornin is the Academician-Secretary of the Department and the Director of ISL.

== History ==
It was initially founded as the Institute of Soviet Construction at the Communist Academy. Now the center of Russian scientific legal training and consultative support for State institutions, the ISL also coordinates legal research work, trains legal science staff, and collaborates with international legal groups. By Edict of the Presidium of Supreme Soviet of the USSR of 16.04.75, the ISL was awarded the Labor Red Banner Order for its services in the development of legal sciences and the training of a scientific staff of lawyers. A later edict of the President of Russian Federation of 3.12.94 (No. 2174) entrusted the ISL with the Analytical Center of Legal Policy of the President of the Russian Federation.

=== Prior Designations ===
In its history, the ISL has undergone several transformations. Previously, it has been called:

- Institute of Soviet Development (Institut Sovetskogo Stroitelstva - ISS) (1925–1930)
- Institute of Soviet Law of the Russian Association of scientific institutes of the social sciences (1923–1930)
- Institute of Soviet Development and Law (Institut Sovetskogo Stroitelstva i Prava) (1930–1936)
- Institute of State Law of the Soviet Academy of Sciences (Institut Gosudarstvenogo Prava AN SSSR) (1936–1938)
- Institute of Law of the Soviet Academy of Sciences (Institut Prava AN SSSR) (1938–1960)
- Institute of State and Law of the Soviet Academy of Sciences (Institut Gosudarstva i Prava AN SSSR) (1960–1991)
- Current form: Institute of State and Law of the Russian Academy of Sciences.

In the 1950s, the ISL carried the honorary name of Andrey Vyshinsky.

=== Location ===
The ISL is located on ulitsa Znamenka 10, Moscow (119841), formerly ulitsa Frunze.

== Scope of research ==
The Institute now carries out fundamental and applied studies in the theories of governance and law; studies mechanisms and tendencies in law creation, law implementation and law enforcement; and takes part in drafting legislation.

=== Teaching ===
The ISL also contains a teaching unit founded in 1993. The Academic Law University (Russian: Академический правовой университет (АПУ); translit: Akademichiskii Pravovoi Universitet, APU) offers an undergraduate as well as graduate law degrees. The professoriate of the APU is composed of ISL fellows. In 2010, the Academic Law University was renamed to the Academic Law Institute (Russian: Академический правовой институт (АПИ); translit: Akademichiskii Pravovoi Institut, API).

== Library and archive ==
The library of the ISL contains over 300,000 volumes.

== Notable academics ==
- Evgeny A. Korovin (1892–1964)
- Evgeny Pashukanis (1891–1937), Director of Institute of Law, Russian Academy of Sciences (1925–1936)
- Andrey Vyshinsky
- Gennady Danilenko, law professor and author

== See also ==
- Communist Academy
- Institute of State and Law of Ukrainian National Academy of Sciences
