= Moscow trials =

1936–1938 show trials held by Stalin to purge political opposition

The Moscow trials were a series of show trials held by the Soviet Union between 1936 and 1938 at the instigation of Joseph Stalin. They were nominally directed against Trotskyists and members of the Right Opposition of the Communist Party of the Soviet Union. There were three Moscow trials: the first, in August 1936, was the Case of the Trotskyite–Zinovievite Terrorist Center; the second, in January 1937, was the Case of the Anti-Soviet Trotskyist Center; the third and last trial, in March 1938, was the Case of the Anti-Soviet "Bloc of Rightists and Trotskyites". The Old Bolsheviks, veteran revolutionaries who had been prominent in the party since before or during the October Revolution, and top officials of the Soviet secret police were the most well-known defendants at each trial. International observers, including some who were initially open to believing the confessions of the defendants, became steadily more disillusioned as the absurdity of the trials escalated with each round of proceedings.

Most defendants, including the Old Bolsheviks, accused of various conspiracies against the state, were executed. The trials are generally seen as part of Stalin's Great Purge, a campaign to rid the party of current or prior opposition, including Trotskyists and leading Bolshevik cadre members, who partially represented the growing discontent in the Soviet populace resulting from the coldhearted management of the economy. Although Stalin's rapid industrialization and his first five-year plan created upward mobility for the urban population, it had not gone smoothly, or without costs. By 1928–1933, the chaos and falling wages associated with the industrialisation drive, combined with the closing down of dissident speech and brutality of forced agricultural collectivization, had led to an acute economic and political crisis, especially among the sizable peasant population. The government was acutely conscious of this fact. Stalin, the NKVD (the Soviet secret police), and the Party increasingly interpreted even the slightest glimmer of dissent as anti-state activity, and took steps to prevent it taking the form of an opposition against their increasingly authoritarian rule.

Several prominent figures (such as Andrei Bubnov, Alexander Beloborodov and Nikolai Yezhov) were sentenced to death during outside these trials.

== Background ==
The years of Stalin's centralisation of leadership, 1923–1929, involved a crucial set of political struggles that would frame the later accusations at the Moscow Trials. Bolshevik politicians who Stalin had routed during his rise to the top job, the Old Bolsheviks such as Leon Trotsky, Grigory Zinoviev, Lev Kamenev and Nikolai Bukharin, were the most well-known defendants at the trials. Despite fits and starts, the accusations against them steadily escalated in the years leading up to the trials, particularly following the 1932 Ryutin affair and the assassination of Sergei Kirov in 1934.

=== Power struggles in the USSR ===
Grigory Zinoviev, Lev Kamenev, and Joseph Stalin formed a ruling triumvirate in early 1923 after Vladimir Lenin had become incapacitated from a stroke. In the context of the series of defeats of communist revolutions abroad (crucially the German revolutions of 1919, but also later the Northern Expedition), which left the Russian Revolution increasingly isolated in a backward country, the triumvirate was able to affect the marginalization of Leon Trotsky in an internal party political conflict over the issue of Stalin's theory of Socialism in One Country versus Trotsky's theory of Permanent revolution.

A few years later, Zinoviev and Kamenev joined the United Front in an alliance with Trotsky which favored Trotskyism and opposed Stalin specifically. Consequently, Stalin allied with Nikolai Bukharin and defeated Trotsky in a power struggle. Trotsky was expelled from the Soviet Union in 1929 and Kamenev and Zinoviev temporarily lost their membership in the Communist Party.

=== The Ryutin affair ===
In September 1932, the Soviet secret police obtained a copy of the so-called "Ryutin Platform", named after one of its authors, Martemyan Ryutin, a prominent oppositionist who had been readmitted to the party after recanting his views. He was expelled yet again, and sentenced to ten years in prison, after the document was discovered. The platform spread alarm through the central government and police services with its calls for Stalin and the party leadership to be "removed by force". Zinoviev, Kamenev, Trotskyist Karl Radek and others were found to have read the platform and not notified authorities, leading to their expulsion from the Communist Party. This entire event later came to be known as the Ryutin affair.

At this time, Zinoviev and Kamenev entered in contact with Trotskyists in the USSR and again joined Trotsky against Stalin, this time in secret. They formed a bloc of opposition with the Trotskyists, along with some rightists. Ivan Nikitich Smirnov, also a defendant at the first Moscow Trial, was one of the bloc's leaders. Like Ryutin and many others, Smirnov recanted his oppositional stances and rejoined the party in late 1929, in what he called a "tactical manoeuvre". He urged his followers to do the same, in order to allow Trotskyists to restart their oppositional activities in secret. This act, of an oppositionist disavowing their own activity, only to rejoin the party and pick up where they left off, became known as "double-dealing".

For many years, Pierre Broué and a number of historians assumed that this bloc was dissolved after the arrest of Smirnov and Ryutin. However, some documents found after Broué's search showed that the Underground Left Opposition stayed active even in prison. In fact, the prisons became their centers of activities.

The Ryutin platform was only one example of a forceful oppositionist trend in international leftist politics. In fact, many Trotskyists and ultra-leftists of this era, including Trotsky himself, had begun to write of the importance of removing Stalin, as they thought his policies would inevitably lead to the defeat of the international socialist movement. These calls for Stalin's violent removal only increased the paranoia of the authorities.

=== The assassination of Sergei Kirov ===
In December 1934, Sergei Kirov was assassinated. 15 oppositionists were subsequently found guilty of direct or indirect involvement, and sentenced to be executed. Zinoviev and Kamenev were found guilty of "moral complicity" in Kirov's murder and in January 1935 they were both sentenced, in secret, to prison terms of ten and five years respectively.

Although Nikolai Yezhov, then secretary of the Central Committee, broached the theory of their direct participation in the crime at the June 1935 Central Committee plenum, his speech was never published. No other party members spoke in favour of his theory, or defended them against Yezhov's allegations, at the plenum, and it took more than a year for Zinoviev and Kamenev to be re-tried and executed. Why Stalin and the Soviet government waited so long to put them on trial is unknown; scholars believe that at this time Yezhov simply did not have sufficient evidence.

Regardless, paranoia within the NKVD escalated following Kirov's assassination, with many alleged "counter-revolutionary groups" liquidated in the year before the first Moscow Trial.

== The trials ==
Each of the Moscow trials followed a similar script. Almost all the defendants confessed to the accusations put to them, and each was charged under Article 58 of the RSFSR Penal Code — a vague legal code criminalising "counter-revolutionary activity". However, the absurdity of allegations against the accused steadily escalated as they progressed. In the first trial the defendants were cast as a gang of minor oppositionists, has-beens who had plotted to assassinate Stalin and other government leaders, with the Gestapo presented as shadowy enablers of the Trotskyists and their plans. Zinoviev and Kamenev were well-known as oppositionists, and had been in prison eighteen months before their appearance in the dock. But from 1937 onwards, the alleged conspiracy began to expand into a plot involving deeply covert enemies who had worked against the Party from the time of Lenin, vast wrecking of the economy and collaboration with secret agents from Japan, Britain and Germany to dismember the Soviet Union, conduct a coup and restore capitalism.

=== August 1936: The first Moscow trial ===
The first Moscow Trial, officially known as the Case of the Trotskyite–Zinovievite Terrorist Center, sometimes called the Trial of the Sixteen, was held from 19 to 24 August 1936.

==== Conspiracy and investigation ====
In December 1935 V. Balitskii, head of the Ukrainian NKVD, sent Moscow a detailed report about the arrests of 33 members, some of whom had confessed, of a "Trotskyist, Nationalist, Menshevik", "terrorist" organisation, which allegedly had ties to Ivan Kuzmich Fedotov, the rector of the Gorky Pedagogical Institute. A parallel investigation into another group in Gorky also pointed investigators in the direction of the institute. On 1 January 1936, the GUGB NKVD stated in a message to its Ukrainian counterparts that they had exposed a Valentin Olberg, the "emissary of Trotsky". Olberg, a stateless multinational communist who had recently entered the USSR on a purchased Honduran passport, was an important activist in European Trotskyism, with close ties to Trotsky and his son Lev Sedov. Three years earlier, in June 1932, the German Communist Party had broken into Olberg's apartment and sent the NKVD an extensive collection of letters to him from Trotsky and Sedov.

Olberg was arrested, along with his wife and brother, on 5 January 1936. Fedotov was detained five days later on 10 January, after returning from vacation. NKVD investigators accused Olberg of being a Trotskyist and a terrorist; he initially resisted their accusations, providing contradictory testimony and denying that he was a Trotskyist — up until his interrogation on 13 February. During this interrogation, and from that point onwards, Olberg began to confess to the charges, stating that he was indeed sent by Trotsky to help prepare the assassination of the USSR's leaders, in particular Stalin. Him and his brother, Pavel Olberg, also claimed under interrogation that they and the Trotskyist movement had links to the Gestapo.

Internal NKVD telegrams sent to Stalin in mid-1936 laid out much of the alleged evidence. In addition to the NKVD's denunciations, reports from its international spy ring, confessions of those under arrest and the letters sent by the KPD, archived reports allege that investigators seized letters from Trotsky, weapons, ammunition, explosives and liquid for removing ink from passports in implicated apartments, universities, and on the persons of those under arrest.

Olberg's testimony was subsequently used by the NKVD to arrest many alleged oppositionists in the USSR, and the information he provided convinced Stalin to make him a crucial defendant in the 1936 Moscow Trial. It is possible he confessed under the influence, or threat, of torture, although there is not evidence of either in archival sources. The confessions established supposed conspiratorial activities that became common charges in the USSR over the next few years: the murder of Kirov; preparations to assassinate the leaders of the Soviet Communist Party; and collaboration with foreign powers. According to the Olbergs and others arrested, their group planned to send conspirators into the crowds at the May Day parade in Moscow, and throw bombs onto Stalin's podium. A parallel organisation was supposed to bomb Andrei Zhdanov's car in Leningrad. Independent confirmation of these alleged plans is lacking.

In June and July 1936, Zinoviev and Kamenev were interrogated about their participation in the organisation. When interrogated they denied being part of any Trotsky-led conspiracy, but by 23 July, Kamenev had confessed to membership of the organisation, accusing Zinoviev of being a lead instigator. Three days later on 26 July, Zinoviev was confronted by one of his followers, Karev, who accused him directly; after repeated denials, Zinoviev asked that the interrogation be stopped so he could make a full confession. Soon afterwards, Zinoviev submitted a 540-page confession, "A Deserved Sentence", written by him in prison.

To this day, it is not entirely clear why those arrested confessed to these crimes. Historians have not found definitive proof that they were tortured, but memoir sources claim they agreed to confess on condition that they receive a direct guarantee from the entire Politburo, and that their lives and those of their families and followers would be spared.

===== Zborowski's reports =====
Mark Zborowski was an undercover NKVD agent deep inside the Trotskyist movement, working alongside to Lev Sedov. Among his duties were reporting the details of Trotskyist networks across Europe, which the NKVD knew little of. During Olberg's interrogations in the spring of 1936, the NKVD sent Zborowski directives asking him to acquire information about Kurt Landau (then unknown to them), and Valentin Olberg. While his reports were not mentioned in public, they provided the NKVD with crucial operational intelligence.

Over the course of his time alongside Sedov, Zborowski also sent reports to his handlers which aligned with parts of Olberg's testimony. In June 1936, before the announcement of the first Moscow Trial, Zborowski described Sedov, anxious to learn more about the situation in the USSR, suggesting he enter the country to appraise the situation: "We will give you instructions, money and a passport. You will go for two or three months, travel around to several locations to addresses that I will give you." This description shared distinct similarities to Olberg's confession about his trip and Sedov's instructions.

On 8 February 1937, he reported a conversation shared with Lev Sedov in the latter's apartment on 22 January earlier that year, with Sedov giving an account of his views that matched descriptions given by Olberg and his comrades who also spoke to Sedov. According to Zborowski, Sedov quite unexpectedly stated: "Now it seems more than anything... Stalin must be killed". The next day, Sedov attempted to broach the same topic before being hushed by another associate. Several days later, Zborowski reported that Sedov "tried to prove 'theoretically' that terrorism does not contradict Marxism... but there are also provisions in which terrorism is necessary... [he] emphatically stressed the need to kill Comrade Stalin". Sedov then attempted to gauge Zborowski's opinion, asking him if he was ready to commit a terrorist act.

==== Trial ====
This first trial was held in the small October Hall of the House of the Unions (chosen instead of the larger Hall of Columns, used for earlier trials). 16 defendants were in the dock, tried by the Military Collegium of the Supreme Court of the USSR, with Vasiliy Ulrikh presiding. Procurator General of the Soviet Union Andrey Vyshinsky was the chief prosecutor.

The 16 defendants fell into three broad groups. The first consisted of Old Bolsheviks: Grigory Zinoviev, Lev Kamenev, Grigory Yevdokimov, Ivan Bakayev, Sergei Mrachkovsky, Vagarshak Ter-Vaganyan, and Ivan Smirnov. The second group comprised Soviet Communists of the younger generation: Yefim Dreitzer, Isak Reingold, Richard Pickel and Eduard Holtzman. The third group was made up of foreign oppositionists who had emigrated to the USSR at various points: Fritz David, Valentin Olberg, Konon Berman-Yurin, Moissei Lurye and Nathan Lurye.

The main charge was forming a terror organization, the so-called "Trotskyite–Zinovievite Terrorist Center", with the purpose of killing Stalin and other members of the Soviet government. Defendant Ivan Nikitich Smirnov was blamed by his co-defendants for being the leader of the Center which planned Kirov's assassination. Olberg was a key piece of the trial. Unlike many of the other defendants, he had close ties with Sedov and Trotsky, who supposedly told him about the various meetings they had with the Old Bolsheviks who headed the Trotskyist opposition. His claims about his and the opposition's links to the Gestapo, and allegations that many of the other defendants were aware of these links, enabled the prosecution to frame the defendants as Fascist agents. Olberg and five other political émigrés were in the dock at the trial: they represented a warning to the population about the dangers posed by foreigners. In court, he exercised his "right to put questions to the witnesses" and constantly undercut Ivan Smirnov, who was one of the only defendants to challenge the allegations.

One defendant, the Old Bolshevik Eduard Holtzman, was accused of conspiring with Trotsky in Copenhagen at the Hotel Bristol in 1932, where Trotsky was giving a public lecture. A week after the trial it was revealed by a Danish Social Democratic newspaper that the hotel had been demolished in 1917.

Vyshinsky achieved international infamy as the prosecutor at the Zinoviev–Kamenev trial, lashing its defenseless victims with vituperative rhetoric. He often punctuated speeches with phrases like "Dogs of the Fascist bourgeoisie", "mad dogs of Trotskyism", "dregs of society", "decayed people", "terrorist thugs and degenerates", and "accursed vermin". This dehumanization aided in what historian Arkady Vaksberg calls "a hitherto unknown type of trial where there was not the slightest need for evidence: what evidence did you need when you were dealing with 'stinking carrion' and 'mad dogs'?" Vyshinsky would later be responsible for the Soviet preparations for the trial of the major German war criminals by the International Military Tribunal.

After the conclusion of the trial, the three judges presiding found each of the defendants guilty, sentencing many of them to be executed.

=== January 1937: The second Moscow trial ===
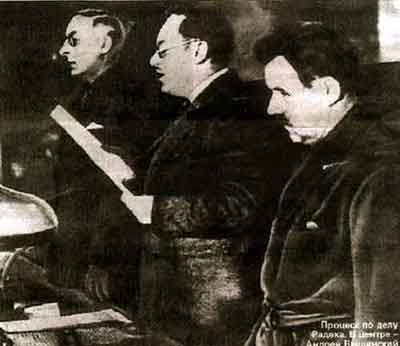
Vyshinsky (centre), reading the indictment, in 1937

The second trial, officially known as the Case of the Anti-Soviet Trotskyist Center, or the Trial of the Seventeen, occurred between 23 and 30 January 1937.

This trial included 17 defendants purported to belong to the "Parallel Anti-Soviet Trotskyist Center". The first group consisted of prominent figures from the Left Opposition and the party leadership: Georgy Pyatakov, a former Deputy People's Commissar for Heavy Industry; Karl Radek, a journalist and former secretary of the Communist International; Grigory Sokolnikov, a former Deputy People's Commissar for Foreign Affairs and ambassador to Britain; Leonid Serebryakov, a former Secretary of the Central Committee; Nikolai Muralov, a hero of the Russian Civil War; and Mikhail Boguslavsky. The second group was made up of industrial managers and engineers from the Kuznetsk Basin, five of whom had already been condemned at the Kemerovo trial: Yakov Drobnis, Boris Norkin, Alexander Shestov, Mikhail Stroilov and Valentin Arnold. The third group comprised economic and transport officials: Yakov Livshits, a First Deputy People's Commissar for Railways, Ivan Knyazev, Stanislav Rataichak, Yosif Turok, Ivan Hrasche and Gavriil Pushin. Alexander Beloborodov was also arrested and intended to be tried along with Radek, but did not make the confession required of him, and so he was not produced in court.

Thirteen of the defendants were eventually executed by shooting (Pyatakov and Serebryakov among them). The rest (including Radek and Sokolnikov) received sentences in labour camps, where they were later executed. Radek was spared as he implicated others, including Bukharin, Rykov, and Mikhail Tukhachevsky, setting the stage for the Trial of Military Leaders and the Trial of the Twenty One.

Radek provided the pretext for the purge on a massive scale with his testimony that there was a "third organization separate from the cadres which had passed through [Trotsky's] school" as well as "semi-Trotskyites, quarter-Trotskyites, one-eighth-Trotskyites, people who helped us, not knowing of the terrorist organization but sympathizing with us, people who from liberalism, from a Fronde against the Party, gave us this help."

By the third organization, he meant the last remaining former opposition group, the Rightists, led by Bukharin, whom he implicated by saying:

I feel guilty of one thing more: even after admitting my guilt and exposing the organisation, I stubbornly refused to give evidence about Bukharin. I knew that Bukharin's situation was just as hopeless as my own, because our guilt, if not juridically, then in essence, was the same. But we are close friends, and intellectual friendship is stronger than other friendships. I knew that Bukharin was in the same state of upheaval as myself. That is why I did not want to deliver him bound hand and foot to the People's Commissariat of Home Affairs. Just as in relation to our other cadres, I wanted Bukharin himself to lay down his arms.

At the time, many Western observers who attended the trials said that they were fair and that the guilt of the accused had been established. They based this assessment on the confessions of the accused, which were freely given in open court, without any apparent evidence that they had been extracted by torture or drugging. U.S. ambassador Joseph E. Davies wrote in Mission to Moscow:

In view of the character of the accused, their long terms of service, their recognized distinction in their profession, their long-continued loyalty to the Communist cause, it is scarcely credible that their brother officers ... should have acquiesced in their execution, unless they were convinced that these men had been guilty of some offense.^{[*]} It is generally accepted by members of the Diplomatic Corps that the accused must have been guilty of an offense which in the Soviet Union would merit the death penalty.

^{*} The Bukharin trial six months later developed evidence which, if true, more than justified this action. Undoubtedly those facts were all full known to the military court at this time.

All "confessions" were extracted under the most severe torture. Images of the accused were not shown.

=== June 1937: The Tukhachevsky Affair ===
The June 1937 Tukachevsky Affair, officially known as the Case of the Trotskyist Anti-Soviet Military Organization, was a secret trial of a group of Red Army generals, including Marshal of the Soviet Union Mikhail Tukhachevsky, before a military tribunal.

This trial featured the same type of allegations against the defendants and it is traditionally considered one of the key events of the Great Purge. Mikhail Tukhachevsky and the senior military officers Iona Yakir, Ieronim Uborevich, Robert Eideman, August Kork, Vitovt Putna, Boris Feldman, and Vitaly Primakov were accused of anti-Communist conspiracy and sentenced to death. They were executed on the night of June 12, immediately after the verdict delivered by the Military Collegium of the Supreme Court of the USSR. This trial triggered a massive purge of the Red Army.

To this day, it is not fully clear why Stalin decided to liquidate his army's General Staff. Several components may have fed the hasty and urgently convened arrest and execution of the generals: historically rocky relations between party and army; the fact that the army was an armed faction that could challenge Stalin; ongoing criticism of Stalin's man, Voroshilov, by Tukhachevsky and others; and rumours of a coup from Europe, including a possible German disinformation campaign. Most of the Stalinists, and even some oppositionists writing after the fact, seemed to genuinely believe in the generals' guilt, but no evidence has come to light suggesting the guilt of the generals in any kind of conspiracy.

=== March 1938: The third Moscow trial ===
The third show trial, in March 1938, officially known as the Case of the Anti-Soviet "Bloc of Rights and Trotskyites" and occasionally known as The Trial of the Twenty-One, tied together all the loose threads from earlier trials.

The trial included 21 defendants alleged to belong to the "Bloc of Rights and Trotskyites". The first group consisted of prominent party leaders: Nikolai Bukharin, a Marxist theoretician, former head of the Communist International and member of the Politburo; Alexei Rykov, a former premier and Politburo member; Nikolai Krestinsky, a former Politburo member and ambassador to Germany; and Christian Rakovsky, a former ambassador to Great Britain and France. The second group comprised senior state and party officials: Arkady Rosengolts, former People's Commissar for Foreign Trade; Vladimir Ivanov, former People's Commissar for Timber Industry; Mikhail Alexandrovich Chernov, former People's Commissar for Agriculture; Grigori Grinko, former People's Commissar for Finance; and Isaak Zelensky, former Secretary of the Central Committee. The third group consisted of regional leaders: the Uzbek leaders Akmal Ikramov and Fayzulla Khodzhayev, and Vasily Sharangovich, a former first secretary in Belorussia. The fourth group was drawn from the security apparatus: Genrikh Yagoda, the former head of the NKVD, and the NKVD officer Pavel Bulanov. The fifth group consisted of three Kremlin doctors: Lev Levin, Dmitry Pletnyov and Ignaty Kazakov. The remaining defendants were Sergei Bessonov, Prokopy Zubarev, Venyamin Maximov-Dikovsky and Pyotr Kryuchkov.

The fact that Genrikh Yagoda was one of the accused showed the speed at which the purges were consuming their own. Meant to be the culmination of previous trials, it now alleged that Nikolai Bukharin and others had conspired to assassinate Lenin and Stalin numerous times after 1918 and had murdered Soviet writer Maxim Gorky by poison in 1936. The group also stood accused of espionage. Bukharin and others were claimed to have plotted the overthrow and dismemberment of the Soviet Union in collusion with agents of the German and Japanese governments, among other charges.

The preparation for this trial was delayed in its early stages due to the reluctance of some party members to denounce their comrades. It was at this time that Stalin personally intervened to speed up the process and replaced Yagoda with Yezhov. Stalin also observed some of the trial in person from a hidden chamber in the courtroom. On the first day of the trial, Nikolai Krestinsky caused a sensation when he repudiated his written confession and pleaded not guilty to all the charges. However, he changed his plea the next day after "special measures," which dislocated his left shoulder among other things.

Anastas Mikoyan and Vyacheslav Molotov later claimed that Bukharin was never tortured, but it is now known that his interrogators were given the order "beating permitted" and were under great pressure to extract confessions out of the "star" defendant. Bukharin held out for three months, but threats to his young wife and infant son, combined with "methods of physical influence", wore him down. However, when he read his confession, amended and corrected personally by Stalin, he withdrew his whole confession. The examination started all over again, with a double team of interrogators.

==== Bukharin's confession ====
Bukharin's confession in particular became the subject of much debate among Western observers, inspiring Koestler's novel Darkness at Noon and a philosophical essay by Maurice Merleau-Ponty in Humanism and Terror among others. His confessions were somewhat different from others in that, while he pleaded guilty to general charges, he denied knowledge of any specific crimes. Some astute observers noted that he would allow only what was in his written confession and refused to go any further. The fact that he was allowed to write in prison (he wrote four book-length manuscripts including an autobiographical novel, How It All Began, a philosophical treatise, and a collection of poems – all of which were found in Stalin's archive and published in the 1990s) suggests that some kind of deal was reached as a condition for his confession. He also wrote a series of emotional letters to Stalin, protesting his innocence and professing his love for Stalin, which contrasts with his critical opinion of Stalin and his policies as expressed to others and with his conduct in the trial.

There are several possible interpretations of Bukharin's motivation (besides coercion) in the trial. Koestler and others viewed it as a true believer's last service to the Party (while preserving a modicum of personal honor), whereas Bukharin's biographers Stephen Cohen and Robert Tucker saw traces of Aesopian language, with which Bukharin sought to turn the tables and conduct a trial of Stalinism (while still keeping his part of the bargain to save his family). Bukharin himself speaks of his "peculiar duality of mind" in his last plea, which led to "semi-paralysis of the will" and Hegelian "unhappy consciousness." It is also possible that the decapitation of the Red Army, who Bukharin may have believed that were his last hope in stopping the trials, contributed to his decision to confess.

Whatever the case, the result was a curious mix of fulsome confessions and subtle criticisms of the trial. After disproving several charges against him (one observer noted that he proceeded to demolish, or rather showed he could very easily demolish, the whole case), Bukharin said that "the confession of the accused is not essential. The confession of the accused is a medieval principle of jurisprudence", his point being that the trial was solely based on coerced confessions. He finished his last plea with "the monstrousness of my crime is immeasurable, especially in the new stage of the struggle of the U.S.S.R. May this trial be the last severe lesson, and may the great might of the U.S.S.R. become clear to all."

Romain Rolland and others wrote to Stalin seeking clemency for Bukharin, but all the leading defendants were executed except Rakovsky and two others (they were killed in prison in 1941). Despite the promise to spare his family, Bukharin's wife, Anna Larina, was sent to a labor camp, but she survived.

== Reactions ==
In most countries, Communist Party leaders lauded the trials and attacked critical or neutral voices. A number of American communists and fellow travellers outside of the Soviet Union signed The Moscow Trials: A Statement by American Progressives. These included Langston Hughes and Stuart Davis, who would later express regrets.

Some contemporary observers who thought the trials were inherently fair cite the statements of Molotov, who, while conceding that some of the confessions contain unlikely statements, said there may have been several reasons or motives for this—one being that the handful who made doubtful confessions were trying to undermine the Soviet Union and its government by making dubious statements in their confessions to cast doubts on their trial. Molotov postulated that a defendant might invent a story that he collaborated with foreign agents and party members to undermine the government so that those members would falsely come under suspicion, while the false foreign collaboration charge would be believed as well. Thus, the Soviet government was in his view the victim of false confessions. Nonetheless, he said the evidence of mostly out-of-power Communist officials conspiring to make a power grab during a moment of weakness in the upcoming war truly existed.

In the political atmosphere of the 1930s, the accusation that there was a conspiracy to destroy the Soviet Union was not considered improbable, but few outside observers were aware of the events inside the Communist Party that had led to the purge and the trials.

=== Europe ===
In Britain, the lawyer and Labour MP Denis Nowell Pritt, for example, wrote: "Once again the more faint-hearted socialists are beset with doubts and anxieties," but "once again we can feel confident that when the smoke has rolled away from the battlefield of controversy it will be realized that the charge was true, the confessions correct and the prosecution fairly conducted," while socialist thinker Beatrice Webb "was pleased that Stalin had 'cut out the dead wood'." Communist Party leader Harry Pollitt, in the Daily Worker of March 12, 1938, told the world that "the trials in Moscow represent a new triumph in the history of progress." The article was ironically illustrated by a photograph of Stalin with Yezhov, himself shortly to vanish and his photographs airbrushed from history by NKVD censors.

=== The United States ===
Left-leaning American magazine The Nation did not make a definitive judgement on the veracity of the 1936 trial's accusations, but the editors highlighted the lack of material evidence presented in court as well as the tensions between the USSR's dictatorial tendencies — as represented by the trial — and the "democratic hopes" of the country's new constitution. In one early article covering the first trial, the magazine wrote in an editorial: "It is unthinkable that the Soviet government should proceed with an open trial unless it has proof of guilt and equally unthinkable that Léon Trotsky should have conspired with agents of fascist Germany to overthrow the Soviet regime ... Beyond that one transcends the limits of even reasonable conjecture."

The Moscow trials were viewed negatively by most Western observers, including many liberals. The New York Times noted the absurdity in an editorial on March 1, 1938: "It is as if twenty years after Yorktown somebody in power at Washington found it necessary for the safety of the State to send to the scaffold Thomas Jefferson, Madison, John Adams, Hamilton, Jay and most of their associates. The charge against them would be that they conspired to hand over the United States to George III."

For Bertram Wolfe, the outcome of the Bukharin trial marked his break with Stalinism.

== Counter-investigations ==
=== The Dewey Commission ===
In May 1937, the 'Commission of Inquiry into the Charges Made against Leon Trotsky in the Moscow Trials', commonly known as the Dewey Commission, was set up in the United States by supporters of Trotsky to establish the truth about the trials. The commission was headed by the noted American philosopher and educator John Dewey, who led a delegation to Mexico, where Trotsky lived, to interview him and hold hearings from April 10 to April 17, 1937. The hearings were conducted to investigate the allegations against Trotsky who publicly stated in advance of them that if the commission found him guilty as charged he would hand himself over to the Soviet authorities. However, the proceedings put little pressure on Trotsky's statements and accepted much of them at face value, sometimes breaking the cross-examination when it was becoming "too improper" for Trotsky' case. The spirit of the proceedings of the commission fell short of a serious investigation even in the judgement of its own members: having resigned from the commission, Carleton Beals said in a public statement:

The hushed adoration of the other members of the committee for Mr. Trotsky throughout the hearings has defeated all spirit of honest investigation. [...] The cross-examination consisted in allowing Trotsky to spout propaganda charges with eloquence and wild denunciations with only rare efforts to make him prove his assertions. The work of the commission has largely consisted in an effort to fill in the gaps left by Mr. Trotsky's own attorney in the proving of Trotsky's case. Mr. Trotsky was given five days and a half to present his case. The cross-examination by the commission lasted only a day and a half. One day of that was largely taken up by a banal cross-examination by [commission's attorney] Mr. Finerty on the history of the tactics and politics of the Russian revolution, conducted in such kindergarten fashion and with such eager adoration for Mr. Trotsky by the commissioners as to make the proceedings the laughing stock of any intelligent person. The rest of the commission's time was expended in pointless erudite questions on dialects and other matters little related to the Moscow trials. There was no valid attempt to get at the guilt or innocence of Mr. Trotsky.

Having failed to prove Trotsky's innocence, the commission brought to light evidence which established that some of the specific charges made at the trials could not be true.

The Dewey Commission published its findings in the form of a 422-page book titled Not Guilty. Its conclusions asserted the innocence of all those condemned in the Moscow trials. In its summary the commission wrote: "Independent of extrinsic evidence, the Commission finds:

- That the conduct of the Moscow trials was such as to convince any unprejudiced person that no attempt was made to ascertain the truth.
- That while confessions are necessarily entitled to the most serious consideration, the confessions themselves contain such inherent improbabilities as to convince the Commission that they do not represent the truth, irrespective of any means used to obtain them.
- That Trotsky never instructed any of the accused or witnesses in the Moscow trials to enter into agreements with foreign powers against the Soviet Union [and] that Trotsky never recommended, plotted, or attempted the restoration of capitalism in the USSR."

The commission concluded: "We therefore find the Moscow Trials to be frame-ups." For example, in Moscow, Pyatakov had testified that he had flown to Oslo in December 1935 to "receive terrorist instructions" from Trotsky. The Dewey Commission established that no such flight had taken place.

On 9 February 1937, the Daily Worker published An Open Letter To American Liberals, signed by 51 left-wing activists including Corliss Lamont and Lillian Hellman. The letter reiterated the charges of the trials, accusing the American Committee for the Defense of Leon Trotsky and the Commission's members of acting as unwitting pawns of the Trotskyist movement.

=== British Provisional Committee ===
In Britain, the trials were also subject to criticism. A group called the British Provisional Committee for the Defence of Leon Trotsky was set up. In 1936, the Committee published an open letter in the Manchester Guardian calling for an international inquiry into the Trials. The letter was signed by several notable figures, including H. N. Brailsford, Harry Wicks, Conrad Noel, Frank Horrabin and Eleanor Rathbone. The Committee also supported the Dewey Commission. Emrys Hughes, the British MP, also attacked the Moscow trials as unjust in his newspaper Forward.

== Legacy ==
Many of the surviving members of the Lenin-era party leadership were tried. Of 1,966 delegates to the party congress in 1934, 1,108 were arrested. Of 139 members of the Central Committee, 98 were arrested. Three out of five Soviet marshals (Alexander Ilyich Yegorov, Vasily Blyukher, Tukhachevsky) and several thousand Red Army officers were arrested or shot. The key defendant, Leon Trotsky, was living in exile abroad, but he still did not survive Stalin's desire to have him dead and was assassinated by a Soviet agent in Mexico in 1940.

Historian Isaac Deutscher regarded the Moscow trials "as the prelude to the destruction of an entire generation of revolutionaries".

While Khrushchev's Secret Speech denounced Stalin's personality cult and purges as early as 1956, rehabilitation of Old Bolsheviks proceeded at a slow pace. Nikolai Bukharin and 19 other co-defendants were officially completely rehabilitated in February 1988. Yagoda, who was deeply involved in the great purge as the head of NKVD, was not included. In May 1988, rehabilitation of Zinoviev, Kamenev, Radek, and co-defendants was announced.

After the death of Stalin, Nikita Khrushchev repudiated the trials in a speech to the Twentieth Congress of the Communist Party of the Soviet Union:

The commission has become acquainted with a large quantity of materials in the NKVD archives and with other documents and has established many facts pertaining to the fabrication of cases against Communists, to glaring abuses of Socialist legality which resulted in the death of innocent people. It became apparent that many party, Government and economic activists who were branded in 1937–38 as 'enemies,' were actually never enemies, spies, wreckers, etc., but were always honest Communists ... They were only so stigmatized and often, no longer able to bear barbaric tortures, they charged themselves (at the order of the investigative judges – falsifiers) with all kinds of grave and unlikely crimes.

In January 1989, the official newspaper Pravda reported that 25,000 persons had been posthumously rehabilitated.

== In literature ==
- Grieg, Nordahl. The World Must Still be Young [Ung må verden endnu være] (1938).
- Koestler, Arthur. Darkness at Noon (1940)
- Maclean, Fitzroy. Eastern Approaches (1949).
- Orwell, George. Animal Farm (1944).
- Rybakov, Anatoly. Children of the Arbat (1987); Fear (1990); Dust and Ashes (1994).
- Serge, Victor. The Case of Comrade Tulayev (1949).

== In film ==
The trials are mentioned in the 1939 film Ninotchka, where, when asked about news from Russia, the title character tells Soviet agents in Paris that "The last mass trials were a great success. There are going to be fewer but better Russians." The trials are also portrayed in the 1943 American pro-Soviet propaganda film Mission to Moscow, where the purges are shown as an attempt by Stalin to rid his country of pro-Axis "fifth columnists". Some "fifth columnists" are described in the film as acting on behalf of Germany and Japan. The film "defends the purges, complete with a quarter-hour dedicated to arguing that Leon Trotsky was a Nazi agent". In the film, former U.S. ambassador to Russia Joseph E. Davies proclaims at the end of the trial scene: "Based on twenty years' trial practice, I'd be inclined to believe these confessions."

== See also ==
- 1922 Trial of the Socialist Revolutionaries
- Vasiliy Ulrikh
- Kommunarka shooting ground
- Mass graves in the Soviet Union

== Bibliography ==
=== Primary sources ===
- "The Case of the Trotskyite-Zinovievite Terrorist Centre" (report of court proceedings). Moscow: People's Commissariat of Justice of the U.S.S.R. 1936.
- "The Case of the Anti-Soviet Trotskyite Centre." Moscow. 1937.
- "The Case of the Anti-Soviet 'Bloc of Rights and Trotskyites'." Moscow. 1938.
- Khrushchev, Nikita. 1956. "On the Cult of Personality and Its Consequences" (speech to the 20th Communist Party Congress).
- Sedov, Lev. 1938. The Red Book on the Moscow Trial: Documents. New York: New Park Publications. ISBN 0-86151-015-1

=== Secondary sources ===
- Chase, William J.; Novikova-Monterde, Olga (2026). The Many Faces of Antifascism: Interwar Marxist Militant Networks and the Divided Response to Fascism. Oxford: Oxford University Press. doi:10.1093/9780198994428.001.0001. ISBN 9780198994428.
- Chase, William J. (2024). "Wrestling With Aspects of Interwar Stalinism". In Getty, J. Arch; Siegelbaum, Lewis H. (eds.). Reflections on Stalinism. Oxford: Cornell University Press. pp. 100–115. ISBN 9781501775543.
- Chase, William J. (2001). Enemies within the gates? The Comintern and the Stalinist repression, 1934-1939. New Haven: Yale University Press. ISBN 0300082428.
- Conquest, Robert (1990). The Great Terror: A Reassessment. New York: Oxford University Press. ISBN 0-19-505580-2.
- Getty, J. Arch (1985). Origins of the Great Purges The Soviet Communist Party Reconsidered, 1933-1938. Cambridge: Cambridge University Press. ISBN 9780521335706.
- Getty, J. Arch; Naumov, Oleg V. (2010). The Road to Terror: Stalin and the Self-Destruction of the Bolsheviks, 1932-1939 (2nd ed.). New Haven: Yale University Press. ISBN 978-0300104073.
- Getty, J. Arch; Naumov, Oleg V. (2008). Yezhov: The Rise of Stalin's "Iron Fist". New Haven: Yale University Press. ISBN 978-0300092059.
- Harris, James (2015). The Great Fear: Stalin's Terror of the 1930s. Oxford: Oxford University Press. ISBN 9780198797869.
- Hessen, Robert (1990). yes (ed.). Breaking with Communism: The Intellectual Odyssey of Bertram D. Wolfe. Stanford: Hoover Institution Press. ISBN 0-8179-8881-5.
- Lenoe, Matthew E. (2010). The Kirov Murder and Soviet History. New Haven: Yale University Press. ISBN 978-0-300-11236-8.
- Redman, Joseph (March–April 1958). "The British Stalinists and the Moscow Trials". Labour Review. 3 (2).
- Rogovin, Vadim Z. (1998). 1937: Stalin's Year of Terror. Oak Park, MI: Mehring Books, Inc. ISBN 0-929087-77-1.
- Snyder, Timothy (2010). Bloodlands: Europe Between Hitler and Stalin. New York: Basic Books. ISBN 978-0-465-00239-9.
- Tucker, Robert C. (1973). Stalin as Revolutionary, 1879–1929: A Study in History and Personality. New York: Norton. ISBN 0-393-05487-X.
- Vikhnovich, Vsevolod (2012). Валентин Ольберг — Жертва Двух Мифов (Эпизод Эпохи Большого Террора) [Valentin Olberg — A Victim of Two Myths (An Episode From the Era of the Great Terror)]. 2000 лет истории евреев России [2000 Years of the History of the Jews of Russia] (in Russian). St. Petersburg. pp. 371–379. ISBN 978-5-94396-117-5.
- Whitewood, Peter (2020). "Stalin's purge of the Red Army and misperception of security threats". In Ryan, James; Grant, Susan (eds.). Revisioning Stalin and Stalinism. Oxford. pp. 39–50. doi:10.5040/9781350122994.ch-002. ISBN 9781350122994.
