= Shukman =

Shukman is a surname. Notable people with the surname include:

- David Shukman (born 1958), British journalist
- Henry Shukman (born 1962), British poet and writer
- Harold Shukman (1931–2012), British historian

== See also ==
- Shulman
