= Ivan Bakayev =

Russian Bolshevik revolutionary and Soviet politician (1887–1936)

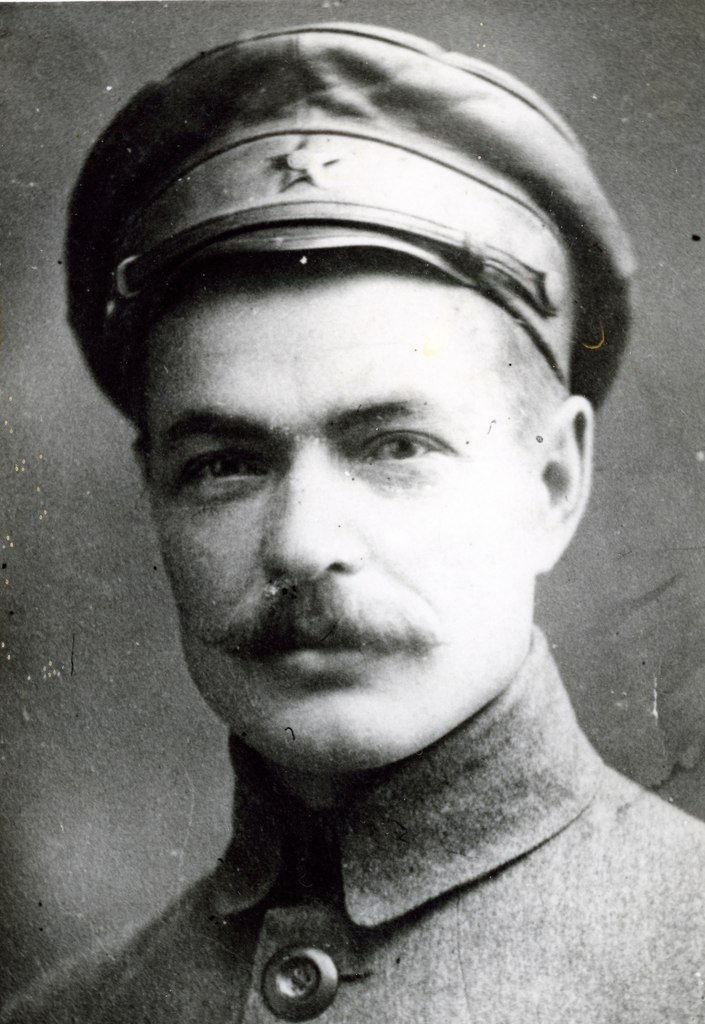
Russian communist politician, Ivan Petrovich Bakayev

Ivan Petrovich Bakayev (Russian: Ива́н Петро́вич Бака́ев; 1887 – 25 August 1936) was a Russian Bolshevik revolutionary and Soviet politician. A member of the Left Opposition, he was a defendant at the first Moscow show trial.

== Biography ==
Bakayev was born into a poor peasant family of Russian ethnicity in the Saratov Governorate of the Russian Empire. He joined the Russian Social Democratic Labour Party as an 18-year-old, during the 1905 revolution, in Kamyshin – where the local RSDLP branch had not split between Bolsheviks and Mensheviks, as it had in other cities, and where he was one of the organisers of an armed uprising. He joined the Bolsheviks in 1906, and worked for them illegally in Baku, Astrakhan, and, from 1910, in Saint Petersburg. He was arrested several times, and spent six years in prison altogether. At the time of the February Revolution, in 1917, he was working as a lathe operator in a factory in Petrograd (Saint Petersburg). During the October Revolution he was deputy secretary, and later secretary, of the Petrograd Soviet. During the Russian Civil War, he was a political commissar with the Red Army on the Ural and Petrograd fronts. In September 1919 – August 1920, he served as chairman of the Petrograd Cheka, then, after the Red Army conquest of Siberia, he headed the Cheka in the South-East territory.

== Persecution of the church ==
Bakayev returned to Petrograd in 1922 and took charge of the attempt to force the head of the Russian Orthodox Church in Petrograd, Metropolitan Benjamin to recognise the pro-Soviet "Renovationist" church. He supervised the seizure of church property and ordered the Metropolitan to rescind the excommunication of renovationist priests. When he refused, the Metropolitan was arrested, tried with ten others, and executed. (In 1992, Benjamin was declared a saint.)

== Opposition to Stalin ==
In 1924–26, Bakayev was chairman of the Communist Party Control Commission for the Leningrad province. In December 1925, when a rift arose between the Leningrad party organisation, headed by Grigory Zinoviev and supported by Lev Kamenev, and the centre, controlled by Joseph Stalin, Bakayev backed the opposition. He was expelled from the executive of the Central Control Commission on 14 November 1927, and from the Communist Party in December 1927. He then capitulated, along with Zinoviev, Kamenev and the other leaders of the Leningrad opposition, and was readmitted to the Communist Party in 1928, after which he held various economic posts.

== Arrest and execution ==
Police raided Bakayev's apartment on 9 December 1934, eight days after the assassination of the Leningrad party boss, Sergey Kirov, and seized documents, including a leaflet issued by the opposition seven years earlier, and transcripts of Politburo meetings from 1924–27. He was arrested on 15 December, with other former members of the Leningrad opposition, including his wife, Anna Kostina.

Soon afterwards, it was announced that there was not enough evidence to bring Zinoviev and others before a court, but Bakayev was reported to be under "further investigation". He was tried in secret, along with Zinoviev and others, on 16 January 1935, and sentenced to eight years in prison. According to one survivor from the Gulag, Bakayev had co-operated with the NKVD, giving evidence against the other accused, for which he was attacked by old comrades after they had been removed to prison in Chelyabinsk.

He was brought back to Moscow to be a defendant at the first Moscow show trial in August 1936, at which Bakayev "confessed" to being implicated in the Kirov murder, describing himself as "an obedient tool in the hands of Zinoviev and Kamenev (and) an agent of the counter-revolution". The prosecutor, Andrey Vyshinsky described him in court as "a man filled with malicious hatred ... with a very strong will, strong character and stamina, who would not stop at anything..." Sentenced to death on 24 August, he was shot the following day.

His widow, Anna Kostina-Bakayeva, born 1895, who worked as a turner at the Stalin automobile plant in Moscow, was arrested a second time on 9 July 1936, tried by a military court on 4 November 1936, sentenced to death, and shot the same day. She was rehabilitated in February 1959.

Along with his co-defendants, Bakayev was rehabilitated by the USSR Supreme Court on 13 July 1988.

== Personality ==
The writer Victor Serge knew Bakayev in 1919 and wrote that "Bakayev was a handsome fellow of about thirty, with the careless appearance of a Russian village accordion player; indeed he liked to wear a smock with an embroidered collar and a coloured border, just like such a player. In the performance of his frightful duty he exercised an impartial will and a scrupulous vigilance".
