= Marina Goldovskaya =

Russian documentary filmmaker (1941–2022)

Goldovskaya in 2005

Marina Yevseyevna Goldovskaya (Russian: Марина Евсеевна Голдо́вская; July 15, 1941 – March 20, 2022) was a Russian-American documentary filmmaker known for her candid portrayal of people.

== Early life and education ==
Her father worked with Eisenstein in starting the VGIK.

== Career ==
Goldovskaya documented ordinary people, seamstresses, a female astronaut, literary and artistic legends, as well as political leaders. Born in Moscow, she was the winner of USSR State Prize in 1989.

She was the first woman to graduate as a cinematographer from the VGIK. She was assistant camera on Andrei Tarkovsky's thesis film: The Steamroller and the Violin.

Goldovskaya is credited as the first woman in Russia to be the combined director, writer, cinematographer, and producer of her films.

The recipient of many documentary film and lifetime achievement awards, she served as a professor at the UCLA School of Film and Television in Los Angeles. At UCLA she was teacher, confidant, friend and mentor to many graduate film students.

A memoir by Marina Goldovskaya, A Woman with a Movie Camera, originally published in Russian, was issued in an English translation in 2006 by Texas University Press.

Goldovskaya died on March 20, 2022, in Latvia.

== Filmography ==
- Valentina Tereshkova (1972)
- This Is Our Profession (1973)
- Arkady Raikin (1975)
- Aleksandr Tvardovsky (1976)
- The Experiment (1978)
- Pouskin and Pouschin (1980)
- After the Harvest (1981)
- At Pouskin's Home (1982)
- Hello, It Is Beduliya Speaking (1985)
- Arkhangelsk Man (1986)
- Oleg Yefremov: For the Theater to Be... (1987)
- Solovki Power (1988)
- Tumbalalaika in America (1988)
- I Am 90, My Steps Are Light (1989)
- A Taste of Freedom (1991)
- More Than Love (1991)
- The Shattered Mirror (1992)
- The House on Arbat Street (1993)
- Lucky to be Born in Russia (International: English title) (1994)
- A Poet on the Lower East Side: A Docu-Diary on Allen Ginsberg (USA, 1997)
- The Children of Ivan Kuzmich (1997)
- The Prince Is Back (1999, 2004)
- Peter Sellars: Portrait (2004)
- Anatoly Rybakov: The Russian Story (International: English title) (2006)
- Anna Politkovskaya: The Bitter Taste of Freedom (2011)
- The Art of Observing Life: Conversations with Documentary Filmmakers (2014)
