= Fear (Rybakov novel) =

1990 novel by Anatoly Rybakov

- First edition (Russian)
- Author: Anatoly Rybakov
- Original title: Страх
- Language: Russian
- Series: Children of the Arbat
- Publisher: Little, Brown & Company
- Publication date: 1990
- Publication place: Soviet Union
- English publication date: 1992
- Preceded by: Children of the Arbat
- Followed by: Dust and Ashes

Fear (Russian: Страх) is a novel by Anatoly Rybakov that recounts the era in the Soviet Union of the build-up to the 'Congress of the Victors', the early years of the second Five Year Plan and the (supposed) circumstances of the murder of Sergey Kirov prior to the beginning of the Great Purge. It is the second book of the trilogy, preceded by Children of the Arbat and followed by Dust and Ashes.
