= Baranów, Lublin Voivodeship =

Baranów
- Village
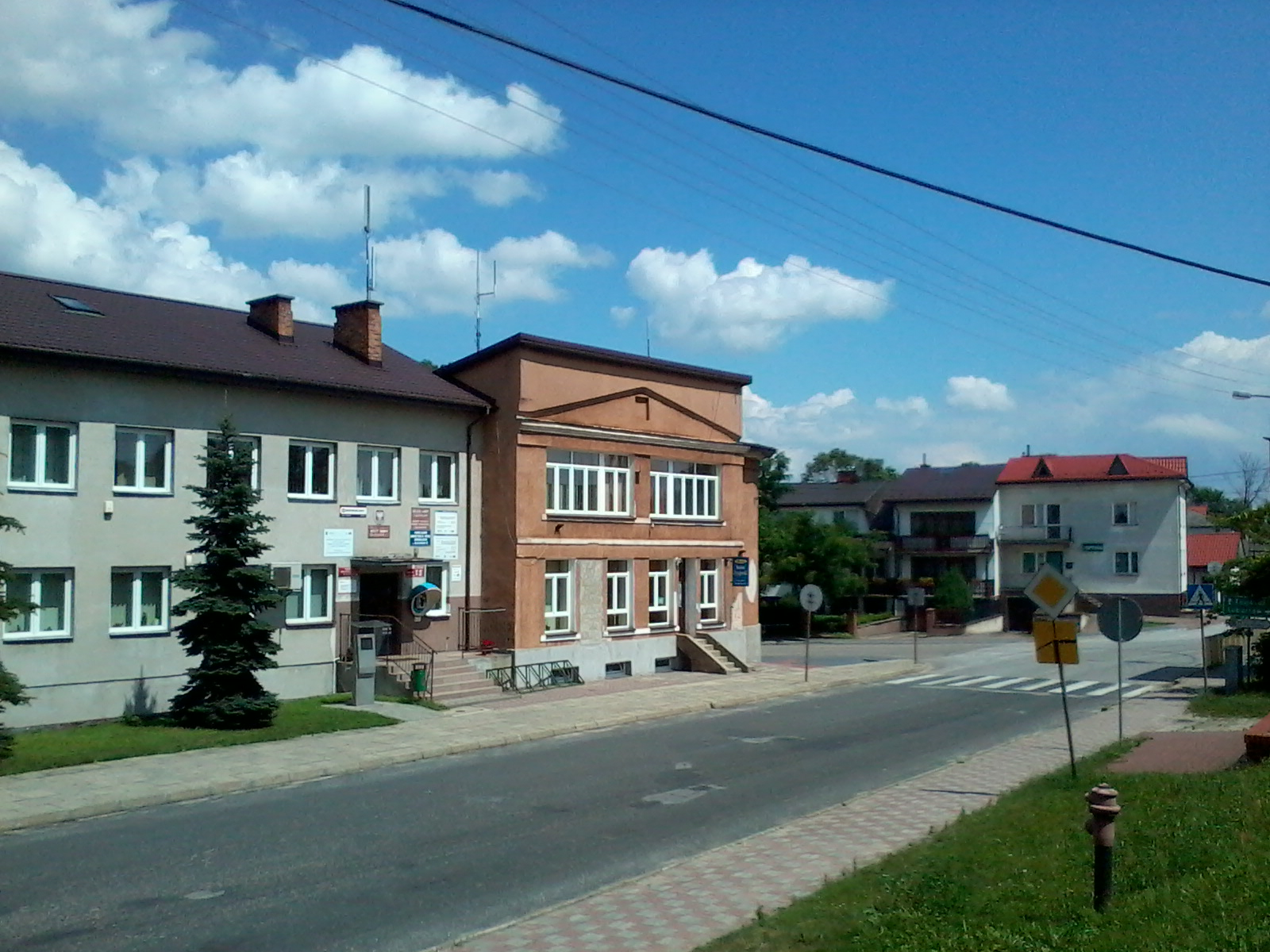

- Location within Poland
- Coordinates: 51°33′26″N 22°8′8″E
- Country: Poland
- Voivodeship: Lublin
- County: Puławy
- Gmina: Baranów
- Elevation: 150 m (490 ft)

Population
  - Total: 1,672
- Time zone: UTC+1 (CET)
  - Summer (DST): UTC+2 (CEST)
- Website: Official website

Baranów [baˈranuf] is a village in Puławy County, Lublin Voivodeship, in eastern Poland. It is the seat of the gmina (administrative district) called Gmina Baranów.

== History ==
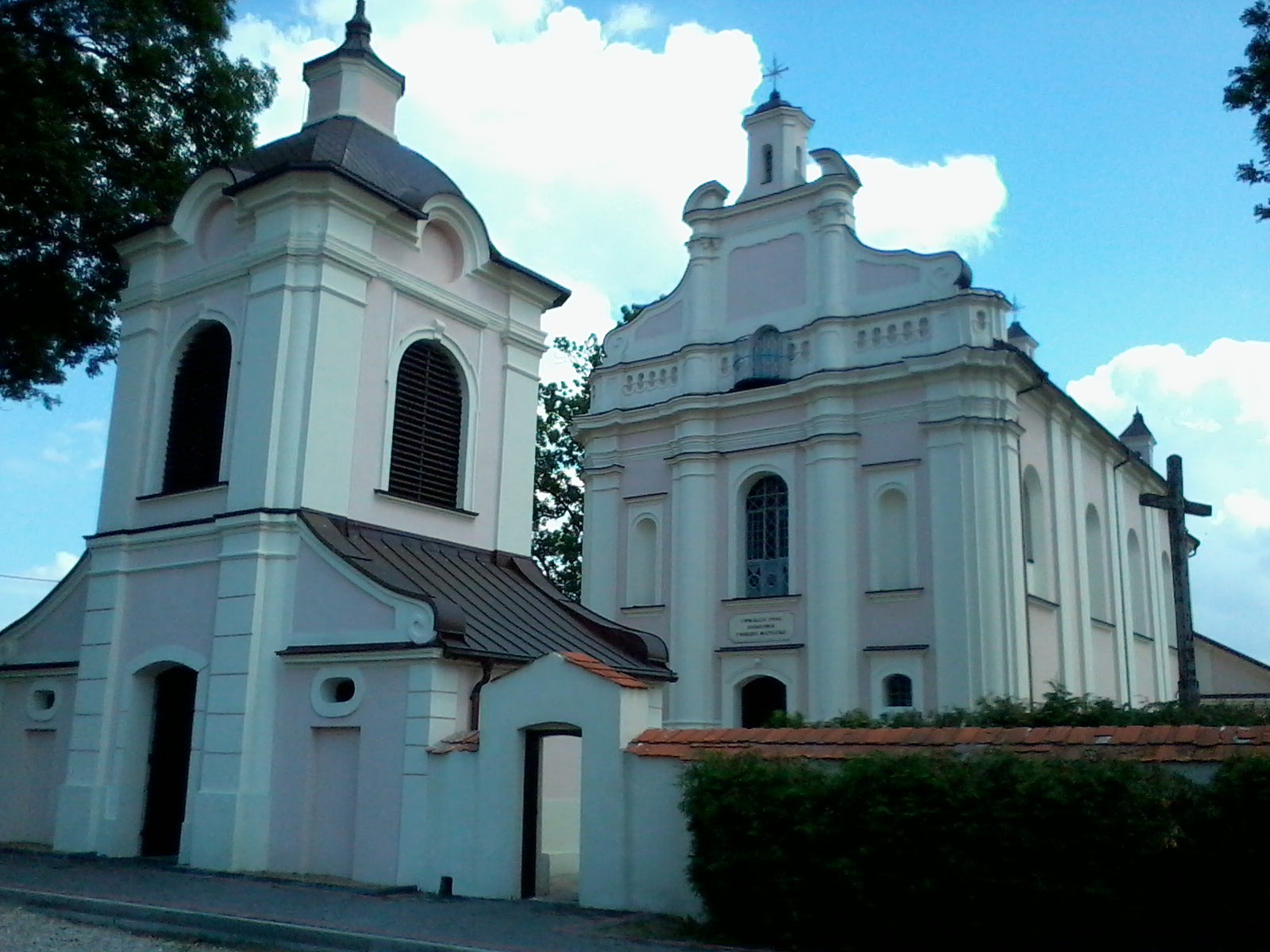
Baroque Saint John the Baptist church

Baranów was founded as a town on the basis of Magdeburg Law in 1544. It was administratively located in the Lublin Voivodeship in the Lesser Poland Province of the Kingdom of Poland. It was the ancestral seat of the Baranowski noble family. Until the early 17th century, it had a printing house and a Calvinist parish.

The town was annexed by Austria in the Third Partition of Poland in 1795. After the Polish victory in the Austro-Polish War of 1809, it became part of the short-lived Duchy of Warsaw, and after the duchy's dissolution in 1815, it fell to the Russian Partition of Poland. By the 19th century the town was in economic decline and in 1870 it lost its town status.

=== History of Jews in Baranów ===
The first historical mention of the Jewish inhabitants of Baranów comes from records dating from 1621 during the Polish–Lithuanian Commonwealth. The town saw an influx of Jews as a result of Russian discriminatory policies, when it was located within the Pale of Settlement in the Russian Partition of Poland. In 1858, the town had a population of 1,790, including 950 Jews. In 1930 the village had a population of 2071, including 1092 Jews.

In World War II, the Germans occupied Baranów in September 1939 and immediately took both Christians and Jews as hostages. They were later released. Afterwards, Germans began robbing and plundering Jewish homes and shops. The Blue Police participated in the robberies but Polish authorities often mitigated the impact of the anti Jewish policies of the Germans. A Nazi ghetto was established in late 1941, containing both local Jews and hundreds of Jewish refugees who had fled to Baranów. Many healthy Jews were sent to Nazi concentration camps called Arbeitslager (labor camps) nearby, leaving behind the elderly and sick in the ghetto who often died of malnutrition and starvation. In May 1942, the German SS with their Ukrainian auxiliary troops came to town to round up the Jewish community to be deported to the Sobibor extermination camp. About 500 were deported that day. At least 100 Jews fled to the forests or hid with Polish acquaintances. Some were murdered by anti-semitic Polish partisans in the forests, others fled to other ghettos. Most of those hiding in the forest were killed later by German SS, Ukrainian auxiliaries, and Blue Police in 1943 and 1944. Fewer than 25 Baranów Jews survived the war, and the Jewish community was not reestablished in the village afterwards. Except for the remnants of the Jewish cemetery and the name of one of the streets, few traces of the former Jewish presence remain in the village today.

The town is the ancestral home of the historian Harold Shukman and his sons, the science journalist David Shukman and the travel writer and novelist Henry Shukman. Harold Shukman's father, David Shukman, whose first name he gave to his first born son, was part of the Jewish community of Baranow during the Russian Empire, before emigrating and settling in the United Kingdom.
