= Presumption of guilt =

Presumption that a person is guilty of a crime

Presumption of guilt within the criminal justice system refers to presumption that a suspect is guilty unless or until proven to be innocent, as opposed to the legal principle of presumption of innocence, which states that every person accused of any crime is considered innocent until proven guilty. Such a presumption may legitimately arise from a rule of law or a procedural rule of the court or other adjudicating body which determines how the facts in the case are to be proved, and may be either rebuttable or irrebuttable. An irrebuttable presumption of fact may not be challenged by the defense, and the presumed fact is taken as having been proved. A rebuttable presumption shifts the burden of proof onto the defense, who must collect and present evidence to prove the suspect's innocence, in order to obtain acquittal.

Rebuttable presumptions of fact, arising during the course of a trial as a result of specific factual situations (for example that the accused has taken flight), are common; an opening presumption of guilt based on the mere fact that the suspect has been charged is considered illegitimate in many countries, and contrary to international human rights standards. In the United States, an irrebuttable presumption of guilt is considered to be unconstitutional. Informal and legally illegitimate presumptions of guilt may also arise from the attitudes or prejudices of those such as judges, lawyers or police officers who administer the system. Such presumptions may result in suspects who are innocent being brought before a court to face criminal charges, with a risk of improperly being found guilty.

== Definition ==
According to Herbert L. Packer, "It would be a mistake to think of the presumption of guilt as the opposite of the presumption of innocence that we are so used to thinking of as the polestar of the criminal process and which [...] occupies an important position in the due process model." The presumption of guilt prioritizes speed and efficiency over reliability, and prevails when due process is absent.

In State v. Brady (1902) 91 NW 801, Weaver J said "'Presumptions of guilt' and 'prima facie' cases of guilt in the trial of a party charged with crime mean no more than that from the proof of certain facts the jury will be warranted in convicting the accused of the offense with which he is charged".

== Human rights ==
In Director of Public Prosecutions v. Labavarde and Anor, Neerunjun C.J. said that article 11(1) of the Universal Declaration of Human Rights and article 6(2) of the Convention for the Protection of Human Rights and Fundamental Freedoms would be infringed if "the whole burden is ... cast on the defence by the creation of a presumption of guilt on the mere preferment of the criminal charge".

== Inquisitorial systems ==
It is sometimes said that in inquisitorial systems, a defendant is guilty until proven innocent. It has also been said that this is a myth, as well as a former "common conceit of English lawyers" who asserted this was the case in France.

A presumption of guilt is incompatible with the presumption of innocence and moves an accusatorial system of justice toward the inquisitional.

== Common law presumptions ==
There have existed at least two types of presumption of guilt under the law of England, which arose from a rule of law or a procedural rule of the court or other adjudicating body and determined how the facts in the case were to be proven, and could be either rebuttable or irrebuttable. Those were:

- Presumption of guilt arising from the conduct of the party charged
- Presumption of guilt arising from the possession of provable stolen property

== Consequences ==
Plea bargaining has been said to involve a presumption of guilt. The American Bar Association states that people with limited resources accused of a crime "find themselves trapped by a system that presumes their guilt."

Presumption of guilt on the part of investigators may result in false confessions. The circumstances of the trial of Steven Avery for the murder of Teresa Halbach were publicized in media at the time, and were later the subject of the American documentary television series Making a Murderer. The media publications largely concerned the postulation that such a presumption of guilt had resulted in the wrongful conviction, by means of an induced false confession, of Avery's nephew, Brendan Dassey.

Preventive detention, detaining an individual for a crime they may commit, has been said to involve a presumption of guilt, or something very close to one.

A fixed penalty notice or on-the-spot fine are penalties issued by police for minor offences which are difficult and expensive to appeal.

== Unconstitutional, illegitimate and informal presumptions ==
An irrebuttable presumption of guilt is unconstitutional in the United States. An arrest, however, often becomes synonymous or "fused" with guilt, postulates Anna Roberts, a United States law professor. In the minds of jurors, the person charged must have done something wrong.

High Court judge Sir Richard Henriques has criticized UK police training and methods which allegedly assert that "only 0.1% of rape allegations are false", and in which all complainants are treated as "victims" from the start. It is difficult to assess the true prevalence of false rape allegations, but it is generally agreed that rape accusations are false at least 2% to 10% of the time, with a greater proportion of cases not being proven to be true or false.

The American actor and producer Jeremy Piven has spoken out against the Me Too movement, which he claims "put lives in jeopardy without a hearing, due process or evidence". Writing about Piven's comment, journalist Brendan O'Neill, suggests that the presumption of innocence is being weakened.

An illegitimate presumption of guilt may be caused or motivated by factors such as racial prejudice, "media frenzy", cognitive bias, and others.

=== Cases in Japan ===
In Japan the criminal justice system has been criticized for its wide use of detentions during which suspects are forced to make false confessions during interrogations. In 2020, Japan's Justice Minister Masako Mori tweeted regarding the need for someone to prove their innocence in a court of law. She later deleted the tweet and called it a "verbal gaffe".

=== Cases in South Korea ===
In South Korea, the constitution clearly states the principle of presumption of innocence in criminal investigations. However, there is much criticism in South Korea that the principle of presumption of innocence is not properly observed or practiced in the investigation of sexual crimes.

According to The Herald Business, South Korean police and prosecutors are known to be reluctant to investigate false accusations of sexual crimes, even when there are suspicions of false accusations. This is because most accusers are women, and they want to avoid blaming that "the investigative agency is causing secondary harm to the victims". South Korean police and prosecutors say, "We cannot even properly question the accusers suspected of false accusation". The reason for this is that in April 2018, the Supreme Court of Korea ruled to apply "gender sensitivity"(성인지 감수성, Seong'inji gamsuseong) to the judiciary's decisions. The Supreme Court even ruled that the credibility of a victim's testimony should not be easily doubted, even if the statements change over time. As a result, courts began to prioritise the testimony of the "victim", leading to criticism that the principle of presumption of innocence has been undermined. However, according to the ruling of the Supreme Court of Korea in January 2024, "It doesn't mean that the probative value of the statement of a sexual crime victim should be recognised without limitation or that the fact of the construction should be unconditionally judged guilty based on it". Although it does not mean that "gender sensitivity" has been abolished, it is a re-declaration of the legal principle that the principle of presumption of innocence should also be considered. Accordingly, the problem of presumption of guilt is partially resolved.

== See also ==
- Blackstone's ratio
- False accusation
- Give me the man and I will give you the case against him
- Kangaroo court
- Prosecutor's fallacy
- Understanding
