= Konon Berman-Yurin =

Latvian Communist

- Born: 1901; Courland, Governorate of Livonia, Russian Empire
- Died: 25 August 1936 (aged 34–35); Moscow, Soviet Union
- Cause of death: Execution
- Other names: Hans Stauer; Alexander Fomich
- Known for: Defendant of the Trial of the Sixteen
- Political party: Communist Party of Latvia; German Communist Party

Konon Borisovich Berman-Yurin (aka Hans Stauer, Alexander Fomich) (1901 – 25 August 1936) was a Latvian Communist who was a state witness in the trial of Grigory Zinoviev.

== Background ==
Berman-Yurin was born in Courland, Latvia. He was a member of the Communist Party of Latvia from 1921 to 1924.

In 1923, he left Latvia for Germany without obtaining the permission of the party, who expelled him as a deserter. However he did join the German Communist Party, where he joined the regional directorate involved in propaganda and organisational work. Following the Nazi seizure of power in Germany, Berman-Yurin fled to the USSR getting a job for the Moscow newspaper Za industrializatsiiu. He was arrested on 22 May 1936 and was one of the accused in the Trial of the Sixteen, one of the Moscow show trials. He implicated himself in a "confession" claiming that he had met with Leon Trotsky in Copenhagen in 1932 where they planned to assassinate Joseph Stalin. He claimed that Trotsky had instructed him that "if possible, the terroristic act must be carried out at a Plenum or Congress of the Comintern, so that the shot at Stalin should ring out in a large assembly. This would have a tremendous repercussion far beyond the borders of the Soviet Union and call forth a mass movement throughout the world. This would have a world-historical political significance".

After being convicted and sentenced to death, Berman-Yurin was shot on 25 August 1936.
