= Give me the man and I will give you the case against him =

Soviet-era saying

"Give me the man and I will give you the case against him" (Polish: Dajcie mi człowieka, a paragraf się znajdzie; translated to English more literally as "give me the man; there'll be a paragraph (Note: The paragraph here refers to a particular part, demarked by the section sign of a legal text (statute or article), called a paragraph in Polish. This is why the title of the famous book Catch-22 was translated to Polish as Paragraf 22.) for him", Russian: Был бы человек, а статья найдется ("If there is a person, there will be an article [in the criminal code]"), also interpreted as "give me the man, and I will find the crime", or "show me the man and I'll show you the crime") is a saying that was popularized in the Soviet Union and in Poland in the period of the People's Republic of Poland, attributed to the Stalinist jurist Andrey Vyshinsky, or the Soviet secret police chief Lavrentiy Beria. It refers to the miscarriage of justice in the form of the abuse of power by the jurists, who could find any defendant guilty of "something", if they so desired.

== Origin ==
The saying is commonly attributed to the Stalinist jurist Andrey Vyshinsky, the Soviet secret police chief Lavrentiy Beria, or to Stalin himself. There are no documentary evidence for Beria's or Stalin's attribution, however there are some memoirs that Vyshinsky uttered this phrase. At the same time there is a stenographic record dated by June 14, 1940, of Vyacheslav Molotov talking to Juozas Urbšys where he said something similar: "...first of all they must be arrested and brought before the court, and the [criminal code] articles will be found" ("...прежде всего нужно их арестовать и отдать под суд, а статьи найдутся.").

Jarosław Grzegorz Pacuła briefly discussed the saying's origins, pointing to older similar sayings in English, such as 18th-century Scottish jurist Lord Braxfield's "Let them bring me prisoners, and I will find them law" and the Russian proverb "If there is a neck, there is a collar" (Была бы шея, а хомут найдётся; or Была бы голова, а петля найдется) that Vyshinsky might have known and paraphrased. Another similar Russian proverb is "была бы спина, найдется и вина", "if there was a back [to flog], there would be guilt". A similar quote has also been attributed to 17th-century French statesman Cardinal Richelieu ("Give me six lines written by the hand of the most honest man, I will find something in them which will hang him"). A related American saying is "A prosecutor can indict a ham sandwich". Polish writer Henryk Pająk summarized the saying in four words: "person exists, [their] crime exists" ("jest czlowiek, jest przestępstwo").

== Meaning ==
The expression means there are ways to convict any person regardless of their position in society and regardless of wherever the person actually committed a crime.

In Poland the saying is associated with the criticism of the justice system under totalitarian (in particular, communist) regimes. The saying has been described as "one of the most popular, depressing and representative sayings about the general powerlessness of people faced with injust legal systems, characteristic to all countries governed by the communists".

Such abuse of power, exemplified by this saying, has been explicitly discussed in the context of military justice in the Stalinist era in Poland (1948–1956), particularly with regard to the court's ability to determine the legal classifications of the defendant's actions, based on very vague and generic legal terminology. During that time, in several cases, the courts considered multiple competing classifications and often sided with the prosecution in defaulting to the one which would invoke the harshest punishments.

The expression is also used modern Russia to describe fabrication of criminal cases by police and judges.

== See also ==
- Kangaroo court
- Show trial
- Presumption of guilt
- Fishing expedition
