= Dust and Ashes =

1994 novel by Anatoly Rybakov

- Author: Anatoly Rybakov
- Original title: Прах и пепел
- Language: Russian
- Series: Children of the Arbat
- Publisher: Little, Brown & Company
- Publication date: 1994
- Publication place: Soviet Union, Russia
- English publication date: 1996
- Preceded by: Fear

Dust and Ashes (Russian: Прах и пепел) is a novel by Anatoly Rybakov that recounts the era in the Soviet Union of the build-up to the 'Congress of the Victors' (26 January – 10 February 1934), the early years of the second Five Year Plan and the (supposed) circumstances of the murder of Sergey Kirov prior to the beginning of the Great Purge, the years from 1936 to 1938. It is the third book of the trilogy, preceded by Children of the Arbat and Fear.
