= Andrey Vyshinsky =

Soviet politician, jurist, and diplomat (1883–1954)

- Андрей Вышинский
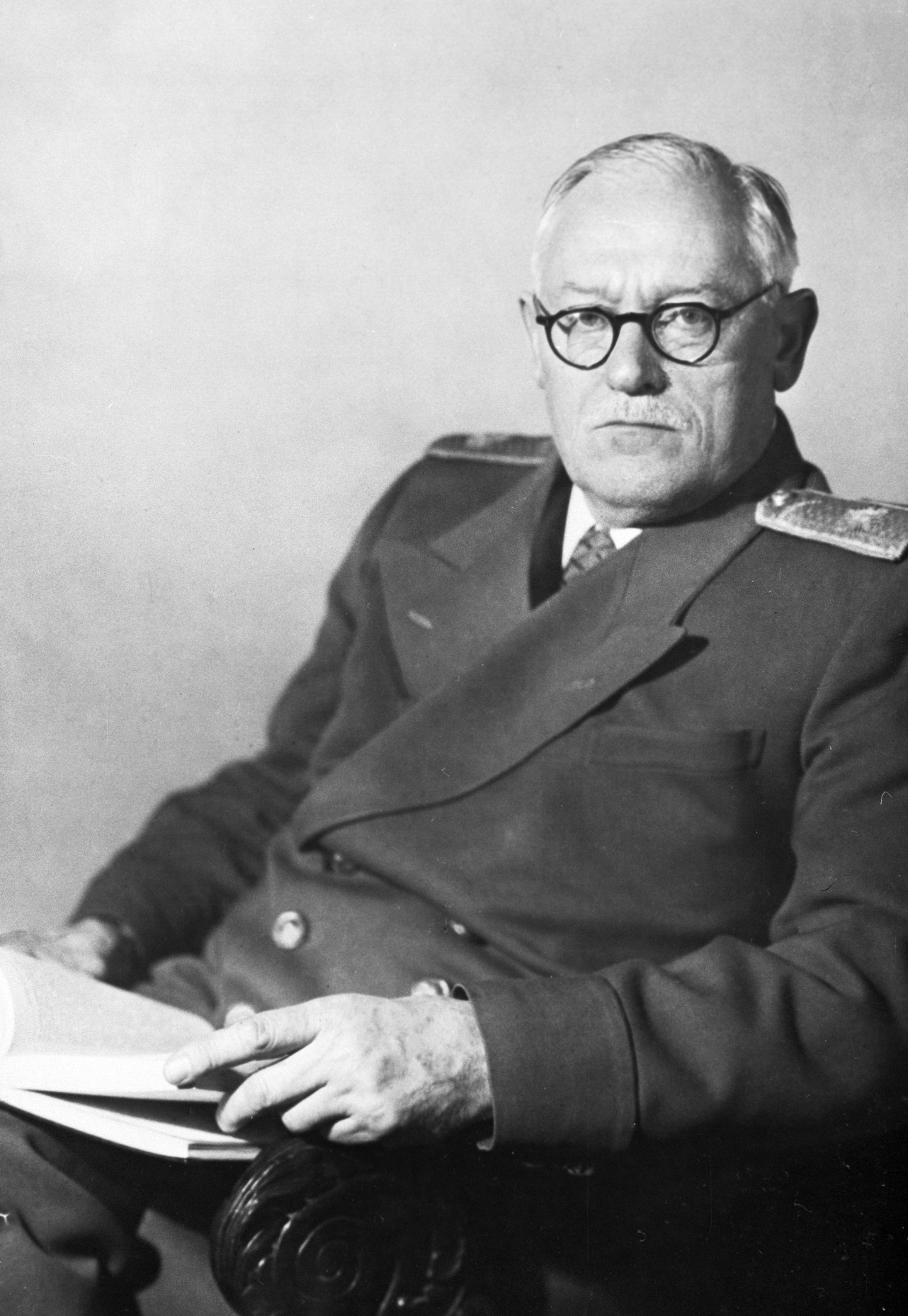
- Vyshinsky in 1950

Permanent Representative of the Soviet Union to the United Nations
- In office 5 March 1953 – 22 November 1954
- Premier: Georgy Malenkov
- Preceded by: Valerian Zorin
- Succeeded by: Arkady Sobolev

Candidate member of the 19th Presidium
- In office 16 October 1952 – 5 March 1953
- Premier: Joseph Stalin

Minister of Foreign Affairs
- In office 4 March 1949 – 5 March 1953
- Premier: Joseph Stalin
- Preceded by: Vyacheslav Molotov
- Succeeded by: Vyacheslav Molotov

Deputy Premier of the Soviet Union
- In office 31 May 1939 – 15 May 1944
- Premier: Vyacheslav Molotov; Joseph Stalin

Procurator General of the Soviet Union
- In office 3 March 1935 – 31 May 1939
- Premier: Vyacheslav Molotov
- Preceded by: Ivan Akulov
- Succeeded by: Mikhail Pankratyev

Procurator General of the Russian SFSR
- In office 11 May 1931 – 25 May 1934
- Premier: Vyacheslav Molotov
- Preceded by: Nikolai Krylenko
- Succeeded by: Vladimir Antonov-Ovseyenko

Personal details
- Born: Andrey Yanuaryevich Vyshinsky; 10 December 1883 Odessa, Kherson Governorate, Russian Empire
- Died: 22 November 1954 (aged 70) New York City, U.S.
- Resting place: Kremlin Wall Necropolis, Moscow
- Party: Communist Party of the Soviet Union (1920–1954)
- Other political affiliations: RSDLP (Mensheviks) (1903–1920)
- Profession: Jurist, diplomat, civil servant
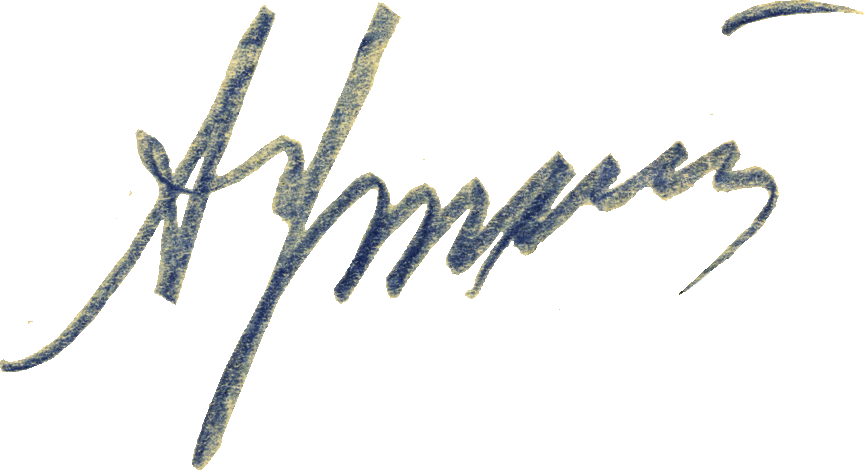
- Signature

Andrey Yanuaryevich Vyshinsky (Russian: Андре́й Януа́рьевич Выши́нский; Polish: Andrzej Wyszyński) (10 December [O.S. 28 November] 1883 – 22 November 1954) was a Soviet politician, jurist and diplomat. He is best known as a state prosecutor of Joseph Stalin's Moscow Trials and in the Nuremberg trials. He was the Soviet Foreign Minister from 1949 to 1953, after having served as Deputy Foreign Minister under Vyacheslav Molotov since 1940. He also headed the Institute of State and Law in the Academy of Sciences of the Soviet Union.

== Biography ==
=== Early life ===
Vyshinsky was born in Odessa into a Polish Catholic family, which later moved to Baku. Early biographies portray his father, Yanuary Vyshinsky (Januarius Wyszyński), as a "well-prospering" "experienced inspector" (Russian: Ревизор); while later, undocumented, Stalin-era biographies such as that in the Great Soviet Encyclopedia make him a pharmaceutical chemist. A talented student, Andrei Vyshinsky married Kara Mikhailova and became interested in revolutionary ideas. He began attending the Kiev University in 1901, but was expelled in 1902 for participating in revolutionary activities.

Vyshinsky returned to Baku, became a member of the Menshevik faction of the Russian Social Democratic Labour Party in 1903, and took an active part in the 1905 Russian Revolution. As a result, he was sentenced to prison in 1908 and a few days later was sent to Bayil prison in Baku to serve his sentence. Here he first met Stalin, a fellow-inmate with whom he engaged in ideological disputes. After his release, he returned home to Baku for the birth of his daughter Zinaida in 1909. Soon thereafter, he returned to Kiev University and did quite well, graduating in 1913. He was even considered for a professorship but his political past caught up with him, and he was forced to return to Baku. Determined to practise law, he tried Moscow, where he became a successful lawyer, remained an active Menshevik, gave many passionate and incendiary speeches, and became involved in city government.

=== Russian Revolution and Civil War ===
After the February Revolution in 1917, Vyshinsky was appointed police commissioner of the Yakimanka District. As a minor official, he undersigned an order to arrest Vladimir Lenin on charges of being a "German spy", according to the decision of the Minister of Justice of the Russian Provisional Government, but the October Revolution quickly intervened, and the offices which had ordered the arrest were dissolved. In 1917, he became reacquainted with Stalin, who had become an important Bolshevik leader. Consequently, he joined the staff of the People's Commissariat of Food, which was responsible for Moscow's food supplies, and with the help of Stalin, Alexei Rykov, and Lev Kamenev, he began to rise in influence and prestige. In 1920, after the defeat of the Whites under Denikin, and the end of the Russian Civil War, he joined the Bolsheviks.

=== Bolsheviks in power ===
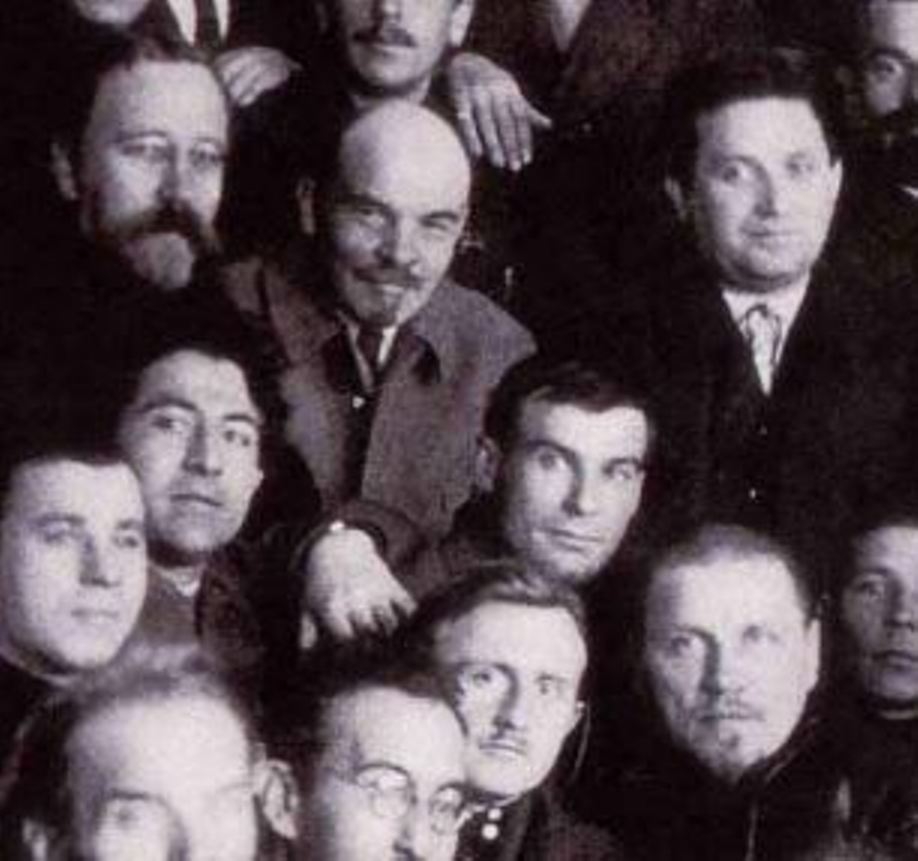
Vyshinsky (bottom, right of Vladmir Lenin, with buttoned shirt), 1922. Lev Kamenev, Lenin, and Grigory Zinoviev, at a congress of the All-Russian Central Executive Committee. 14 years later, he became the chief prosecutor at the Moscow Trials, where Zinoviev and Kamenev were sentenced to death.

Becoming a member of the nomenklatura, Vyshinsky became a prosecutor in the new Soviet legal system, began a rivalry with a fellow lawyer, Nikolai Krylenko, and in 1925 was elected rector of Moscow University, which he began to clear of "unsuitable" students and professors.

In 1928, Vyshinsky presided over the Shakhty Trial against 53 alleged counter-revolutionary "wreckers". Krylenko acted as prosecutor, and the outcome was never in doubt. As historian Arkady Vaksberg explains, "all the court's attention was concentrated not on analyzing the evidence, which simply did not exist, but on securing from the accused confirmation of their confessions of guilt that were contained in the records of the preliminary investigation."

In November–December 1930, Vyshinsky presided as judge over the Industrial Party Trial, with Krylenko as prosecutor, which was accompanied by a storm of international protest. In this case, all eight defendants confessed their guilt. As a result, he was promoted. In April 1933, he was prosecutor in the Metro-Vickers trial, at which eight out of 18 defendants were British engineers, and which resulted in relatively light sentences. He carried out administrative preparations for a "systematic" drive "against harvest-wreckers and grain-thieves".

=== Procurator General and Soviet law theorist ===
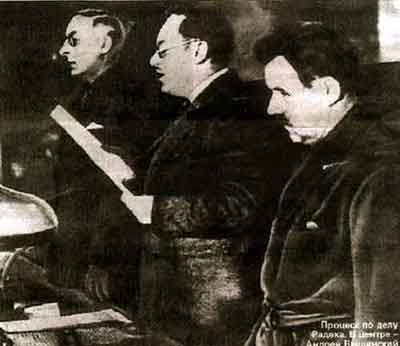
Prosecutor General Vyshinsky (centre), reading the 1937 indictment against Karl Radek during the second Moscow Trial

Vyshinsky was appointed First Deputy Procurator General of the Soviet Union when the office was first created on 30 June 1933. At this time, he outranked Krylenko but was nominally junior to Ivan Akulov.

In January 1935, he prosecuted Grigory Zinoviev and 18 other former supporters of the Left Opposition, who were accused of 'moral responsibility' for the assassination of Sergei Kirov. In June 1935, Vyshinsky replaced Akulov, who had allegedly questioned the decision to link Zinoviev and others to the Kirov murder, and from thereon he was the legal mastermind of Joseph Stalin's Great Purge. Although he acted as a judge, he encouraged investigators to procure confessions from the accused. In some cases, he prepared the indictments before the "investigation" was concluded. In his Theory of Judicial Proofs in Soviet Justice (Stalin Prize in 1947) he laid a theoretical base for the Soviet judicial system. He also used his own speeches from the Moscow Trials as an example of how defendants' statements could be used as primary evidence. Vyshinsky is cited for the principle that "confession of the accused is the queen of evidence".

Vyshinsky first became a nationally known public figure as a result of the Semenchuk case of 1936. Konstantin Semenchuk was the head of the Glavsevmorput station on Wrangel Island. He was accused of oppressing and starving the local Yupik and of ordering his subordinate, the sledge driver Stepan Startsev, to murder Dr. Nikolai Vulfson, who had attempted to stand up to Semenchuk, on 27 December 1934 (though there were also rumors that Startsev had fallen in love with Vulfson's wife, Dr. Gita Feldman, and killed him out of jealousy). The case came to trial before the Supreme Court of the RSFSR in May 1936; both defendants, attacked by Vyshinsky as "human waste", were found guilty and shot, and "the most publicised result of the trial was the joy of the liberated Eskimos."

In 1936, Vyshinsky achieved international infamy as the prosecutor at the Zinoviev-Kamenev trial (this trial had nine other defendants), the first of the Moscow Trials during the Great Purge, lashing its defenseless victims with vituperative rhetoric:

Shoot these rabid dogs. Death to this gang who hide their ferocious teeth, their eagle claws, from the people! Down with that vulture Trotsky, from whose mouth a bloody venom drips, putrefying the great ideals of Marxism! ... Down with these abject animals! Let's put an end once and for all to these miserable hybrids of foxes and pigs, these stinking corpses! Let's exterminate the mad dogs of capitalism, who want to tear to pieces the flower of our new Soviet nation! Let's push the bestial hatred they bear our leaders back down their own throats!

Vyshinsky often punctuated speeches with phrases like "Dogs of the Fascist bourgeoisie", "mad dogs of Trotskyism", "dregs of society", "decayed people", "terrorist thugs and degenerates", and "accursed vermin". This dehumanization aided in what historian Arkady Vaksberg calls "a hitherto unknown type of trial where there was not the slightest need for evidence: what evidence did you need when you were dealing with 'stinking carrion' and 'mad dogs'?" He is also attributed by some as the author of an infamous quote from the Stalin era: "Give me a man and I will find the crime."

Nevertheless, according to Robert W. Thurston, in February 1936, Vyshinsky wrote to Molotov calling for a reduction of NKVD power, critiquing the organ's power to summarily arrest or exile people or sentence them to prison.

During the trials, Vyshinsky misappropriated the house and money of Leonid Serebryakov (one of the defendants of the infamous Moscow Trials), who was later executed. In April 1937, Vyshinsky denounced Yevgeny Pashukanis, the Soviet Union's foremost legal scholar and former Deputy People's Commissar for Justice as a 'wrecker'. This was the start of a purge of prosecutor's apparatus, carried out by Vyshinsky, which saw 90 per cent of provincial prosecutors removed, and many of them arrested. Pashukanis was executed later that year.

During the Great Purge, Vyshinsky was approached in his office by Mikhail Ishov, a military procurator based in West Siberia, who had been trying to stop the arrests of innocent people in that territory. Vyshinsky told him: "You have lost your sense of party and class. We don't intend to pat enemies on the head. ... If the enemy doesn't surrender, he must be destroyed." After the meeting, he reported Ishov, who was arrested and sentenced to five years in labour camps.

In May 1939, Vyshinsky was promoted to the rank of Deputy Chairman of the Council of People's Commissars Ministers (ie deputy prime minister) of the Soviet Union. His sphere of responsibilities included education and culture, as these areas were incorporated more fully into the USSR, he directed efforts to convert the written alphabets of conquered peoples to the Cyrillic alphabet, as well as the law. In June 1939, he presided over the All-Union Conference of Stage Directors. The fourth speaker in the main debate, on 15 June, was Vsevolod Meyerhold, the Soviet Union's most renowned living stage director. His speech was not reported in the Soviet press, except to say that it was severely criticised. Meyerhold was arrested five days later, tortured, and shot.

Roland Freisler, a German Nazi judge, who served as the State Secretary of the Reich Ministry of Justice, studied and had attended the trials by Vyshinsky's in 1938 to use a similar approach in show trials conducted by Nazi Germany.

=== Wartime diplomat ===
In June 1937, Vyshinsky took part in negotiations with the US Ambassador in Moscow, Joseph E. Davies, over trade debts, and after the completion of the last of the major show trials, in March 1938, he entered another phase in his career, devoted primarily to foreign affairs. Vyshinsky had a low opinion of diplomats because they often complained about the effect of trials on opinions in the West. The Great Purge inflicted tremendous losses on the People's Commissariat of Foreign Affairs. Maxim Litvinov was one of the few diplomats who survived and he was dismissed in 1939, and replaced by Vyacheslav Molotov. In 1939, Vyshinsky introduced a motion to the Supreme Soviet to bring Western Ukraine into the USSR. In June to August 1940 he was sent to Latvia to supervise the establishment of a pro-Soviet government and incorporation of that country into the USSR. He was generally well received, and he set out to purge the Latvian Communist Party of Trotskyists, Bukharinites, and possible foreign agents. In July 1940, a Latvian Soviet Republic was proclaimed. It was, unsurprisingly, granted admission to the USSR.

As a result of this success, on 6 September 1940, Vyshinsky was named First Deputy People's Commissar of Foreign Affairs, and taken into greater confidence by Stalin, Lavrentiy Beria, and Vyacheslav Molotov. His main responsibility was Eastern Europe, though he was the official that Stafford Cripps dealt with during his period as British Ambassador, and the one to whom Cripps passed on Winston Churchill's warning that Germany might be intending to invade the USSR, which Vyshinsky refused to discuss.

After the German invasion of the Soviet Union Vyshinsky was transferred to the shadow capital at Kuibyshev. He remained here for much of the war, but he continued to act as a loyal functionary, and attempted to ingratiate himself with Archibald Clark Kerr and visiting Republican presidential candidate Wendell Willkie. During the Tehran Conference in 1943, he remained in the Soviet Union to "keep shop" while most of the leadership was abroad. Stalin appointed him to the Allied Control Council on Italian affairs where he began organizing the repatriation of Soviet POWs (including those who did not want to return to the Soviet Union). He also began to liaise with the Italian Communist Party in Naples.

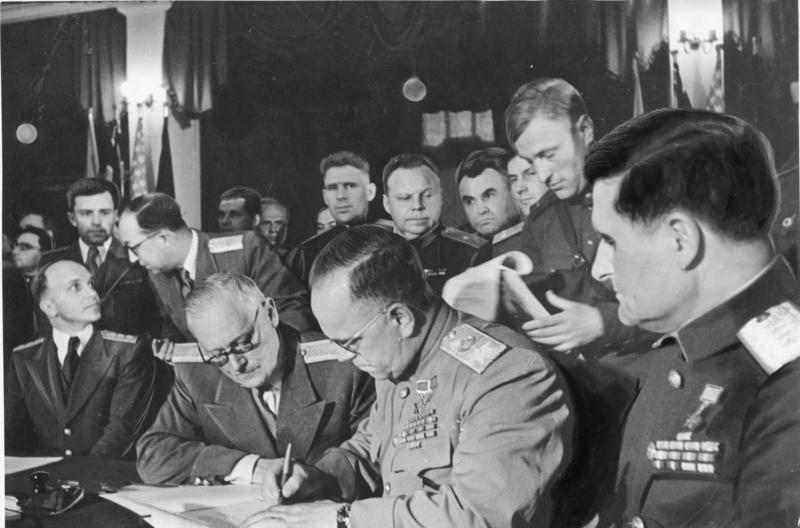
The unconditional surrender of the German Wehrmacht is signed on 8 May 1945 in Karlshorst by Marshal Zhukov, General Sokolovsky and Vyshinsky.

In February 1945, he accompanied Stalin, Molotov, and Beria to the Yalta Conference. After returning to Moscow he was dispatched to Romania, where he arranged for a communist regime to assume control in 1945. He then once again accompanied the Soviet leadership to the Potsdam Conference. On 26 February 1946, he rushed to Bucharest to force King Michael of Romania, whose palace was surrounded by Soviet tanks, to dismiss the anti-communist head of government, General Nicolae Rădescu and appoint the pro-communist Petru Groza.

British diplomat Sir Frank Roberts, who served as British chargé d'affaires in Moscow from February 1945 to October 1947, described him as follows:

He spoke good French, was quick, clever and efficient, and always knew his dossier well, but whereas I had a certain unwilling respect for Molotov, I had none at all for Vyshinsky. All Soviet officials at that time had no choice but to carry out Stalin's policies without asking too many questions, but Vyshinsky above all gave me the impression of a cringing toadie only too anxious to obey His Master's Voice even before it had expressed his wishes. ... I always had the feeling with Vyshinsky that his past as a Menshevik together with his Polish and bourgeois background made him particularly servile and obsequious in his dealings with Stalin and to a lesser extent with Molotov.

=== Post-Second World War ===
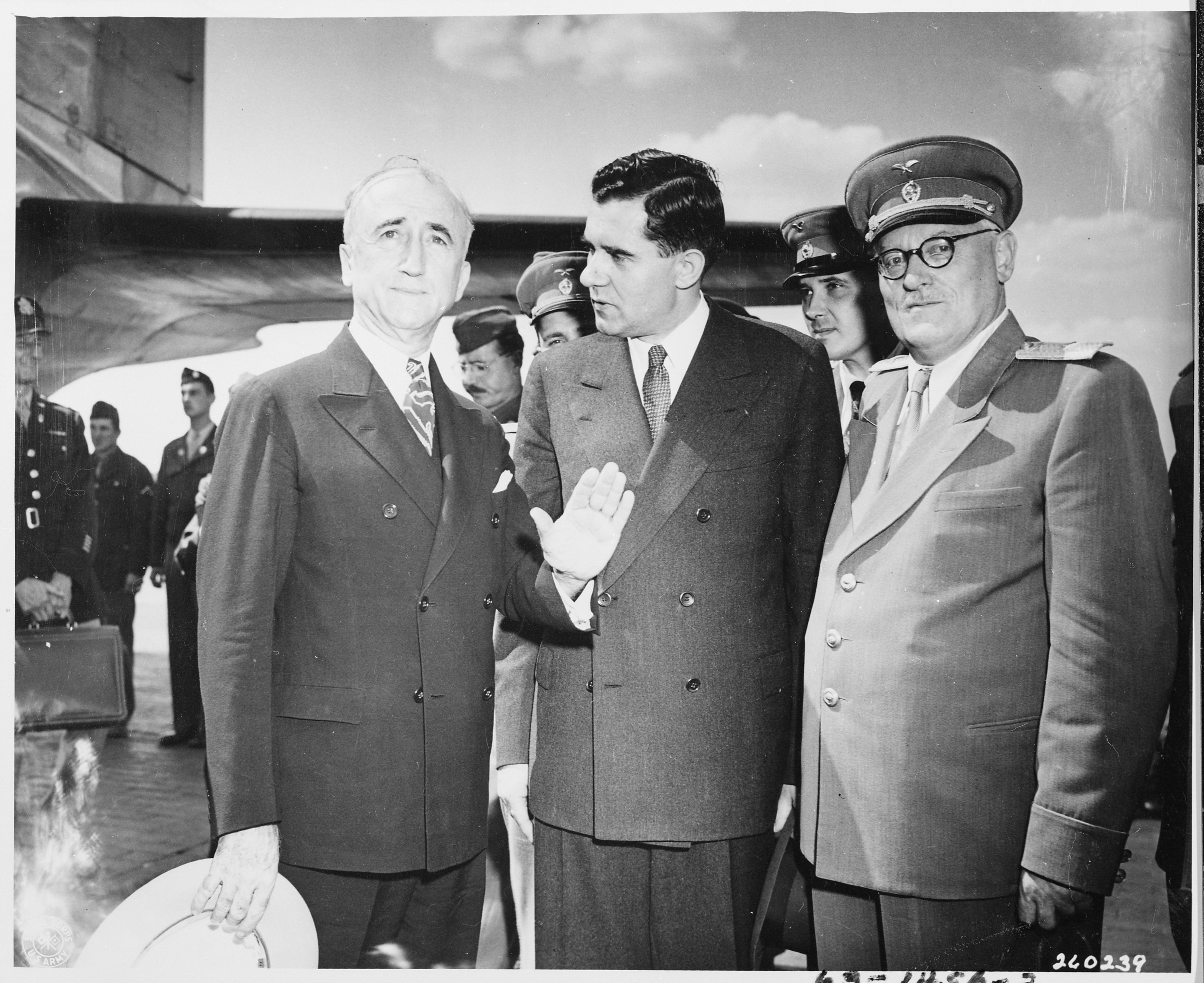
Secretary of State James Byrnes (left) is greeted at the airport en route to the Potsdam Conference by Andrei Gromyko and Vishinsky, 15 July 1945.

Vyshinsky was responsible for the Soviet preparations for the trial of the major German war criminals by the International Military Tribunal. In 1953, he was among the chief figures accused by the U.S. Congress Kersten Committee during its investigation of the Soviet occupation of the Baltic states. The positions he held included those of vice-premier (1939–1944), Deputy Minister of Foreign Affairs (1940–1949), Minister of Foreign Affairs (1949–1953), academician of the Academy of Sciences of the Soviet Union from 1939, and permanent representative of the Soviet Union to the United Nations.

=== Death ===
Vyshinsky refused to return to the Soviet Union after the death of Stalin because he realized he would be prosecuted for his crimes, just like Lavrentiy Beria. Vyshinsky was poisoned by KGB agents on November 22, 1954 in New York City, while his death was officially declared to be a heart attack. His body was delivered by a special flight to Moscow and his ashes buried at the Kremlin Wall Necropolis.

== Scholarship ==
Vyshinsky was the director of the Academy of Sciences of the Soviet Union's Institute of State and Law (ISL). Until the period of de-Stalinization, the Institute of State and Law was named in his honor. During his tenure as director of the ISL, Vyshinsky oversaw the publication of several important monographs on the general theory of state and law.

== Family ==
Vyshinsky married Kapitolina Isidorovna Mikhailova and had a daughter named Zinaida Andreyevna Vyshinskaya (born 1909).

== Awards and decorations ==
- Six Orders of Lenin (1937, 1943, 1945, 1947, 1954)
- Order of the Red Banner of Labour (1933)
- Medal "For the Defence of Moscow" (1944)
- Medal "For Valiant Labour in the Great Patriotic War 1941–1945" (1945).
- Stalin Prize, first class (1947; for the monograph "Theory of forensic evidence in Soviet law")

== In popular culture ==
- The Pet Shop Boys song "This Must Be the Place I Waited Years to Leave" from the album Behaviour (1990) contains a sample of recording from Vyshinsky's speech at the Zinoviev-Kamenev trial of 1936.
- Vyshinsky appears at the beginning of the 2016 novel A Gentleman in Moscow by Amor Towles as the prosecutor in a purported transcript of an appearance by Count Alexander Ilyich Rostov, the novel's gentleman protagonist, before the Emergency Committee of the People's Commissariat for Internal Affairs on 21 June 1922.
- In Gregor Martov's alternative history novel His New Majesty, depicting an alternate history in which Anton Denikin's White forces defeated the Bolsheviks in 1921, Vyshinsky joins the winners and acts as the royal prosecutor in a show trial in which Lenin, Stalin, Trotsky and Bukharin are sentenced to death as "Subversives, Traitors, Blasphemers and Regicides". He is rewarded in being ennobled by the restored czar and made a duke, but gets assassinated by an anarchist girl with whom he had a secret affair.
- In Sergei Loznitsa's 2025 film Two Prosecutors, Vyshinsky is portrayed by Anatoliy Beliy.
- The saying "give me the man; there'll be a paragraph for him", popular in Poland and referring to the miscarriage of justice under the communist regimes, has been attributed to him.

== See also ==
- Roland Freisler, a prosecutor and president of a tribunal established in Nazi Germany to try political crimes

Political offices
Preceded by Vyacheslav Molotov	Foreign Minister of the Soviet Union; 1949–1953	Succeeded by Vyacheslav Molotov
