= Henry Shukman =

English writer and Zen teacher

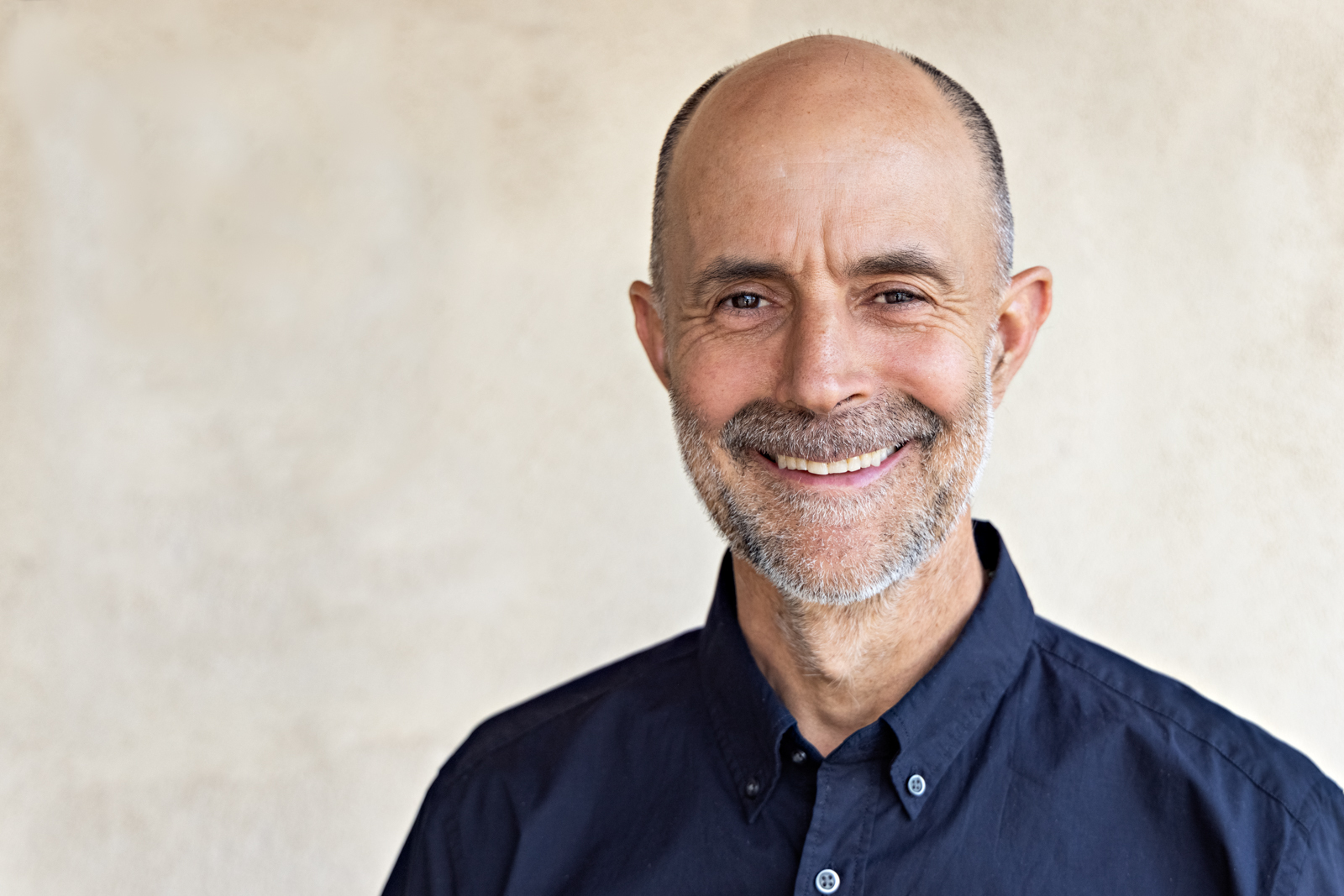
- Born: Henry Matthew Shukman; 26 October 1962 (age 63); Oxford, United Kingdom
- Education: Dragon School; MA from Cambridge and an M.Litt. from St Andrews
- Alma mater: Cambridge, St Andrews
- Title: Co-Founder at The Way, Author, Zen Master
- Spouse: Clare Dunne (m. 1996)
- Parents: Harold Shukman (father); Ann King-Farlow (mother)
- Relatives: David Shukman (brother)
- Website: www.henryshukman.com

Henry Shukman (born 1962 in Oxford, Oxfordshire) is an English meditation teacher, Zen master, poet and author. Shukman teaches mindfulness and awakening practices. He is an authorised Zen master in the Sanbo Zen lineage, the spiritual director emeritus of Mountain Cloud Zen Center, and the co-founder and lead meditation teacher of The Way meditation app. Previous to this, Shukman had a career as an author and poet. Over time, Shukman developed a specific approach to spirituality and meditation, leading to the development in 2021 of his Original Love meditation programme, which includes love for self and the world as its foundation.

== Biography ==
Henry grew up in Oxford, UK, where his parents were professors. His early love of poetry led to an interest in Chinese Zen poetry, and ultimately to becoming a writer and poet for many years. In time it also led to his getting into Zen meditation, though his first practice was Transcendental Meditation. He suffered from severe eczema from infancy into his 20s, along with associated psychological problems, and meditation was a key element in his journey of healing, in addition to various styles of therapy. He has written of his own journey in his book One Blade of Grass: Finding the Old Road of the Heart, a Zen Memoir. He was educated at the Dragon School, Oxford. His father was the historian Harold Shukman and his brother is the BBC News reporter David Shukman. He is of Jewish ancestry; his grandfather, David Shukman, was part of the Jewish community in Baranow, Congress Poland, which was then part of the Russian Empire, before emigrating and settling in the United Kingdom. He is married to artist Clare Dunne and together they are parents to two grown sons.

== Writing career ==
His first book was Sons of the Moon (1989, Weidenfeld and Nicolson / Scribners), which recounted a journey in remote parts of Bolivia in company with photographer Rory Carnegie. Two other travel memoirs followed, Travels with my Trombone (1992, HarperCollins / Crown) about a year working as a musician in calypso, soca and salsa bands in the Caribbean and Colombia, and Savage Pilgrims (1996, HarperCollins / Kodansha) about searching for traces of D.H. Lawrence's life in New Mexico, the only place where Lawrence ever owned a home.

Between 1996 and 2002 he wrote for several US travel magazines and was a contributing editor at Condé Nast Traveler and Islands, while also working on poems and fiction. His first poetry book In Dr No's Garden was published in 2002 and won the Jerwood Aldeburgh prize and was shortlisted for the Forward First Collection Prize. He then started publishing the fiction he had been working on for several years: Darien Dogs (2004, Cape / Random House), Sandstorm (2005, Cape / Random House), and Mortimer of the Maghreb (2006, Knopf). These were followed by the novel The Lost City (2007, Little Brown / Knopf). He won the UK Authors' Club Best First Novel Award for Sandstorm, and The Lost City was a Guardian and Times Book of the Year.

In 2013 he published Archangel (Cape / Random House), a collection of poems which included a sequence of poems about the journey his grandfather and great uncle had made back to Russia in 1917, shipped there by the British government, and arriving a few weeks before the October Revolution. They spent four years trying to get back to the young families they had left behind in London. The poems were based on research his father Harold Shukman had done into this little-known episode of Anglo-Jewish history, in which around 5,000 Jewish men were sent from Britain back to Russia, and which produced Harold's book War or Revolution (2006), his own last book.

In 2019 Shukman published the spiritual memoir One Blade of Grass (Counterpoint / Hodder) which was a Times Literary Supplement Book of the Year.

=== Poetry ===
In 2000 he won the Daily Telegraph Arvon Prize, and in 2003 his first poetry collection, In Dr No's Garden, published by Cape, won the Jerwood Aldeburgh Poetry Prize. His book was also a Book of the Year in The Times and The Guardian, and he was selected as one of the Next Generation poets (2004). His poems have appeared in The New Yorker, The New Republic, The Guardian, The Times, Daily Telegraph, The Independent, The Times Literary Supplement and London Review of Books. In 2013 he wrote a poetry collection Archangel about Jewish tailors sent to Russia to fight in the First World War.

=== Fiction ===
As a fiction writer he won the Author's Club First Novel Award in 2006 for his short novel Sandstorm (Jonathan Cape), and, as well as winning an Arts Council England Writer's Award, he has been a finalist for the O. Henry Award. His second novel was called The Lost City. It was a Guardian Book of the Year, and in America, where it was published by Knopf, it was a National Geographic Book of the Month. He has worked as a travel writer, was Poet in Residence at the Wordsworth Trust.

== Spiritual & Zen Background ==
Shukman is a teacher in the Sanbo Zen lineage and has trained in various other meditation schools and practices. After a spontaneous spiritual awakening at the age of 19, followed by a difficult few years, he embarked on a long journey of healing and deeper awakening, guided by Roshis John Gaynor, Joan Rieck, Ruben Habito, and Yamada Roshi, international abbot of Sanbo Zen, who ultimately appointed him a teacher in 2010. Since then he has taught Zen at Mountain Cloud Zen Center in New Mexico and internationally. Shukman has taught meditation at Harvard Business School, UBS, Wells Fargo, Esalen Institute, and many other organisations. He has also been authorised to teach Mindfulness by Shinzen Young, studied Jhana practice with Stephen Snyder, and is a certified dreamwork therapist. In February 2024, Shukman released a meditation app called The Way. In this app, he offers a single pathway of meditation training that guides students through his approach to meditation.

He is spiritual director emeritus at the Mountain Cloud Zen Center and is a Zen Teacher in the Sanbo Kyodan lineage, with the teaching name Ryu'un.

One Blade of Grass: Finding the Old Road of the Heart, a Zen Memoir was published in October 2019.

== Other professional background ==
Shukman has an MA (Cantab) from Cambridge and an M.Litt. from St Andrews. He has taught writing and literature at the Institute of American Indian Arts in New Mexico, and Poet in Residence at the Wordsworth Trust.

== See also ==
- David Shukman
