= Harold Shukman =

British historian

Harold Shukman (23 March 1931 – 11 July 2012) was a British historian, specialising in the history of Russia.

Shukman was born in London to a family of Jewish immigrants escaping from the Russian Empire. His father, David Shukman, whose first name he gave to his firstborn son David Shukman, was part of the Jewish community who lived in Baranow, Congress Poland, before emigrating and settling in the United Kingdom. After college and national service, he took the Russian course at the Joint Services School for Linguists, in Cambridge and Bodmin, Cornwall. Afterwards, he went on to study Russian and Serbo-Croat at the University of Nottingham, gaining a first-class degree. He received his PhD from Oxford University, his topic being the Jewish Labour Bund. Having completed his doctorate in 1960, he took up an academic career at Oxford where he eventually became the director of the Russian centre at St Antony's College. He retired in 1998.

In addition to numerous academic works, he also translated books by Anatoli Rybakov (Heavy Sand and Children of the Arbat) and a 1994 biography of Vladimir Lenin by Dmitri Volkogonov.

Shukman was married twice. His first wife was Ann King-Farlow, also a Russian scholar, and his second wife Barbara Shukman who is a granddaughter of Benjamin Guggenheim and Florette Seligman Guggenheim, an artist. One son, Henry Shukman, is a Zen meditation teacher. Another son, David Shukman, is a science journalist.

== Selected works ==
- Lenin and the Russian Revolution (1967)
- Stalin (1999)
- A History of World Communism (1975) (with William Deakin and H.T. Willetts)
- Rybakov, Anatoli (1981). Heavy Sand. Translated by Shukman, Harold. New York: Viking Press. ISBN 978-0-67-036499-2.
- Rybakov, Anatoli (1988). Children of the Arbat. Translated by Shukman, Harold. Boston: Little, Brown & Company. ISBN 978-0-31-676372-1.
- (ed.) The Blackwell Encyclopedia of the Russian Revolution (1988)
- (ed.) Agents for Change: Intelligence Services in the 21st Century (2000)
- Secret Classrooms: An Untold Story of the Cold War (2006) (with Geoffrey Elliott)
- War or Revolution: Russian Jews and Conscription in Britain, 1917 (2006)
- Volkogonov, Dmitri (1994). Lenin: A New Biography. Translated by Shukman, Harold. London: HarperCollins. ISBN 978-0-00-255123-6.
