= David Shukman =

British journalist (born 1958)

- Born: David Roderick Shukman; 30 May 1958 (age 68); St Pancras, London, England
- Education: Dragon School; Eton College; Durham University
- Occupation: Journalist
- Employer(s): BBC; Coventry Evening Telegraph (1980–1983)
- Title: Science Editor of BBC News (2012–2021)
- Spouse: Jessica Pryce-Jones (m. 1988)
- Children: 3
- Parents: Harold Shukman (father); Ann King-Farlow (mother)
- Relatives: Henry Shukman (brother); David Pryce-Jones (father-in-law)
- Website: www.davidshukman.com

David Roderick Shukman (born 30 May 1958) is a British journalist, and the former science editor of BBC News.

== Early life ==
Shukman was born in 1958 in St Pancras, London. His paternal grandfather, after whom he was named, came from the Jewish community of Baranów in Congress Poland, then part of the Russian Empire, and later settled in the United Kingdom. His father, Harold Shukman, was a scholar of Russian history at St Antony's College, Oxford. His brother, Henry Shukman, is a meditation teacher and co-founder of The Way.

Shukman was educated at the Dragon School and Eton College. He studied geography at Durham University, where he was a member of Hatfield College and graduated with a bachelor's degree in 1980.

== Career ==
Shukman began his career at the Coventry Evening Telegraph, where he worked from 1980 until joining the BBC in 1983. He served as the BBC's Northern Ireland reporter from 1985 to 1987 and defence correspondent from 1987 to 1995. He was European correspondent from 1995 to 1999 and world affairs correspondent from 1999 to 2003, before becoming environment and science correspondent. As environment and science correspondent, he increasingly focused his reporting on climate change and covered United Nations climate conferences from COP11 onwards.

In January 2012, Shukman was appointed the BBC's first science editor, as part of an expansion of the broadcaster's science coverage.

Shukman left the BBC in 2021 after nearly 40 years with the broadcaster. He subsequently worked as an independent consultant, writer and broadcaster, and in 2022 was appointed Visiting Professor in Practice at the Grantham Research Institute on Climate Change and the Environment at the London School of Economics.

== Personal life ==
In 1998, Shukman married Jessica Pryce-Jones, an author and executive coach. They have three children. He is a member of the Frontline Club.

== Bibliography ==
- Brown, Ben; Shukman, David (1991). All Necessary Means: Inside the Gulf War. BBC Books. ISBN 9780563363040.
- Shukman, David (1996). The Sorcerer's Challenge: Fears and Hopes for the Weapons of the Next Millennium. Coronet Books. ISBN 9780340649916.
- ——— (1996). Tomorrow's War: The Threat of High-Technology Weapons. Pearson Education. ISBN 9780151001989.
- ——— (2010). Reporting Live from the End of the World. Profile Books. ISBN 9781846688874.
- ——— (2011). An Iceberg As Big As Manhattan. Profile Books. ISBN 9781846688881.
- ——— (2026). The Response. Ebury Press. ISBN 9781529953121.

== See also ==
- Environmental journalism
- The British Environment and Media Awards

Media offices
Preceded by Position created	Science Editor: BBC News; 2012–2021	Incumbent
