= Children of the Arbat =

1987 novel by Anatoly Rybakov

- Russian language edition
- Author: Anatoly Rybakov
- Original title: Дети Арбата
- Language: Russian
- Series: Children of the Arbat
- Genre: Historical novel
- Publisher: Little, Brown & Company
- Publication date: 1987
- Publication place: Soviet Union
- English publication date: 1988
- Pages: 685
- Followed by: Fear

Children of the Arbat (Russian: Дети Арбата) is a semi-autobiographical historical novel by Anatoly Rybakov set during the era of Stalin.

== Premise ==
It recounts the era in the Soviet Union of the build-up to the Congress of the Victors, the early years of the second Five Year Plan and the (supposed) circumstances of the murder of Sergey Kirov prior to the beginning of the Great Purge. It is the first book of the trilogy, followed by the books 1935 and Other Years (Russian: Тридцать пятый и другие годы, Book I of Fear, 1989, Fear (Russian: Страх) and Dust and Ashes (Russian: Прах и пепел).

== The novel ==
The story is mainly told through fictional protagonist Sasha Pankratov, a sincere and loyal Komsomol member who is exiled as a result of party intrigues. Rybakov was exiled in the early 1930s. Hysteria grows as simple mistakes and humor are seen as examples of sabotage or acts of wreckers. (The Joke by Milan Kundera deals with similar topics). The book exposes how, despite the honest intentions of Pankratov and older Bolsheviks like Kirov, Stalinism is destroying all their hopes.

The novel is also notable for its portrayal of Joseph Stalin as a scheming and paranoid figure.

The book, which was written between 1966 and 1983, was suppressed until the Perestroika era, published for the first time as a feuilleton in 1987. It was a great publishing sensation of that era, owing to its criticism of the Soviet system, its portrayal of Stalin and harsh in its cynical view of those who turned the Soviet Union into a "Great Power".

== English translation ==
The English translation, by Harold Shukman, was first published in 1988 by Little, Brown & Company (ISBN 9780316763721). It was later reprinted in paperback by Dell Publishing, a division of Bantam Doubleday Dell (ISBN 9780440203537).

== See also ==
- Children of the Arbat – a 16-part television serial based on Rybakov's trilogy
