= Arkady Vaksberg =

Arkady Iosifovich Vaksberg (Russian:Аркадий Иосифович Ваксберг) (11 November 1927 – 8 May 2011) was a Soviet and Russian lawyer, investigative journalist, writer on historical subjects, film maker and playwright.

== Biography ==
Vaksberg was born in Novosibirsk in 1927 (some sources give 1933). He graduated from the law faculty of Moscow State University in 1952. He joined the Soviet Writers' Union in 1973. That same year he began working as a journalist at Literaturnaya gazeta.

He was the author of many books, some of which have been translated into English.

Vaksberg died in Moscow in 2011.

== English translations ==
- Arkady Vaksberg, Stalin's Prosecutor: The Life of Andrei Vyshinsky 1992 ISBN 978-0-312-07135-6
- Stalin Against the Jews 1995 ISBN 978-0-679-75959-1
- The Murder of Maxim Gorky: A Secret Execution 2007
- Toxic Politics (translated by Paul McGregor) ISBN 978-0-313-38746-3
