= Anatoly Rybakov =

Soviet and Ukrainian writer

- Born: Anatoly Naumovich Aronov; 14 January [O.S. 1 January] 1911; Derzhanivka, Chernihiv Governorate, Russian Empire
- Died: 23 December 1998 (aged 87); New York City, New York, U.S.
- Writing career
- Period: 1947–1997

Anatoly Naumovich Rybakov (Russian: Анато́лий Нау́мович Рыбако́в; 14 January [O.S. 1 January] 1911 – 23 December 1998) was a Soviet and Russian writer, the author of the anti-Stalinist Children of the Arbat trilogy, the novel Heavy Sand, and many popular children books including Adventures of Krosh, Dirk and Bronze Bird. One of the last of his works was his memoir The Novel of Memoirs (Роман-Воспоминание) telling about all the different people (from Stalin and Yeltsin, to Okudzhava and Tendryakov) he met during his long life. Writer Maria Rybakova is his granddaughter.

== Biography ==
Rybakov (the birth family name Aronov) was born in Derzhanivka in a Jewish family. In 1934 he was arrested by the NKVD and exiled to Siberia for three years. After the end of his exile, he worked as a transport worker. During World War II, he was a tank commander.

In 1948, he wrote the popular children's book Dirk (Кортик). In 1950, he published the novel Drivers (Водители), then in 1979, the novel Heavy Sand (Тяжёлый Песок) about the fate of a Jewish family under Nazi occupation.

Heavy Sand is an epic story of four generations of a Jewish family living in Communist Russia and its life in a ghetto during the Nazi occupation, culminating in their participation in a ghetto uprising. Though the story of the ghetto uprising is fictional, some details of it seem to be based on the uprising in the Warsaw ghetto. It is believed that the novel is based on numerous stories collected by Rybakov from people who survived Nazi occupation of Ukraine. This story was dubbed the "first Russian Holocaust novel" by one of the Western newspapers of the time. The book became a television series in 2008.

His most popular novel, Children of the Arbat, was written and distributed via samizdat in the 1960s, but was not published until 1987 despite having been officially announced for publication in 1966 and 1978 (in both cases publication was canceled at the very last moment by the Soviet government). The eventual publication of the novel and its 2 sequels – 1935 and Other Years (Тридцать пятый и другие годы) (Book I of Fear) (1989), Fear (Страх) (Books I and II) (1990) and Dust & Ashes (Прах и пепел) (1994) – were considered a landmark of the nascent glasnost, as the first in the trilogy was one of the earliest publications of previously forbidden anti-Stalin literature.

Almost all his books have been made into movies. Rybakov's books have been published in 52 countries, with overall distribution exceeding 20 million copies.

He died in his sleep on December 23, 1998, in New York and was buried at Kuntsevo Cemetery.

Marina Goldovskaya, a Russian-born documentary filmmaker, forged a deep friendship with Rybakov after meeting him at the French Consulate in Moscow. Goldovskaya filmed Rybakov for over a decade; In 2006, seven years after his death, she released her film, a documentary titled Anatoly Rybakov: The Russian Story (Анатолий Рыбаков: Послесловие).

== Awards and honors ==
- Medal "For Battle Merit" (1943)
- Two Orders of the Patriotic War, 2nd class (1945, 1985)
- Order of the Patriotic War, 1st class (1945)
- Stalin Prize, 2nd class (1951) – for his novel "Truckers" (1950)
- Vasilyev Brothers State Prize of the RSFSR (1973) – for the screenplay of the film "Minute of Silence" (1971)
- Order of Friendship of Peoples (1981)
- Order of the Red Banner of Labour
- Medal "For the Capture of Berlin"
- Medal "For the Defence of Leningrad"

== English translations ==
- The Bronze Bird, Progress Publishers, 1975, and Fredonia Books, 2002.
- Heavy Sand, translated by Harold Shukman, Viking Press, 1981.
- Children of the Arbat, translated by Harold Shukman, Little, Brown & Company, 1988.
- Fear, translated by Antonina W. Bouis, Little, Brown & Company, 1992.
- Dust and Ashes, translated by Antonina W. Bouis, Little, Brown & Company, 1996.
- The Dirk, Fredonia Books, 2001.
