= Irada =

Irada or Iroda is a feminine given name of Arabic origin. Notable people with the name include:

== Given name ==
=== Irada ===
- Irada Alili (born 1964), Azerbaijani journalist
- Irada Aliyeva (born 1991), Azerbaijani Paralympic athlete
- Irada Ashumova (born 1958), Azerbaijani sport shooter
- Irada Huseynova (born 1963), Azerbaijani historian and academic
- Irada Rovshan (1968–2014), Azerbaijani scientist

=== Iroda ===
- Iroda Aliyeva (1929–1989), Uzbek actress
- Irodakhon Sadikova (born 2007), Uzbek gymnast
- Iroda Tulyaganova (born 1982), Uzbek tennis player

== Film ==
- Irada (1944 film) (lit. 'intention'), an Indian Bollywood film by Indrapuri Studio starring Patience Cooper, music by Hemanta Mukherjee
- Irada (1991 film), an Indian Bollywood film
- Irada (2017 film) an Indian Bollywod film by Aparnaa Singh
- Irada Pakka, a 2010 Indian Marathi film

== Politics ==
- Al-Irada (Arabic: "The Will") Tunisian political party, founded 2015
- People's Will Party (Arabic: Hizb Al Irada Al-Sha'abia), political party in Syria, founded 2000
