= Ali Shamil =

Azerbaijani folklorist, Turcologist, literary scholar and research fellow

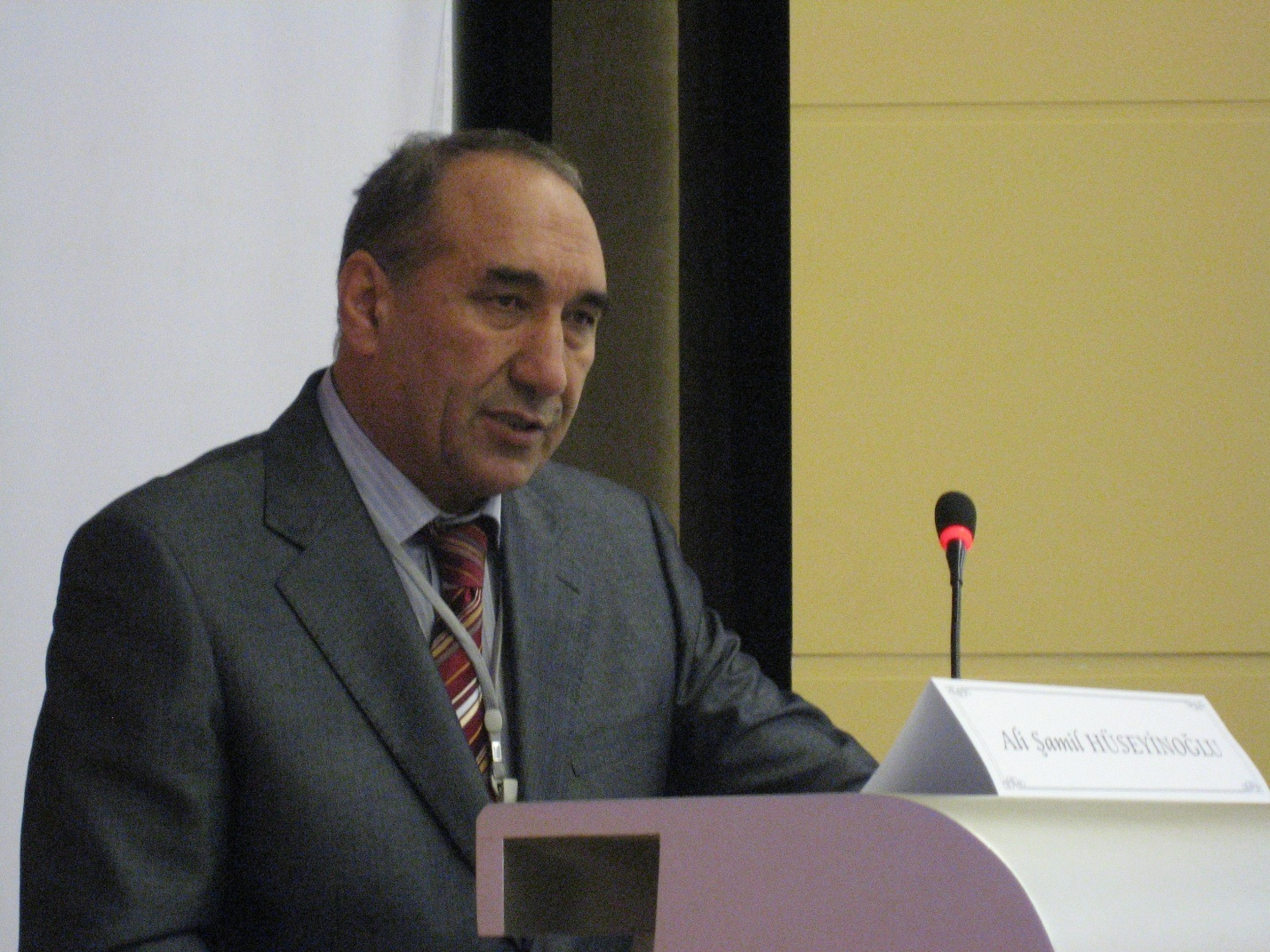
- Born: Əli Hüseyn oğlu Şamilov; June 5, 1948; İnəkdağı, Armenian SSR
- Citizenship: Azerbaijan
- Education: Baku State University
- Spouse: Əzizə Şamil (m. 1973)
- Scientific career
- Fields: Folklore studies, Turkology
- Workplaces: Institute of Folklore of the ANAS
- Website: www.ali-shamil.tr.gg

Ali Shamil (Azerbaijani: Əli Şamil) is an Azerbaijani folklorist, Turcologist, literary scholar and research fellow at the Institute of Folklore of ANAS.

== Life and career ==
Ali Shamil was born on June 5, 1948, in the village of İnəkdağı (now Tretuk), Basargechar District of the Armenian SSR. His family was deported into inner districts of Azerbaijan SSR during the resettlement of the Azerbaijani population of the Armenian SSR with the Decree of the Council of Ministers of the USSR. His family was settled down in the village of Məmmədalılar (now Qapanlı), Shamkhor District of the Azerbaijan SSR, where he studied in a seven-year school in 1954–57. After Stalin's death, the family returned to their native village, where he completed his secondary education in İnəkdağı, then in Mets Mazra and Zod.

In 1968–73, he studied at the Journalism department of the Baku State University. He actively participated in student scientific conferences, was elected as the chairman of the Student Scientific Society of the faculty and deputy chairman of the Student Scientific Society of the university. In 1973, he was sent to work for the newspaper Şərq qapısı, the official mouthpiece of the Communist Party in the Nakhichevan ASSR.

During his student years in Baku, he was a member of the secret meetings. During these years (the period of Brezhnev's stagnation), the development of the Azerbaijani national movement continued mainly underground. He was interrogated by the State Security Committee (well-known KGB) for distributing leaflets and photographs of the ADR period. After the eruption of the Nagorno-Karabakh conflict, he was active in the Meydan movement.

In 1988, he actively participated in the unification of secret organizations in Nakhichevan, and was elected as a member of the Council and Board of the Nakhchivan regional organization of the Azerbaijani Popular Front. Since 1989, he has been one of the organizers of the publication of the illegal (samizdat) newspapers Ağrıdağ (organ of the Nakhchivan Trade Union Council), Varlıq and Güney (organ of the APF of Nakhchivan) and Oyanış, published for the Turks of Iran in the Arabic alphabet, as well as the newspaper İstiqlal. From 1990 to 1993, he worked as a regional correspondent for the newspaper Azadlıq. But due to his opposition to Heydar Aliyev's rule in Nakhichevan, he had to stop his political activities in July 1992. In September 1993, he had to move to Baku. In October 1993, he headed the Uşaq ensiklopediyası (Children's Encyclopedia) group at the Azerbaijan National Encyclopedia. In April 2004, he resigned.

Since 1998, he worked as a research fellow at the Institute of Folklore of the National Academy of Sciences of Azerbaijan, and since 2007 as the head of the international relations department of the same institute.

Ali Shamil is the first researcher of such poets as Almas Ildyrym, Amin Abid Gultekin, Ahiskaly Khasta Gasym, Childirli Ashug Irfani in Azerbaijan. He studies the folklore and literature of the Turkic peoples (Uyghurs, Gagauz, Meskhetian Turks, Turkic peoples of the North Caucasus and Central Asia, Turks of Cyprus, Qashqai in Iran, Turkmens of Syria). He was the organizer of national conferences in Baku, Tbilisi, Istanbul, Bolu and others.

Published works

- Türk xalqlarının tanınmış adamları (co-author; Baku: Azərbaycan Ensiklopediyası, 1998; 2nd edition, 1999),
- Tanıdığım insanlar. I kitab (Baku: Sumqayıt, 2000),
- Dastanlaşmış ömürlər (Bakı: Səda, 2001),
- Quzey Kıbrıs (Baku: Azərbaycan Milli Ensiklopediyası, 2001),
- Burulğandan cıxmaq mümkündürmü? (Baku: Azərbaycan Milli Ensiklopediyası, 2001),
- Uzaq dağların adamı: Ədəbiyyatşünas, şair-publisist, filologiya elmləri doktoru, professor İsmayıl Ömər oğlu Vəliyevin həyat və yaradıcılığı haqqında (co-author; Baku: Azərbaycan Milli Ensiklopediyası, 2002),
- "Koroğlu" dastanı: Əli Kamali arxivindəki variantlar (Baku: Nurlan, 2009),
- Uyğur, Qaqauz, Quzey Qafqaz türklərinin folkloru və ədəbiyyatı (Baku: Nurlan, 2011),
- Axısqalı Xəstə Hasan: Şeirləri və şeirlərinin yaranması haqqında rəvayətlər (Baku: Elm və təhsil, 2012),
- Türkçülüyün qurbanları: Qazaxıstan (Baku: Elm və təhsil, 2013),
- Colan türkmanları: folklor və etnoqrafiya örnəkləri (Baku: Elm və təhsil, 2014),
- Çıldırlı Aşıq İrfani: şeirləri, haqqındakı dastan-rəvayətlər (Baku: Elm və təhsil, 2016),
- Dissident sorağında (co-author; Baku: Elm və təhsil, 2018), the same in Russian В поисках диссидентов (co-author; 2018),
- Qaşqaylar və onların folkloru (Baku: Elm və təhsil, 2020),
- Albaniya və Azərbaycandakı Albanlar (Baku: Köhlən, 2021),
- Parçalanmış Türküstanı gəzərkən (Baku: Elm və təhsil, 2021),
- Yol dəftərimdən: Quzey Qafqaz. Ukrayna. Moldova. Güney Koreya (Baku: Köhlən, 2022),
- Milli düşüncə fədaisi - Arif Rəhimoğlu (co-author; Bakı: Elm və təhsil, 2023).
