= List of Azerbaijani architects =

This is a list of notable Azerbaijani architects.

== A–M ==
- Zivar bey Ahmadbeyov
- Sadig Dadashov
- Anvar Gasimzade
- Gasim bey Hajibababeyov
- Mammad Hasan Hajinski
- Mikayil Huseynov
- Karbalayi Safikhan Karabakhi
- Kamal Mammadbeyov
- Gulnara Mehmandarova

== N–Z ==
- Irada Rovshan
- Fuad Seyidzadeh
- Nariman Imamaliyev

== Gallery ==
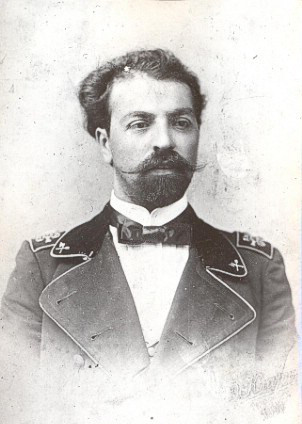
Zivar bey Ahmadbeyov

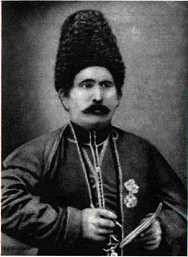
Gasim bey Hajibababeyov

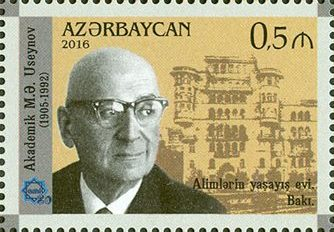
Mikayil Huseynov

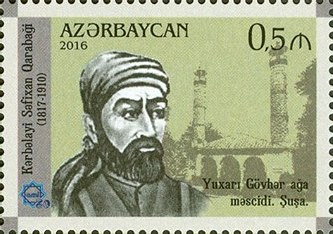
Karbalayi Safikhan Karabakhi

== See also ==
- List of architects
- List of Azerbaijanis
