= General Secretary of the Communist Party of the Soviet Union =

Highest political position in the Soviet Union

General Secretary of the Central Committee of the Communist Party of the Soviet Union
- Генеральный секретарь ЦК КПСС
- Emblem of the Communist Party of the Soviet Union

- Longest serving Joseph Stalin; 3 April 1922 – 16 October 1952 (de facto 5 March 1953)
- Central Committee of the Communist Party
- Style: Comrade General Secretary (informal)
- Type: Party leader
- Status: Country leader
- Member of: Politburo; and Secretariat
- Residence: Kremlin Senate
- Seat: Kremlin, Moscow
- Appointer: Central Committee
- Term length: Life tenure
- Formation: 3 April 1922; 104 years ago
- First holder: Joseph Stalin
- Final holder: Vladimir Ivashko (acting)
- Abolished: 29 August 1991; 35 years ago
- Superseded by: Chairman of the Union of Communist Parties
- Deputy: Second Secretary
- Salary: 10,000 Rbls annually

The General Secretary of the Central Committee of the Communist Party of the Soviet Union (Note: Russian: Генеральный секретарь ЦК КПСС, romanized: Kommunisticheskaya partiya Sovetskovo Soyuza, IPA: [kəmʊnʲɪsʲˈtʲitɕɪskəjə ˈpartʲɪjə sɐˈvʲetskəvə sɐˈjuzə].) was the leader of the Communist Party of the Soviet Union (CPSU). From 1924 until the country's dissolution in 1991, the officeholder was the recognized leader of the Soviet Union. Prior to Joseph Stalin's accession, the position was not viewed as an important role in Vladimir Lenin's government and previous occupants had been responsible for technical rather than political decisions.

Under Stalin, the office of general secretary became the most powerful position in the Communist Party. Since the party had a monopoly on political power, the general secretary de facto had executive control of the Soviet government. Because of the office's ability to direct both the foreign and domestic policies of the state and preeminence over the Soviet Communist Party, it was the de facto highest office of the Soviet Union.

== History ==
Before the October Revolution, the job of the party secretary was largely that of a bureaucrat. Following the Bolshevik seizure of power, the Office of the Responsible Secretary was established in 1919 to perform administrative work. After the Bolshevik victory in the Russian Civil War, the Office of General Secretary was created by Vladimir Lenin in 1922 with the intention that it serve a purely administrative and disciplinary purpose. Its primary task would be to determine the composition of party membership and to assign positions within the party. The General Secretary also oversaw the recording of party events, and was entrusted with keeping party leaders and members informed about party activities.

When assembling his cabinet, Lenin appointed Joseph Stalin to be General Secretary. Over the next few years, Stalin was able to use the principles of democratic centralism to transform his office into that of party leader, and eventually leader of the Soviet Union. Trotsky attributed his appointment to the initial recommendation of Grigory Zinoviev. This view has been supported by several historians. According to Russian historian, Vadim Rogovin, Stalin's election to the position occurred after the Eleventh Party Congress (March–April 1922), in which Lenin, due to his poor health, participated only sporadically, and only attended four of the twelve sessions of the Congress.

Some historians have regarded the premature death of prominent Bolshevik Yakov Sverdlov to have been a key factor in facilitating the elevation of Joseph Stalin to the position of leadership in the Soviet Union. Sverdlov served as the original chairman of the party secretariat and was considered a natural candidate for the position of General Secretary.

Prior to Lenin's death in 1924, Stalin's tenure as General Secretary was already being criticized. In Lenin's final months, he authored a pamphlet that called for Stalin's removal on the grounds that Stalin was becoming authoritarian and abusing his power. The pamphlet triggered a political crisis which endangered Stalin's position as General Secretary, and a vote was held to remove him from office. With the help of Grigory Zinoviev and Lev Kamenev, Stalin was able to survive the scandal and remained in his post. After Lenin's death, Stalin began to consolidate his power by using the office of General Secretary. By 1928, he had unquestionably become the de facto leader of the USSR, while the position of General Secretary became the highest office in the nation. In 1934, the 17th Party Congress refrained from formally re-electing Stalin as General Secretary. However, Stalin was re-elected to all the other positions he held, and remained leader of the party without diminution.

In the 1950s, Stalin increasingly withdrew from Secretariat business, leaving the supervision of the body to Georgy Malenkov, possibly to test his abilities as a potential successor. In October 1952, at the 19th Party Congress, Stalin restructured the party's leadership. His request, voiced through Malenkov, to be relieved of his duties in the party secretariat due to his age, was rejected by the party congress, as delegates were unsure about Stalin's intentions. In the end, the congress formally abolished Stalin's office of General Secretary, although Stalin remained the highest-ranked party secretary and maintained ultimate control of the party. When Stalin died on 5 March 1953, Malenkov was considered to be the most important member of the Secretariat, which also included Nikita Khrushchev, among others. Under a short-lived troika consisting of Malenkov, Beria, and Molotov, Malenkov became Chairman of the Council of Ministers, but was forced to resign from the Secretariat nine days later on 14 March. This effectively left Khrushchev in control of the government, and he was elected to the new office of First Secretary of the Communist Party of the Soviet Union at the Central Committee plenum on 14 September that same year. Khrushchev subsequently outmanoeuvred his rivals, who sought to challenge his political reforms. He was able to comprehensively remove Malenkov, Molotov and Lazar Kaganovich (one of Stalin's oldest and closest associates) from power in 1957, an achievement which also helped to reinforce the supremacy of the position of First Secretary.

In 1964, opposition within the Politburo and the Central Committee, which had been increasing since the aftermath of the Cuban Missile Crisis, led to Khrushchev's removal from office. Leonid Brezhnev succeeded Khrushchev as First Secretary, but was initially obliged to govern as part of a collective leadership, forming another troika with Premier Alexei Kosygin and Chairman Nikolai Podgorny. The office was renamed to General Secretary in 1966. The collective leadership was able to limit the powers of the General Secretary during the Brezhnev Era. Brezhnev's influence grew throughout the 1970s as he was able to retain support by avoiding any radical reforms. After Brezhnev's death, Yuri Andropov and Konstantin Chernenko were able to rule the country in the same way as Brezhnev had. Mikhail Gorbachev ruled the Soviet Union as General Secretary until 1990, when the Communist Party lost its monopoly of power over the political system. The office of President of the Soviet Union was established so that Gorbachev could still retain his role as leader of the Soviet Union. Following the failed August coup of 1991, Gorbachev resigned as General Secretary. He was succeeded by his deputy, Vladimir Ivashko, who only served for five days as Acting General Secretary before Boris Yeltsin, the newly elected President of Russia, suspended all activity in the Communist Party. Following the party's ban, the Union of Communist Parties – Communist Party of the Soviet Union (UCP–CPSU) was established by Oleg Shenin in 1993, and is dedicated to reviving and restoring the CPSU. The organisation has members in all the former Soviet republics.

== List of officeholders ==
Portrait	Name (Birth–Death)	Term			Notes
Portrait	Name (Birth–Death)	Took office	Left office	Duration	Notes
Chairman of the Secretariat of the Central Committee of the Russian Communist Party (Bolsheviks) (1918–1919)
A man in a black suit, black shirt and wearing a pair of glasses	Yakov Sverdlov (1885–1919)	8 March 1918	16 March 1919 †	1 year, 8 days	Sverdlov was one of five secretaries elected to the first Secretariat at the 6th Party Congress on 19 August 1917, and rose to first among them before being elected chairman at the 7th Congress. Until Stalin, the office was mainly responsible for technical rather than political matters.
Responsible Secretary of the Central Committee of the Russian Communist Party (Bolsheviks) (1919–1922)
A woman wearing dark clothes and using a pair of glasses	Elena Stasova (1873–1966)	25 March 1919	29 November 1919	249 days	Stasova previously served as the original secretary of the Central Committee, appointed on 13 March 1917, and as a member of the first Secretariat, where her title was Technical Secretary. She was elected Responsible Secretary at the 8th Party Congress.
A man in a grey suit, light shirt and dark tie	Nikolay Krestinsky (1883–1938)	29 November 1919	16 March 1921	1 year, 107 days	When Krestinsky was elected Responsible Secretary, Stasova was demoted to Secretary.
A man in a dark suit, light shirt and dark tie, smiling	Vyacheslav Molotov (1890–1986)	16 March 1921	3 April 1922	1 year, 18 days	Molotov was elected Responsible Secretary at the 10th Party Congress. The Congress decided that the office of Responsible Secretary should have a presence at Politburo plenums. As a result, Molotov became a candidate member of the Politburo.
General Secretary of the Central Committee of the All-Union Communist Party (Bolsheviks) (1922–1952)
	Joseph Stalin (1878–1953)	3 April 1922	16 October 1952	30 years, 196 days	Stalin, elected General Secretary at the 11th Party Congress, used the office to appoint loyalists to positions in the party and create a strong power base for himself. He was not formally re-elected as General Secretary at the 17th Party Congress in 1934, and the office was rarely mentioned after that. On October 16, 1952, Stalin formally abolished the position at the 19th Party Congress, but he retained ultimate power and his position as Chairman of the Council of Ministers until his death on 5 March 1953. At a tenure of 30 years, 7 months, Stalin was the longest-serving General Secretary, serving almost half of the USSR's entire existence.
First Secretary of the Central Committee of the Communist Party of the Soviet Union (1953–1966)
An elderly bald man in a suit, with several medals pinned on it	Nikita Khrushchev (1894–1971)	7 September 1953	14 October 1964	11 years, 30 days	After Stalin's death, Georgy Malenkov briefly ranked first in the Secretariat until he was forced to give up his position to Khrushchev on 14 March 1953. In September, Khrushchev was elected First Secretary, reestablishing the office. Khrushchev was removed as leader in 1964, and replaced by Leonid Brezhnev.
	Leonid Brezhnev (1906–1982)	14 October 1964	8 April 1966	1 year, 176 days	Brezhnev was part of a collective leadership. He formed an unofficial Triumvirate (also known by its Russian name troika) alongside the country's Premier, Alexei Kosygin, and Nikolai Podgorny who became in 1965 a Chairman of the Presidium. The office of First Secretary was renamed General Secretary at the 23rd Party Congress in 1966.
General Secretary of the Central Committee of the Communist Party of the Soviet Union (1966–1991)
	Leonid Brezhnev (1906–1982)	8 April 1966	10 November 1982 †	16 years, 216 days	Brezhnev's powers and functions as the General Secretary were limited by the collective leadership. By the 1970s, Brezhnev's influence exceeded that of Kosygin and Podgorny as he was able to retain support by avoiding any radical reforms.
	Yuri Andropov (1914–1984)	12 November 1982	9 February 1984 †	1 year, 89 days	He emerged as Brezhnev's most likely successor as the chairman of the committee in charge of managing Brezhnev's funeral. Andropov ruled the country in the same way Brezhnev had before he died.
	Konstantin Chernenko (1911–1985)	13 February 1984	10 March 1985 †	1 year, 25 days	Chernenko was 72 years old when elected to the post of General Secretary and in rapidly failing health. Like Andropov, Chernenko ruled the country in the same way Brezhnev had.
A man in a grey suit, white shirt and dark tie, balding with grey hair, he has a birthmark on his forehead	Mikhail Gorbachev (1931–2022)	11 March 1985	24 August 1991	6 years, 166 days	The 1990 Congress of People's Deputies removed Article 6 from the 1977 Soviet Constitution resulting in the Communist Party loss of its position as the "leading and guiding force of the Soviet society." The powers of the General Secretary were drastically curtailed. Throughout the rest of his tenure, Gorbachev ruled through the office of President of the Soviet Union. He resigned from his party office on 24 August 1991 in the aftermath of the August Coup.
	Vladimir Ivashko (1932–1994); Acting	24 August 1991	29 August 1991	5 days	Ivashko was elected Deputy General Secretary at the 28th Party Congress. He became acting General Secretary following Gorbachev's resignation, but by then the Party was politically impotent. Its activities were suspended on 29 August 1991, and it was banned on 6 November.

== Second Secretary of the Communist Party of the Soviet Union ==
The Second Secretary was the deputy to the General Secretary. They sat alongside the General Secretary on the Secretariat and often in practice Chaired the meetings of the Secretariat because the General Secretary was busy fulfilling other duties. They were often very powerful and sat on the Politburo as well. The Second Secretary was seen as a stepping stone to General Secretary and were often in charge of Party Personnel. Prominent Second Secretaries include Mikhail Suslov, Frol Kozlov, and Nikolai Podgorny as well as all Post Stalin General Secretaries.

== See also ==
- General Secretary of the Communist Party
- General Secretary of the Chinese Communist Party
- General Secretary of the Workers' Party of Korea
- General Secretary of the Communist Party of Vietnam
- General Secretary of the Lao People's Revolutionary Party
- First Secretary of the Communist Party of Cuba
- Leader of the League of Communists of Yugoslavia
- Cheget

== Bibliography ==
- Armstrong, John Alexander (1986). Ideology, Politics, and Government in the Soviet Union: An Introduction. University Press of America. ASIN B002DGQ6K2.
- Backes, Uwe; Moreau, Patrick (2008). Communist and Post-Communist Parties in Europe. Vandenhoeck & Ruprecht. ISBN 978-3-525-36912-8.
- Baylis, Thomas A. (1989). Governing by Committee: Collegial Leadership in Advanced Societies. State University of New York Press. ISBN 978-0-88706-944-4.
- Brown, Archie (2009). The Rise & Fall of Communism. Bodley Head. ISBN 978-0061138799.
- Chubarov, Alexander (2003). Russia's Bitter Path to Modernity: A History of the Soviet and post-Soviet Eras. Continuum International Publishing Group. ISBN 978-0826413505.
- Clements, Barbara Evans (1997). Bolshevik Women. Cambridge University Press. ISBN 978-0521599207.
- Fainsod, Merle; Hough, Jerry F. (1979). How the Soviet Union is Governed. Harvard University Press. ISBN 978-0674410305.
- Fairfax, Kaithy (1999). Comrades in Arms: Bolshevik Women in the Russian Revolution. Resistance Books. ISBN 090919694X.
- Grill, Graeme (2002). The Origins of the Stalinist Political System. Cambridge University Press. ISBN 978-0521529365.
- March, Luke (2002). The Communist Party In Post-Soviet Russia. Manchester University Press. ISBN 978-0-7190-6044-1.
- Kort, Michael (2010). The Soviet Colossus: History and Aftermath. M.E. Sharpe. ISBN 978-0-7656-2387-4.
- Löwenhardt, John; Ozinga, James R.; van Ree, Erik (2024). The Rise and Fall of the Soviet Politburo. taylor & Francis. ISBN 978-1040007365.
- McCauley, Martin (1998). Gorbachev. Pearson Education. ISBN 978-0582437586.
- McCauley, Martin (1997). Who's who in Russia since 1900. Routledge. ISBN 0-415-13898-1.
- Medvedev, Zhores; Medvedev, Roy (2006). The Unknown Stalin. I.B. Tauris. ISBN 978-1585675029.
- Phillips, Steve (2001). The Cold War: conflict in Europe and Asia. Heinemann. ISBN 978-0435327361.
- Ra'anan, Uri (2006). Flawed Succession: Russia's Power Transfer Crises. Lexington Books. ISBN 978-0739114025.
- Radetsky, Peter (2007). The Soviet Image: A Hundred Years of Photographs from Inside the TASS Archives. Chronicle Books. ISBN 978-0811857987.
- Rappaport, Helen (1999). Joseph Stalin: A Biographical Companion. ABC-CLIO. ISBN 978-1576070840.
- Rogovin, Vadim (2001). Stalin's Terror of 1937–1938: Political Genocide in the USSR. Mehring Books. ISBN 978-1893638082.
- Service, Robert (2009). History of Modern Russia: From Tsarism to the Twenty-first Century. Penguin Books Ltd. ISBN 978-0674034938.
- Taubman, William (2003). Khrushchev: The Man and His Era. W.W. Norton & Company. ISBN 978-0393051445.
- Ulam, Adam (2007). Stalin: The Man and His Era. Tauris Parke Paperbacks. ISBN 978-1-84511-422-0.
- Vasilʹeva, Larisa Nikolaevna (1994). Kremlin Wives. Arcade Publishing. ISBN 978-1559702607.
- White, Stephen (2000). Russia's New Politics: The Management of a Postcommunist Society. Cambridge University Press. ASIN B003QI0DQE.
- Williamson, D.G. (2007). The Age of the Dictators: A Study of the European Dictatorships, 1918–53 (1st ed.). Pearson Education. ISBN 978-0582505803.
- Zemtsov, Ilya (2001). Encyclopedia of Soviet Life. Transaction Publishers. ISBN 978-0887383502.
