= Irada Huseynova =

- İradə Mehtiqulu qızı Hüseynova
- Born: April 19, 1963; Baku, Azerbaijan SSR, USSR

Irada Mehtigulu gizi Huseynova (born April 19, 1963, Baku) is an Azerbaijani historian and academic. She holds a doctorate in historical sciences (2003) and the rank of professor (2005). She served as Deputy Minister of Education of the Republic of Azerbaijan from 2002 to 2011, having been appointed by presidential order of Heydar Aliyev. Since 2011, she has headed the Department of History of the Caucasian Peoples at the Faculty of History of Baku State University. Huseynova graduated with honours from Azerbaijan State University in 1985 and has been active in academic, political, and public roles throughout her career. She has been a longstanding member of the New Azerbaijan Party and has received a number of national and international awards, including the honorary title of "Honored Teacher" conferred by President Ilham Aliyev in 2008.

== Life and education ==
Irada Huseynova was born on April 19, 1963 in Baku. In 1980, she graduated from secondary school No. 8 in Baku with excellent grades. In 1980, she entered the full-time department of the Faculty of History of Azerbaijan State University and graduated with honours in 1985.

In 1981, while studying in the second year of the full-time department of the Faculty of History of Azerbaijan State University, she began her labour activity, was elected as the full-time deputy chairman of the university's trade union organisation, and worked from 1981 to 1989. To continue her scientific and pedagogical activities, she was retained at the university by the decision of the Scientific Council and the appointment of the Ministry of Education. In 1982–1987, she was a representative of the XVI and XVII congresses of the Azerbaijan SSR Trade Union and the XVII and XVIII congresses of the USSR Trade Union, a member of the Central Inspection Commission and the Presidium of the USSR Trade Union, representing Azerbaijan at the all-Union level. She subsequently defended both her candidate's dissertation and her doctoral dissertation in history, receiving the degree of Doctor of Historical Sciences in 2003.

== Socio-political activity ==
She was a representative of the I Forum of Creative Intellectuals of the CIS countries, held on October 7–8, 2004.

She delivered a report on "Democratic and Civic Principles in Education" at the international conference held by the Council of Europe in Strasbourg on December 6–7, 2001.

Irada Huseynova was appointed Deputy Minister of Education of the Republic of Azerbaijan by the order of the President of the Republic of Azerbaijan Heydar Aliyev dated August 7, 2002, and worked in this position from 2002 to 2011. From 2006, by presidential orders of President Ilham Aliyev, she was appointed a member of the Intergovernmental Commission of the Republic of Azerbaijan and the Republic of Belarus, and of the Intergovernmental Commission on Cooperation of the Republic of Azerbaijan with the city of Moscow.

== Labor activity ==
From 1981 to 1989, Huseynova served as deputy chairman of the Student Trade Union of Azerbaijan State University. Beginning in 1985, she held a series of progressively senior academic positions in the Department of History of the USSR and the Soviet Period at Azerbaijan State University, including senior researcher, teacher, senior lecturer, associate professor, and professor, until 2005. The department was later renamed the Department of History of Turkic and Caucasian Peoples of Baku State University. By presidential order of Heydar Aliyev dated August 7, 2002, she was appointed Deputy Minister of Education of the Republic of Azerbaijan, a position she held until 2011. Since 2011, she has served as Head of the Department of History of the Caucasian Peoples of Baku State University.

== Party activity ==
In 2000, she was nominated as a candidate for a deputy to the Milli Majlis in the proportional system elections of the New Azerbaijan Party.

From 1999 to 2021, she was a member of the Political Council of the "New Azerbaijan" party's governing body - the "New Azerbaijan" party - from the 1st Congress to the 7th Congress. She was also the chairman of the Women's Council of the "New Azerbaijan" party at Baku State University.

In May 2014, she was elected a member of the Women's Council and Board of Directors of the New Azerbaijan Party for the Republic.

In 2014, she was elected Deputy Chairman of the Commission on Humanitarian Issues of the New Azerbaijan Party.

== Awards ==
- 2007 - Winner of the European Commission TEMPUS Individual Travel Grant and delivered a scientific report at the international conference on science and education issues held in Sweden within the framework of the TEMPUS Program.
- In September 2008, she was awarded the honorary title of "Honored Teacher" by the decree of the President of the Republic of Azerbaijan Ilham Aliyev.
- 2011 - Awarded the International "Socrates" Prize at Oxford University in England for her services in the development of science, education and innovations.
- She is a member of the editorial board of the journal History of Science.

== See also ==
- Israfil Abbaslı
- Ali Shamil
