= Alili =

Alili or Əlili is a surname. Notable people with the surname include:

- Irada Alili (born 1964), Azerbaijani journalist
- Besir Alili (born 2003), Macedonian freestyle wrestler
