= Bagir Seyidzadeh =

Azerbaijani diplomat (1912–1968)

- Born: August 9, 1912; Yerevan, Armenian Oblast, Caucasus Viceroyalty, Russian Empire
- Died: March 24, 1968 (aged 55); Baku, Azerbaijan SSR, Soviet Union
- Children: 2, including Fuad Seyidzadeh

Bagir Mirgasim Seyidzadeh (Azerbaijani: Bağır Mirqasım oğlu Seyidzadə; 9 August 1912 – 24 March 1968) was an acclaimed Azerbaijani public figure, diplomat, journalist, honorary culture worker of the Azerbaijani SSR.

== Biography ==
In 1925, Bagir Seyidzadeh came to Baku. He got a job at Taghiyev's plant, which was later renamed after Lenin. After a while he entered the working faculty, which he graduated from in 1930. For a couple of months, Bagir Seyidzadeh worked as a proofreader at Kandli newspaper. He then graduated from the faculty of oil technology of the Azerbaijani Industrial Institute.

In 1932–1940, he worked as the secretary and editor at Ganj ishi (Youth affairs) newspaper.

In 1940–1943, he was the secretary of the Central Committee of the Leninist Young Communist League of the Azerbaijani SSR.

After completing diplomatic courses in Moscow, Bagir Seyidzadeh was sent to Iran where he started his diplomatic career. In 1944–1949, he was the consul, vice consul and chief consul in Maku and Tabriz. Bagir Seyidzadeh played an important role in establishing the government in Southern Azerbaijan, for which he was awarded "21 Azer" medal by the national government.

After returning from Iran he was appointed the minister of cinematography of the Azerbaijani SSR. He created the press department, which he later headed. The department merged with the ministry of culture of the Azerbaijani SSR, and Bagir Seyidzadeh was appointed the deputy minister of culture.

He was also involved in journalism and translation. He translated several parts of «Жизнь замечательных людей» (The life of remarkable people) series into Azerbaijani. Bagir Seyidzadeh is considered one of the founders of the Azerbaijani school of translation. He was the deputy Director General of Azerinform (AzerTAc).

He had a son, Fuad Seyidzadeh and a daughter, Dilara Seyidzadeh.

Bagir Seyidzadeh died of an extensive heart attack. He was buried at the Alley of Honors in Baku.
