= List of leaders of the Soviet Union =

Leader of the Soviet Union
- Лидер Советского Союза (Russian)
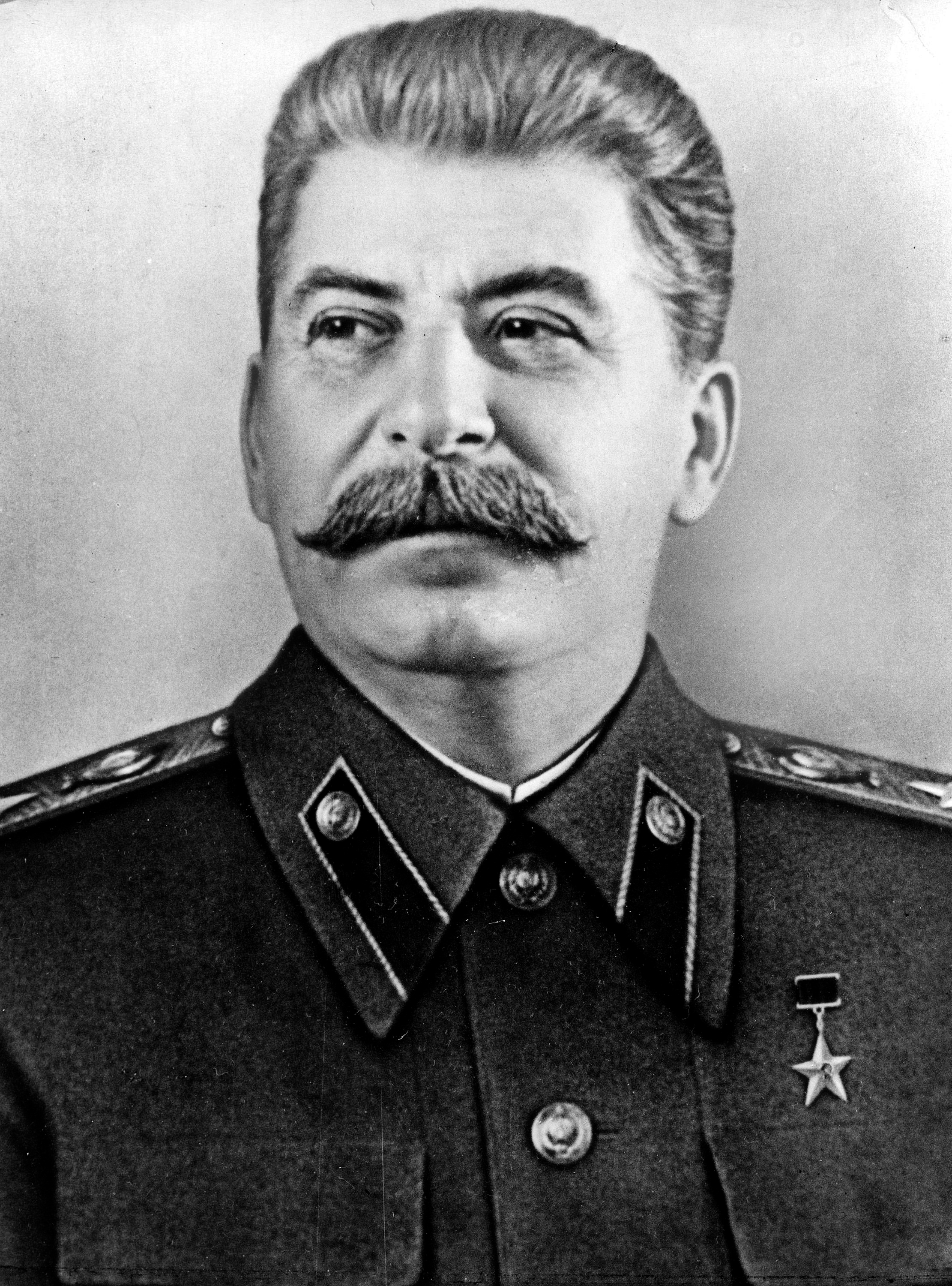
- Longest serving Joseph Stalin; 21 January 1924 – 5 March 1953
- Type: Party leader
- Term length: Life tenure
- Formation: 30 December 1922; 103 years ago
- First holder: Vladimir Lenin
- Final holder: Mikhail Gorbachev
- Abolished: 26 December 1991; 34 years ago
- Succession: General Secretary of the Commonwealth of Independent States; President of Russia

During its 69-year history, the Soviet Union usually had a de facto leader who would not always necessarily be head of state or even head of government but almost always held office as Communist Party General Secretary. (Note: Under the 1977 Constitution, the chairman of the Council of Ministers was the head of government and the chairman of the Presidium of the Supreme Soviet was the head of state.) The office of the chairman of the Council of Ministers was comparable to a prime minister in the First World whereas the office of the chairman of the Presidium was comparable to a president. According to Marxist–Leninist ideology, the head of the Soviet state was a collegiate body of the vanguard party (as described in Lenin's What Is to Be Done?).

Following Joseph Stalin's consolidation of power in the late 1920s, the post of the general secretary of the Central Committee of the Communist Party became synonymous with leader of the Soviet Union, because the post controlled both the Communist Party and (via party membership) the Soviet government. Often the general secretary also held high positions in the government. Since the post of general secretary lacked clear guidelines of succession, the office's successor needed the support of the Political Bureau (Politburo), the Central Committee, or another government or party apparatus to consolidate power. The President of the Soviet Union, an office created in March 1990, replaced the general secretary as the highest Soviet political office.

Contemporaneously to the establishment of the office of the president, representatives of the Congress of People's Deputies voted to remove Article 6 from the Soviet constitution which stated that the Soviet Union was a one-party state controlled by the Communist Party which in turn played the leading role in society. This vote weakened the party and its hegemony over the Soviet Union and its people. Upon the departure of an incumbent president from office, the Vice President of the Soviet Union would assume the office, though the Soviet Union dissolved before this was actually tested. After the failed coup in August 1991, the vice president was replaced by an elected member of the State Council of the Soviet Union.

== Summary ==
Lenin was elected chairman of the Council of People's Commissars of the Soviet Union (Sovnarkom) on 30 December 1922 by the Congress of Soviets. At the age of 53, his health declined from the effects of two bullet wounds, later aggravated by three strokes which culminated with his death in 1924. Irrespective of his health status in his final days, Lenin was already losing much of his power to Joseph Stalin. Alexei Rykov succeeded Lenin as chairman of the Sovnarkom, and although he was de jure the most powerful person in the country, in fact, all power was concentrated in the hands of the "troika" – the union of three influential party figures: Grigory Zinoviev, Joseph Stalin, and Lev Kamenev. Stalin continued to increase his influence in the party, and by the end of the 1920s, he became the sole dictator of the USSR, defeating all his political opponents. The post of general secretary of the party, which was held by Stalin, became the most important post in the Soviet hierarchy.

Stalin's early policies pushed for rapid industrialisation, nationalisation of private industry and the collectivisation of private plots created under Lenin's New Economic Policy. As leader of the Politburo, Stalin consolidated near-absolute power by 1938 after the Great Purge, a series of campaigns of political murder, repression and persecution. On 22 June 1941 Nazi Germany invaded the Soviet Union, but by December the Soviet Army managed to stop the attack just shy of Moscow. On Stalin's orders, the Soviet Union launched a counter-attack on Nazi Germany, which finally succeeded in 1945. Stalin died in March 1953 and his death triggered a power struggle in which Nikita Khrushchev ultimately emerged victorious over Georgy Malenkov.

Khrushchev denounced Stalin on two occasions, first in 1956 and then in 1962. His policy of de-Stalinisation earned him many enemies within the party, especially from old Stalinist appointees. Many saw this approach as destructive and destabilizing. A group known as Anti-Party Group tried to oust Khrushchev from office in 1957, but it failed. As Khrushchev grew older, his erratic behaviour became worse, usually making decisions without discussing or confirming them with the Politburo. Leonid Brezhnev, a close companion of Khrushchev, was elected the first secretary the same day of Khrushchev's removal from power. Alexei Kosygin became the new premier, and Anastas Mikoyan kept his office as chairman of the Presidium of the Supreme Soviet. On the orders of the Politburo, Mikoyan was forced to retire in 1965, and Nikolai Podgorny took over the office of chairman of the Presidium. The Soviet Union in the post-Khrushchev 1960s was governed by a collective leadership. Henry Kissinger, the American National Security Advisor, mistakenly believed that Kosygin was the leader of the Soviet Union and that he was at the helm of Soviet foreign policy because he represented the Soviet Union at the 1967 Glassboro Summit Conference. The "Era of Stagnation", a derogatory term coined by Mikhail Gorbachev, was a period marked by low socio-economic efficiency in the country and a gerontocracy ruling the country. Yuri Andropov (aged 68 at the time) succeeded Brezhnev in his post as general secretary in 1982. In 1983, Andropov was hospitalized and rarely met up at work to chair the politburo meetings due to his declining health. Nikolai Tikhonov usually chaired the meetings in his place. Following Andropov's death fifteen months after his appointment, an even older leader, 72-year-old Konstantin Chernenko, was elected to the general secretariat. His rule lasted for little more than a year until his death thirteen months later on 10 March 1985.

At the age of 54, Mikhail Gorbachev was elected to the general secretariat by Politburo on 11 March 1985. In May 1985, Gorbachev publicly admitted the slowing down of the economic development and inadequate living standards, being the first Soviet leader to do so while also beginning a series of fundamental reforms. From 1986 to around 1988, he dismantled central planning, allowed state enterprises to set their own outputs, enabled private investment in businesses not previously permitted to be privately owned, and allowed foreign investment, among other measures. He also opened up the management of and decision-making within the Soviet Union and allowed greater public discussion and criticism, along with the warming of relationships with the West. These twin policies were known as perestroika (literally meaning "reconstruction", though it varies) and glasnost ("openness" and "transparency"), respectively. The dismantling of the principal defining features of Soviet communism in 1988 and 1989 in the Soviet Union led to the unintended consequence of the Soviet Union breaking up after the failed August 1991 coup led by Gennady Yanayev.

== List of leaders ==
The following list includes those who held the top leadership position of the Soviet Union from its founding in 1922 until its 1991 dissolution. † denotes leaders who died in office.

| Portrait | Name (Lifespan) | Period | Duration | Congress(es) | Political office | Premier(s) | President(s) | Policies |
|---|---|---|---|---|---|---|---|---|
| | Vladimir Lenin (1870–1924) | 30 December 1922 ↓ 21 January 1924† | 1 year, 22 days | 1st–10th (Note: As a revolutionary, then as leader of Soviet Russia.); 11th; 12th | Chairman of Sovnarkom | Himself | Mikhail Kalinin | Leninism • Russian Civil War (1917–23) • War communism (1918–21) • New Economic Policy (1921–28) |
| | Vladimir Lenin (1870–1924) | After the Russian Revolution, Lenin became leader of the Russian Soviet Federative Socialist Republic (RSFSR) in 1917 and leader of the Union of Soviet Socialist Republics (USSR) in 1922. He remained in power until his death. | | | | | | Leninism • Russian Civil War (1917–23) • War communism (1918–21) • New Economic Policy (1921–28) |
| | Joseph Stalin (1878–1953) | 21 January 1924 ↓ 5 March 1953† | 29 years, 43 days | 13th; 14th; 15th; 16th; 17th; 18th; 19th | General Secretary of the Communist Party (1922–1952); Chairman of the Council of Ministers (1941–1953) | Alexei Rykov; Vyacheslav Molotov; Himself | Mikhail Kalinin; Nikolay Shvernik | Stalinism • Socialism in one country • Collectivization (1928–40) • Rapid industrialization (1929–41) • Great Purge (1936–38) |
| | Joseph Stalin (1878–1953) | Following the death of Lenin, Stalin initially ruled the Soviet Union as part of a troika alongside Grigory Zinoviev and Lev Kamenev. However, in April 1925, this arrangement broke down as Stalin consolidated power within the Soviet leadership. By the 1930s, he had successfully purged the regime of all his political rivals, thereby becoming the absolute dictator of the Soviet Union. Following his country's entry into World War II, he chaired the State Defense Committee and held the office of Minister of Defence. | | | | | | Stalinism • Socialism in one country • Collectivization (1928–40) • Rapid industrialization (1929–41) • Great Purge (1936–38) |
| | Georgy Malenkov (1902–1988) | 5 March 1953 ↓ 22 January 1955 | 1 year, 323 days | — | Chairman of the Council of Ministers | Himself | Nikolay Shvernik; Kliment Voroshilov | Post-Stalin Interregnum •"Silent de-Stalinization" •New Course |
| | Georgy Malenkov (1902–1988) | After Joseph Stalin's death on 5 March 1953, Georgy Malenkov succeeded him as the highest-ranking figure in both the state bureaucracy and CPSU Secretariat. Nevertheless, Malenkov was unable to fully consolidate power in the Soviet leadership and therefore governed the country as part of a troika alongside Lavrentiy Beria and Vyacheslav Molotov. By 14 March 1953, the Central Committee Presidium had compelled him to cede control of the party apparatus in favor of Nikita Khrushchev. Following the ruling troika's dissolution upon Beria's arrest in June 1953, Malenkov became locked in a power struggle against Khrushchev for leadership of the regime. By 1955, Khrushchev successfully had him removed as Premier of the Soviet Union and Chairman of the Central Committee Presidium. | | | | | | Post-Stalin Interregnum •"Silent de-Stalinization" •New Course |
| | Nikita Khrushchev (1894–1971) | 22 January 1955 ↓ 14 October 1964 | 11 years, 37 days | 20th; 21st; 22nd | First Secretary of the Communist Party | Georgy Malenkov; Nikolai Bulganin; Himself | Kliment Voroshilov; Leonid Brezhnev; Anastas Mikoyan | Khrushchev Thaw • De-Stalinization (1955–64) • Anti-religious campaign (1958–64) • Sino-Soviet split (1956–66) |
| | Nikita Khrushchev (1894–1971) | Following Georgy Malenkov's removal from the Secretariat on 14 March 1953, Nikita Khrushchev became the acting head of the party apparatus. Later on 7 September 1953, Khrushchev was formally named First Secretary and began openly vying against Malenkov for supremacy within the regime. By 1955, he emerged as first among equals in the Soviet leadership upon forcing Malenkov to step down as Premier and Chairman of the Central Committee Presidium. After foiling an attempted coup in 1957 by the "anti-party group", Khrushchev consolidated power even further by assuming the premiership on 27 March 1958. Ultimately, after alienating colleagues through disruptive shake-ups of the country's infrastructure and brinksmanship on the world stage, he was fired from all his posts at a special meeting of the Presidium on 13 October 1964. | | | | | | Khrushchev Thaw • De-Stalinization (1955–64) • Anti-religious campaign (1958–64) • Sino-Soviet split (1956–66) |
| | Leonid Brezhnev (1906–1982) | 14 October 1964 ↓ 10 November 1982† | 18 years, 27 days | 23rd; 24th; 25th; 26th | General Secretary of the Communist Party | Alexei Kosygin; Nikolai Tikhonov | Anastas Mikoyan; Nikolai Podgorny; Himself | Era of Stagnation • Collective leadership • Kosygin reforms (1965–70) • Brezhnev Doctrine (1968–81) • Cold War détente (1969–79) • 1973 economic reform • 1979 economic reform |
| | Leonid Brezhnev (1906–1982) | In October 1964, Brezhnev replaced Khrushchev as First Secretary of the Communist Party. Despite being the de jure head of the party, he initially governed the country as part of a troika alongside the Soviet Union's Premier, Alexei Kosygin and Chairman of the Supreme Soviet's Presidium, Nikolai Podgorny. However, by the 1970s, Brezhnev consolidated power to become the regime's undisputed leader. In 1977, Brezhnev officially replaced Podgorny as head of state. At his death in 1982, he received a state funeral. | | | | | | Era of Stagnation • Collective leadership • Kosygin reforms (1965–70) • Brezhnev Doctrine (1968–81) • Cold War détente (1969–79) • 1973 economic reform • 1979 economic reform |
| | Yuri Andropov (1914–1984) | 10 November 1982 ↓ 9 February 1984† | 1 year, 91 days | — | General Secretary of the Communist Party | Nikolai Tikhonov | Vasily Kuznetsov (acting); Himself | Era of Stagnation • Collective leadership • Kosygin reforms (1965–70) • Brezhnev Doctrine (1968–81) • Cold War détente (1969–79) • 1973 economic reform • 1979 economic reform |
| | Yuri Andropov (1914–1984) | General Secretary of the Central Committee of the Communist Party and Chairman of the Presidium from 16 June 1983 to 9 February 1984. | | | | | | Era of Stagnation • Collective leadership • Kosygin reforms (1965–70) • Brezhnev Doctrine (1968–81) • Cold War détente (1969–79) • 1973 economic reform • 1979 economic reform |
| | Konstantin Chernenko (1911–1985) | 9 February 1984 ↓ 10 March 1985† | 1 year, 29 days | — | General Secretary of the Communist Party | Nikolai Tikhonov | Vasily Kuznetsov (acting); Himself | Era of Stagnation • Collective leadership • Kosygin reforms (1965–70) • Brezhnev Doctrine (1968–81) • Cold War détente (1969–79) • 1973 economic reform • 1979 economic reform |
| | Konstantin Chernenko (1911–1985) | General Secretary of the Central Committee of the Communist Party and Chairman of the Presidium from 11 April 1984 to 10 March 1985. However, due to his poor health and lack of support within the party, he governed the country for most of his tenure as part of a troika alongside Andrei Gromyko and Dmitry Ustinov. | | | | | | Era of Stagnation • Collective leadership • Kosygin reforms (1965–70) • Brezhnev Doctrine (1968–81) • Cold War détente (1969–79) • 1973 economic reform • 1979 economic reform |
| | Mikhail Gorbachev (1931–2022) | 10 March 1985 ↓ 25 December 1991 | 6 years, 290 days | 27th; 28th | President (1990–1991); General Secretary of the Communist Party | Nikolai Tikhonov; Nikolai Ryzhkov; Valentin Pavlov; Ivan Silayev | Vasily Kuznetsov (acting); Andrei Gromyko; Himself | Perestroika • Glasnost • Uskoreniye • Democratization • New political thinking • 500 Days Program (planned) |
| | Mikhail Gorbachev (1931–2022) | Served as General Secretary from 11 March 1985 and resigned on 24 August 1991, (Note: On 14 March 1990, the provision on the CPSU monopoly on power was removed from Article 6 of the Constitution of the USSR. Thus, in the Soviet Union, a multi-party system was officially allowed and the CPSU ceased to be part of the state apparatus.) Chairman of the Presidium of the Supreme Soviet from 1 October 1988 until the office was renamed to the Chairman of the Supreme Soviet on 25 May 1989 to 15 March 1990 and President of the Soviet Union from 15 March 1990 to 25 December 1991. Deposed on 19 August 1991, reinstated on 22 August. The day following Gorbachev's resignation as president, the Soviet Union was formally dissolved. Gorbachev was the only head of the USSR to have been born during its existence. | | | | | | Perestroika • Glasnost • Uskoreniye • Democratization • New political thinking • 500 Days Program (planned) |

== List of troikas ==
Over the course of the Soviet Union's existence, there were four intervals where the country was ruled not by one figure but a troika (i.e."triumvirate") comprising three leading figures within the Politburo. Such instances included: (1) the 2- to 3-year period between Lenin's incapacitation and the rise of Joseph Stalin; (2) the 3 months immediately following Stalin's death; (3) the years between Nikita Khrushchev's fall and Leonid Brezhnev's consolidation of power; and (4) the ailing Konstantin Chernenko's tenure as de jure leader of the Soviet Union.

| Members (Lifespan) | | | Tenure | Duration | Notes |
|---|---|---|---|---|---|
| | | | May 1922 ↓ April 1925 | 2 years, 11 months | When Lenin suffered his first stroke in May 1922, a troika was formed to temporarily rule in his place consisting of Deputy Premier Lev Kamenev, General Secretary Joseph Stalin and Comintern Chairman Grigory Zinoviev. In March 1923, the three assumed permanent control over the country after Lenin suffered another stroke, leaving him unable to govern. However, by April 1925, the triumvirate broke up due to Kamenev's and Zinoviev's opposition to Stalin's "Socialism in One Country" policy. After Stalin had consolidated his dictatorship of the Soviet Union by the 1930s, Kamenev and Zinoviev were murdered in the Great Purge. |
| Lev; Kamenev (1883–1936) | Joseph; Stalin (1878–1953) | Grigory; Zinoviev (1883–1936) | May 1922 ↓ April 1925 | 2 years, 11 months | |
| | | | 13 March 1953 ↓ 26 June 1953 | 105 days | After Stalin's death on 5 March 1953, a troika assumed power consisting of Council of Ministers Chairman Georgy Malenkov, Minister of Internal Affairs Lavrentiy Beria and Foreign Minister Vyacheslav Molotov. It dissolved after Beria was arrested and dismissed from the leadership on 26 June 1953. Thereafter, a power struggle ensued between Malenkov and the First Secretary of the Communist Party, Nikita Khrushchev, that ended decisively in the latter's favor by 1955. |
| Lavrentiy; Beria (1899–1953) | Georgy; Malenkov (1902–1988) | Vyacheslav; Molotov (1890–1986) | 13 March 1953 ↓ 26 June 1953 | 105 days | After Stalin's death on 5 March 1953, a troika assumed power consisting of Council of Ministers Chairman Georgy Malenkov, Minister of Internal Affairs Lavrentiy Beria and Foreign Minister Vyacheslav Molotov. It dissolved after Beria was arrested and dismissed from the leadership on 26 June 1953. Thereafter, a power struggle ensued between Malenkov and the First Secretary of the Communist Party, Nikita Khrushchev, that ended decisively in the latter's favor by 1955. |
| | | | 14 October 1964 ↓ 16 June 1977 | 12 years, 245 days | After Khrushchev's ousting in 1964, he was replaced by a troika comprising Leonid Brezhnev as First/General Secretary, Alexei Kosygin as Premier and CC Secretary Nikolai Podgorny who went on to become Chairman of the Presidium of the Supreme Soviet in 1965. However, as Brezhnev increasingly consolidated power within the regime, the troika's effectiveness as a guarantor of collective leadership steadily declined. It was ultimately dissolved in 1977 after Brezhnev took Podgorny's place as head of state. |
| Leonid; Brezhnev (1906–1982) | Alexei; Kosygin (1904–1980) | Nikolai; Podgorny (1903–1983) | 14 October 1964 ↓ 16 June 1977 | 12 years, 245 days | |
| | | | 13 February 1984 ↓ 20 December 1984 | 311 days | Despite succeeding Andropov as the de jure leader of the Soviet Union, Chernenko was unable to decisively consolidate power due to his poor health and lack of popularity among the party elite. This compelled him to govern the country as part of a troika alongside Foreign Minister Andrei Gromyko and Defense Minister Dmitry Ustinov. This arrangement lasted until Ustinov's death in December 1984 which made way for Mikhail Gorbachev's rise to power in March 1985. |
| Konstantin; Chernenko (1911–1985) | Andrei; Gromyko (1909–1989) | Dmitry; Ustinov (1908–1984) | 13 February 1984 ↓ 20 December 1984 | 311 days | Despite succeeding Andropov as the de jure leader of the Soviet Union, Chernenko was unable to decisively consolidate power due to his poor health and lack of popularity among the party elite. This compelled him to govern the country as part of a troika alongside Foreign Minister Andrei Gromyko and Defense Minister Dmitry Ustinov. This arrangement lasted until Ustinov's death in December 1984 which made way for Mikhail Gorbachev's rise to power in March 1985. |

== See also ==
- List of heads of state of the Soviet Union
- Premier of the Soviet Union
