= Israfil Abbaslı =

Azerbaijani scientist (1938–2013)

- Born: 1 February 1938; Erivan, Armenian SSR Soviet Union
- Died: 24 March 2013 (aged 75); Baku, Azerbaijan
- Occupations: Philologist and literary historian

Israfil Ismail oglu Abbasli (Azerbaijani: İsrafil İsmayıl oğlu Abbaslı; b. 1 February 1938, Erivan, Armenian SSR - d. 24 March 2013, Baku, Azerbaijan) was a prominent Azerbaijani scientist, Doctor of Philology, and professor.

== Life ==
Israfil Abbasly was born on February 1, 1938, in the city of Yerevan, Armenian SSR. Graduated from the Faculty of History and Philology of the Armenian State Pedagogical University named after Khachatur Abovian. He worked as head of the Azerbaijani folklore department at the Institute of Folklore of ANAS.

== Scientific activity ==
The scientist’s field of activity was the dissemination of Azerbaijani folklore, identifying the area of influence of dastans, studying the characteristics of scientific directions, and preparing folklore publications in foreign languages.

They have participated in the preparation of a series of fundamental publications and are one of the authors of the main articles in the 6 volumes of the 10-volume Azerbaijani Soviet Encyclopedia. They have also worked as a compiler, editor, author of prefaces, explanations, and notes for multiple multi-volume works such as "Azerbaijani Classical Literature Library," "Treasures of Azerbaijani Literature," "World Children's Literature," "Anthology of Azerbaijani Folklore." In recent years, they have served as the deputy editor for the first volume of the six-volume "History of Azerbaijani Literature" and have authored several introductions in that volume. Abbasli was the author of 160 scientific works and two monographs. Under the leadership of Abbasli, seven candidates and two doctors of science defended their dissertations.

== Selected scientific works ==
His most well-known works are:

- Аббаслы, Исрафил; Б, Абдулла; Noonan, David (2000). Короглу [Koroglu]. Baku: Səda. pp. 198–203.
- Исрафил, Аббаслы (2001). Ареал распространения и влияния Азербайджанских дастанов [Area of distribution and influence of Azerbaijani dastans]. Baku: Səda.
- Abbasli, Israfil (2002). Azərbaycan dastanlarının yayılması və təsiri məsələləri [Issues of spread and impact of Azerbaijani epics]. Baku: Nurlan.
- Abbasli, Israfil (2002). Folklorşünaslıq axtarışları [Folklore searches]. Baku: Nurlan.
- Аббаслы, Исрафил. Из истории перевода, обработки и издания азербайджанских дастанов на армянском языке [From the history of translation, processing and publication of Azerbaijani dastans in Armenian]. Baku.
