= Collective leadership in the Soviet Union =

Form of governance in the USSR

Collective leadership (Russian: коллективное руководство, kollektivnoye rukovodstvo), or collectivity of leadership (Russian: коллективность руководства, kollektivnost rukovodstva), became - alongside doctrine such as democratic centralism - official dogma for governance in the Union of Soviet Socialist Republics (USSR) and other socialist states espousing communism. In the Soviet Union itself, the collective leadership concept operated by distributing powers and functions among members of the Politburo and the Central Committee of the Communist Party of the Soviet Union, as well as the Council of Ministers, to hinder any attempts to create a one-man dominance over the Soviet political system by a Soviet leader, such as that seen under Joseph Stalin's rule between the late 1920s and 1953. On the national level, the heart of the collective leadership was officially the Central Committee of the Communist Party. Collective leadership was characterised by limiting the powers of the General Secretary of the Communist Party and the Chairman of the Council of Ministers as related to other offices by enhancing the powers of collective bodies, such as the Politburo.

Collective leadership became institutionalised in the upper levels of control in the Soviet Union following Stalin's death in March 1953, and subsequent Soviet Communist Party leaders ruled as part of a collective. First Secretary Nikita Khrushchev criticized Stalin's dictatorial rule at the 20th Party Congress in 1956, but Khrushchev's own increasingly erratic decisions led to his ouster in 1964. The Party replaced Khrushchev in his posts with Leonid Brezhnev as First Secretary and with Alexei Kosygin as Premier. Though Brezhnev gained more and more prominence over his colleagues, he retained the Politburo's support by consulting its members on all policies. Collective leadership continued under Yuri Andropov (General Secretary from 1982 to 1984) and Konstantin Chernenko (General Secretary from 1984 to 1985). Mikhail Gorbachev's reforms espoused open discussion from about 1986, leading to members of the leadership openly disagreeing on how little or how much reform was needed to rejuvenate the Soviet system.

== History ==
=== Early years ===
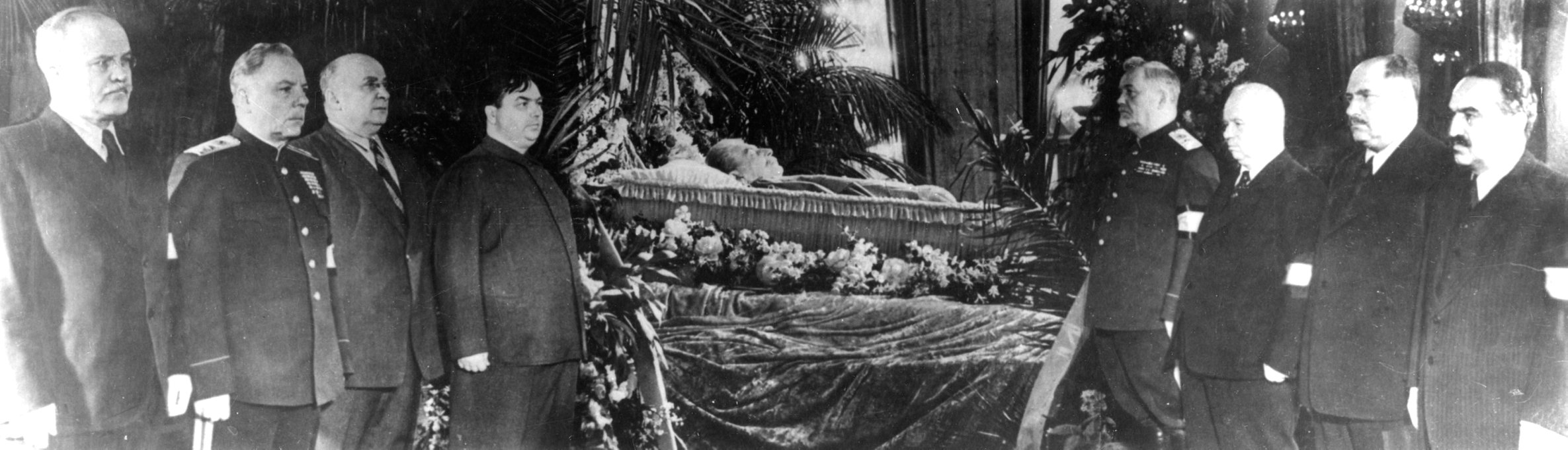
(L-R) Molotov, Voroshilov, Beria, Malenkov, Bulganin, Khrushchev, Kaganovich and Mikoyan, the eight members of the collective leadership, at Stalin´s bier in 1953.

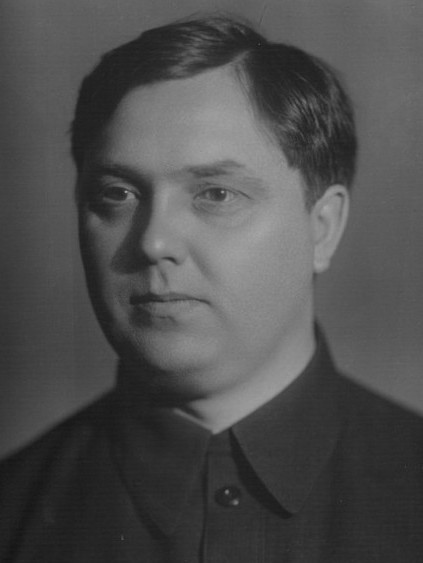
Georgy Malenkov, the Premier of the Soviet Union, emerged as one of the major contenders for the Soviet leadership in 1953, but lost to Khrushchev in 1955.

According to Stalin's secretary, Boris Bazhanov, Lenin “in general leaned towards a collegial leadership, with Trotsky in the first position”. Historian Paul Le Blanc referenced various scholars which included E.H. Carr, Isaac Deutscher, Moshe Lewin, Ronald Suny and W. Bruce Lincoln that on balance tilted “toward the view that Lenin’s desired 'heir' was collective responsibility in which Trotsky placed an important role and within which Stalin would be dramatically demoted (if not removed)".

Marxist Leninist ideologists believed that Lenin, the first Soviet leader, thought that only collective leadership could protect the Party from serious mistakes. Joseph Stalin, who consolidated his power after Lenin's death in 1924, promoted these values; however, instead of creating a new collective leadership, he built up a leadership centered around himself.

After Stalin's death (5 March 1953), his successors, while vying for control over the Soviet leadership, promoted the values of collective leadership. The collective leadership included the following eight senior members of the Presidium of the Central Committee of the Communist Party of the Soviet Union, listed according to the order of precedence presented formally on 5 March 1953: Georgy Malenkov, Lavrentiy Beria, Vyacheslav Molotov, Kliment Voroshilov, Nikita Khrushchev, Nikolai Bulganin, Lazar Kaganovich and Anastas Mikoyan. Amongst them Malenkov, Beria and Molotov formed an unofficial Triumvirate (also known by its Russian name Troika) immediately after Stalin's death, but it collapsed when Malenkov and Molotov turned on Beria. After the arrest of Beria (26 June 1953), Nikita Khrushchev proclaimed collective leadership as the "supreme principle of our Party". He further stated that only decisions approved by the Central Committee (CC) could ensure good leadership for the party and the country. Khrushchev used these ideas so that he could win enough support to remove his opponents from power, most notably Premier Malenkov, who resigned in February 1955.

During the 20th Congress of the Communist Party of the Soviet Union Khrushchev criticised Stalin's rule and his "cult of personality". He accused Stalin of reducing the Party's activities and putting an end to Party democracy among others. In the three years following Stalin's death, the Central Committee and the Presidium (Politburo) worked consistently to uphold the collective leadership lost under Stalin. Khrushchev's rule as First Secretary remained highly controversial throughout his rule in the Party leadership. The first attempt to depose Khrushchev came in 1957, when the so-called Anti-Party Group accused him of individualistic leadership. The coup failed, but Khrushchev's position weakened drastically. However, Khrushchev continued to portray his regime as a "rule of the collective" even after becoming Chairman of the Council of Ministers (Premier), replacing Nikolai Bulganin.

Official order of precedence (according to 5 March 1953 amendment)
| Portrait | Information | | Party position(s) | State position(s) |
|---|---|---|---|---|
| Georgy Malenkov | Rank | 1st | Informally the Party's first amongst equals, literally first secretary | Chairman of the Council of Ministers |
| Georgy Malenkov | Name | Georgy Malenkov | Informally the Party's first amongst equals, literally first secretary | Chairman of the Council of Ministers |
| Georgy Malenkov | Birthdate | 8 January 1902 | Informally the Party's first amongst equals, literally first secretary | Chairman of the Council of Ministers |
| Georgy Malenkov | Birthplace | Orenburg, Orenburg Oblast | Informally the Party's first amongst equals, literally first secretary | Chairman of the Council of Ministers |
| Georgy Malenkov | Deathdate | 14 January 1988 | Informally the Party's first amongst equals, literally first secretary | Chairman of the Council of Ministers |
| Lavrentiy Beria | Rank | 2nd | | First Deputy Chairman of the Council of Ministers; Minister of Internal Affairs |
| Lavrentiy Beria | Name | Lavrentiy Beria | | First Deputy Chairman of the Council of Ministers; Minister of Internal Affairs |
| Lavrentiy Beria | Birthdate | 29 March 1899 | | First Deputy Chairman of the Council of Ministers; Minister of Internal Affairs |
| Lavrentiy Beria | Birthplace | Merkheuli, Sukhumi | | First Deputy Chairman of the Council of Ministers; Minister of Internal Affairs |
| Lavrentiy Beria | Deathdate | 23 December 1953 | | First Deputy Chairman of the Council of Ministers; Minister of Internal Affairs |
| Vyacheslav Molotov | Rank | 3rd | | First Deputy Chairman of the Council of Ministers; Minister of Foreign Affairs |
| Vyacheslav Molotov | Name | Vyacheslav Molotov | | First Deputy Chairman of the Council of Ministers; Minister of Foreign Affairs |
| Vyacheslav Molotov | Birthdate | 9 March 1890 | | First Deputy Chairman of the Council of Ministers; Minister of Foreign Affairs |
| Vyacheslav Molotov | Birthplace | Kukarka, Kirov Oblast | | First Deputy Chairman of the Council of Ministers; Minister of Foreign Affairs |
| Vyacheslav Molotov | Deathdate | 8 November 1986 | | First Deputy Chairman of the Council of Ministers; Minister of Foreign Affairs |
| Kliment Voroshilov | Rank | 4th | | Chairman of the Presidium of the Supreme Soviet |
| Kliment Voroshilov | Name | Kliment Voroshilov | | Chairman of the Presidium of the Supreme Soviet |
| Kliment Voroshilov | Birthdate | 4 February 1881 | | Chairman of the Presidium of the Supreme Soviet |
| Kliment Voroshilov | Birthplace | Lysychansk, Luhansk Oblast | | Chairman of the Presidium of the Supreme Soviet |
| Kliment Voroshilov | Deathdate | 2 December 1969 | | Chairman of the Presidium of the Supreme Soviet |
| Nikita Khrushchev | Rank | 5th | Informally the Party's Second Secretary | |
| Nikita Khrushchev | Name | Nikita Khrushchev | Informally the Party's Second Secretary | |
| Nikita Khrushchev | Birthdate | 15 April 1894 | Informally the Party's Second Secretary | |
| Nikita Khrushchev | Birthplace | Kalinovka, Kursk Oblast | Informally the Party's Second Secretary | |
| Nikita Khrushchev | Deathdate | 11 September 1971 | Informally the Party's Second Secretary | |
| Nikolai Bulganin | Rank | 6th | | Minister of Defence |
| Nikolai Bulganin | Name | Nikolai Bulganin | | Minister of Defence |
| Nikolai Bulganin | Birthdate | 30 March 1895 | | Minister of Defence |
| Nikolai Bulganin | Birthplace | Nizhny Novgorod, Nizhny Novgorod Oblast | | Minister of Defence |
| Nikolai Bulganin | Deathdate | 24 February 1975 | | Minister of Defence |
| Lazar Kaganovich | Rank | 7th | | First Deputy Chairman of the Council of Ministers |
| Lazar Kaganovich | Name | Lazar Kaganovich | | First Deputy Chairman of the Council of Ministers |
| Lazar Kaganovich | Birthdate | 22 November 1893 | | First Deputy Chairman of the Council of Ministers |
| Lazar Kaganovich | Birthplace | Kabany, near Kiev | | First Deputy Chairman of the Council of Ministers |
| Lazar Kaganovich | Deathdate | 25 July 1991 | | First Deputy Chairman of the Council of Ministers |
| Anastas Mikoyan | Rank | 8th | | Minister of Foreign Trade |
| Anastas Mikoyan | Name | Anastas Mikoyan | | Minister of Foreign Trade |
| Anastas Mikoyan | Birthdate | 25 November 1895 | | Minister of Foreign Trade |
| Anastas Mikoyan | Birthplace | Sanahin | | Minister of Foreign Trade |
| Anastas Mikoyan | Deathdate | 21 October 1978 | | Minister of Foreign Trade |
| | Rank | 9th | | Minister of Machine Building; Chairman of the State Planning Committee |
| | Name | Maksim Saburov | | Minister of Machine Building; Chairman of the State Planning Committee |
| | Birthdate | 2 February 1900 | | Minister of Machine Building; Chairman of the State Planning Committee |
| | Birthplace | Druzhkivka | | Minister of Machine Building; Chairman of the State Planning Committee |
| | Deathdate | 24 March 1977 | | Minister of Machine Building; Chairman of the State Planning Committee |
| | Rank | 10th | | |
| | Name | Mikhail Pervukhin | | |
| | Birthdate | 14 October 1904 | | |
| | Birthplace | Yuryuzansky Zavod | | |
| | Deathdate | 22 July 1978 | | |

=== Collectivity of leadership ===
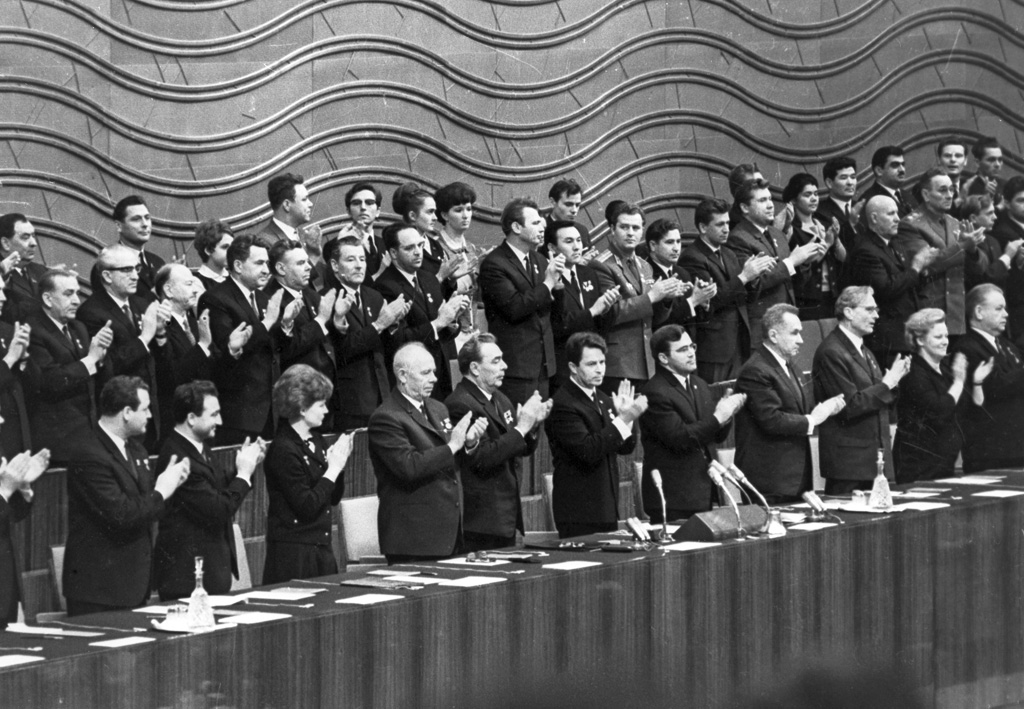
Brezhnev (center with Nikolai Podgorny) among the members of the Presidium of the Supreme Soviet of the USSR

Most Western observers believed that Khrushchev had become the supreme leader of the Soviet Union by the early 1960s, even if this was far from the truth. The Presidium, which had grown to resent Khrushchev's leadership style and feared Mao Zedong's one-man dominance and the growing cult of personality in the People's Republic of China, began an aggressive campaign against Khrushchev in 1963. This campaign culminated in 1964 with the replacement of Khrushchev in his offices of First Secretary by Leonid Brezhnev and of Chairman of the Council of Ministers by Alexei Kosygin. Brezhnev and Kosygin, along with Mikhail Suslov, Andrei Kirilenko and Anastas Mikoyan (replaced in 1965 by Nikolai Podgorny), were elected to their respective offices to form and lead a functioning collective leadership.

One of the reasons for Khrushchev's ousting, as Suslov told him, was his violation of collective leadership. With Khrushchev's removal, collective leadership was again praised by the Soviet media as a return to "Leninist norms of Party life". At the plenum which ousted Khrushchev, the Central Committee forbade any single individual to hold the office of General Secretary and Premier simultaneously.

The leadership was usually referred to as the "Brezhnev–Kosygin" leadership, instead of the collective leadership, by First World medias. At first, there was no clear leader of the collective leadership, and Kosygin was the chief economic administrator, whereas Brezhnev was primarily responsible for the day-to-day management of the party and internal affairs. Kosygin's position was later weakened when he introduced a reform in 1965 that attempted to decentralise the Soviet economy. The reform led to a backlash, with Kosygin losing supporters because many top officials took an increasingly anti-reformist stance due to the Prague Spring of 1968. As a result, after 1968 Brezhnev was ranked first in the Politburo hierarchy, followed by Podgorny, Kosygin, Suslov and Kirilenko as the top five-ranked members of Politburo.

As the years passed, Brezhnev was given more and more prominence, and by the 1970s he had even created a "Secretariat of the General Secretary" to strengthen his position within the Party. At the 25th Party Congress, Brezhnev was, according to an anonymous historian, praised in a way that exceeded the praise accorded to Khrushchev before his removal. Brezhnev was able to retain the Politburo's support by not introducing the same sweeping reform measures as seen during Khrushchev's rule. As noted by foreign officials, Brezhnev felt obliged to discuss unanticipated proposals with the Politburo before responding to them.

=== Later years ===
As Brezhnev's health worsened during the late 1970s, the collective leadership became even more collective. Brezhnev's death did not alter the balance of power in any radical fashion, and Yuri Andropov and Konstantin Chernenko were obliged by protocol to rule the country in the very same fashion as Brezhnev. When Mikhail Gorbachev was elected to the position of General Secretary in March 1985, some observers wondered if he could be the leader to overcome the restraints of the collective leadership. Gorbachev's reform agenda had succeeded in altering the Soviet political system for good; however, this change made him some enemies. Many of Gorbachev's closest allies disagreed with him on what reforms were needed, or how radical they should be.

== Analysis ==
=== Soviet assessments ===
According to Soviet literature, the Central Committee and not the Politburo was the heart of collective leadership at the national level. At a sub-national level, all Party and Government organs were to work together to ensure collective leadership instead of only the Central Committee. However, as with many other ideological theses, the definition of collective leadership was applied "flexibly to a variety of situations". Making Lenin the example of a ruler ruling in favour of a collective can be seen as proof of this "flexibility". In some Soviet ideological drafts, collective leadership can be compared to collegial leadership instead of a leadership of the collective. In accordance with a Soviet textbook, collective leadership was:

The regular convocations of Party congresses and plenary sessions of the Central Committee, regular meetings of all electoral organs of the party, general public discussion of the major issues of state, economic and party development, extensive consultation with persons employed in various branches of the economy and cultural life...."

In contrast to fascism, which advocates one-man dominance, Leninism advocates inner-Party democratic collective leadership. Hence, the ideological justification of collective leadership in the Soviet Union was easy to justify. The physical insecurity of the political leadership under Stalin, and the political insecurity that existed during Khrushchev's reign, strengthened the political leadership's will to ensure a rule of the collective, and not that of the individual. Collective leadership was a value that was highly esteemed during Stalin and Khrushchev's reigns, but it was violated in practice.

=== Outside observers ===
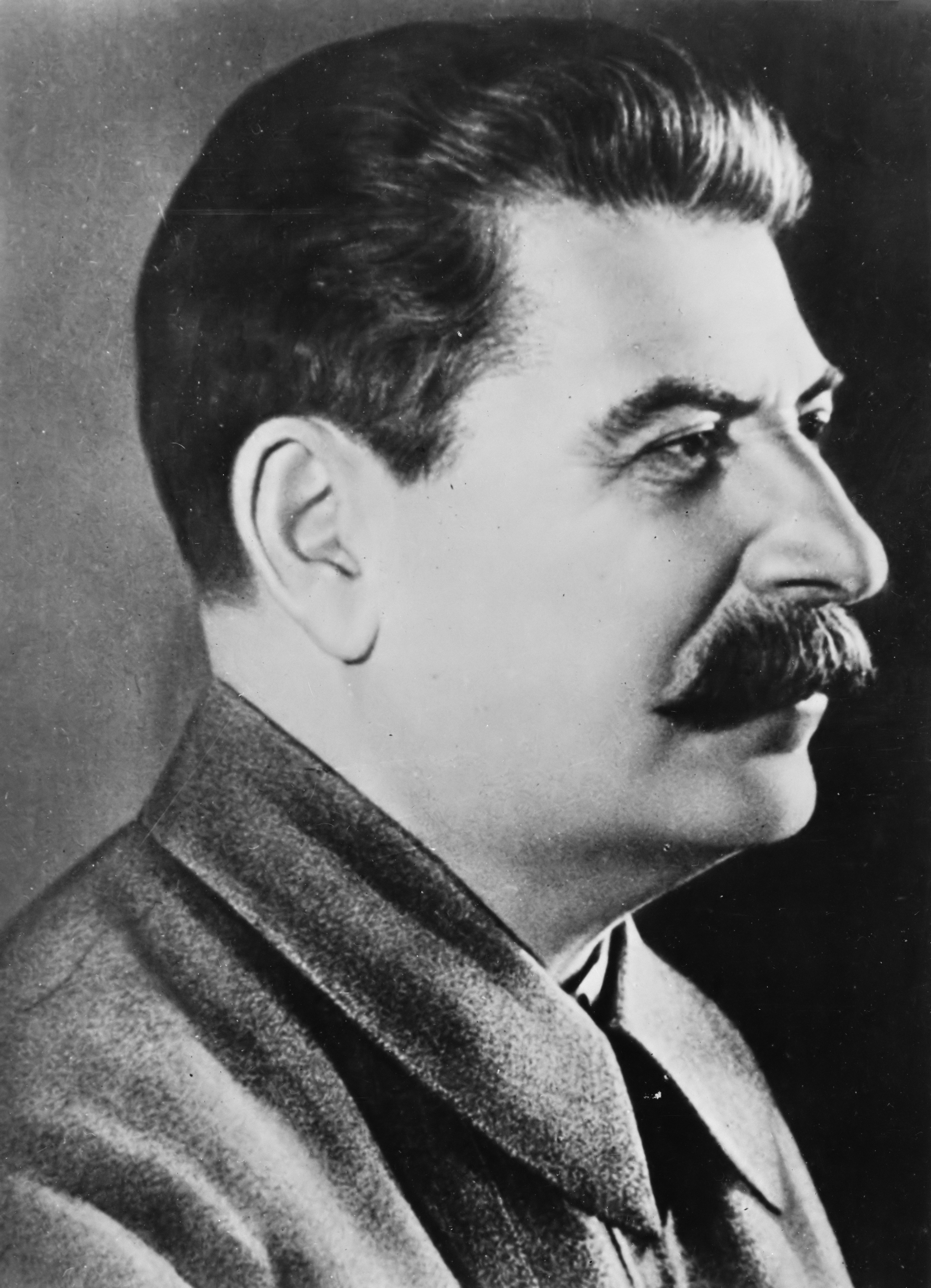
Stalin's rule was considered by post-Stalin-era Soviet ideologists as one that disrupted collective decision-making and promoted the cult of the individual.

Richard Löwenthal, a German professor, believed that the Soviet Union had evolved from being a totalitarian state under the rule of Joseph Stalin into a system that he called "post-totalitarian authoritarianism", or "authoritarian bureaucratic oligarchy", in which the Soviet state remained omnipotent in theory and highly authoritarian in practice. However, it did considerably reduce the scale of repression and allowed a much greater level of pluralism into public life. In a 1960 paper, Löwenthal wrote that one-man leadership was "the normal rule of line in a one-party state". The majority of First World observers tended to agree with Löwenthal on the grounds that a collective leadership in an authoritarian state was "inherently unworkable" in practice, claiming that a collective leadership would sooner or later always give in for one-man rule. In a different interpretation, the Soviet Union was seen to go into periods of "oligarchy" and "limited-personal rule". Oligarchy, in the sense that no individual could "prevent the adoption of policies in which he may be opposed", was seen as an unstable form of government. "Limited-personal rule", in contrast with Joseph Stalin's "personal rule", was a type of governance in which major policy-making decision could not be made without the consent of the leader, while the leader had to tolerate some opposition to his policies and to his leadership in general.

The historian T. H. Rigby claimed that the Soviet leadership was setting up checks and balances within the Party to ensure the stability of collective leadership. One anonymous historian went so far as to claim that collective leadership was bound to triumph in any future Soviet political system. Professor Jerome Gilison argued that collective leadership had become the "normal" ruling pattern of the Soviet Union. He argued that the Party had successfully set up checks and balances to ensure the continuity of the Soviet leadership. Khrushchev's rule was, according to Gilison, proof that the one-man dominance in Soviet politics had ended. As he noted, Khrushchev "was forced to retreat from unceremoniously from previously stated positions". The "grey men" of the party bureaucracy, Gilison believed, were to become the future Soviet leaders. Dennis Ross, an American diplomat, believed the late Brezhnev-era leadership had evolved into a "rule by committee", pointing to several collective Politburo decisions as evidence. Grey Hodnett, another analyst, believed that "freer communication" and "access to relevant official information" during the Brezhnev Era had contributed to strengthening the Politburo's collective leadership.

According to Thomas A. Baylis, the author of Governing by Committee: Collegial Leadership in Advanced Societies, the existence of collective leadership was due to the individual Politburo members enhancing their own positions by strengthening the collective. Ellen Jones, an educator, noted how each Politburo member specialised in his own field and acted as that field's spokesman in the Politburo. Therefore, collective leadership was divided into Party and Government institutional and organisational lines. The dominant faction, Jones believed, acted as a "coalition" government of several social forces. This development led some to believe that the Soviet Union had evolved into neo-corporatism. Some believed Soviet factionalism to be "feudal in character". Personal relationship were created to ensure service and support. "Personal factionalism", as Baylis calls it, could either strengthen or weaken the collective leadership's majority.

Robert Osborn wrote in 1974 that collective leadership did not necessarily mean that the Central Committee, Politburo and the Council of Ministers were political equals without a clear leading figure. Baylis believed that the post of General Secretary could be compared to the office of prime minister in the Westminster system. The General Secretary in the Soviet political system acted as the leading broker in Politburo sessions and could be considered "the Party leader" due to his negotiation skills and successful tactics which retained the Politburo's support. In other words, the General Secretary needed to retain Politburo consensus if he wanted to remain in office.

== See also ==
- Politburo Standing Committee of the Chinese Communist Party
- Presidium of the Politburo of the Workers' Party of Korea
- Four pillars (Vietnam)

== Sources ==
- Baylis, Thomas A. (1989). Governing by Committee: Collegial Leadership in Advanced Societies. State University of New York Press. ISBN 978-0-88706-944-4.
- Cocks, Paul; Daniels, Robert Vincent; Whittier Heer, Nancy (1976). The Dynamics of Soviet Politics. Harvard University Press. ISBN 978-0-674-21881-9.
- Christian, David (1997). Imperial and Soviet Russia: Power, Privilege, and the Challenge of Modernity. Palgrave Macmillan. ISBN 978-0-312-17352-4.
- Law, David A. (1975). Russian Civilization. Ardent Media. ISBN 978-0-8422-0529-0.
- Ra'anan, Uri, ed. (2006). Flawed Succession: Russia's Power Transfer Crises. Oxford: Lexington Books. ISBN 978-0-7391-1403-2.
- Taras, Roy (1989). Leadership Change in Communist States. Routledge. ISBN 978-0-04-445277-5.
- Taubman, William (2003). Khrushchev: The Man and His Era. W.W. Norton & Company. ISBN 0-393-32484-2.
