= Iroda Aliyeva =

Uzbek-Soviet theater and cinema actress

Iroda Mirzaxonovna Aliyeva
- Born: December 17, 1929; Tashkent, Uzbek SFSR, Soviet Union
- Died: July 7, 1989 (aged 59); Tashkent, Uzbek SFSR, Soviet Union
- Occupations: Theater and cinema actress
- Years active: 1951 – 1989

Iroda Mirzaxonovna Aliyeva (Note: Uzbek: Iroda Aliyeva; Russian: Ирода Мирзахоновна Алиева, romanized: Iroda Mirzakhonovna Aliyeva) (December 17, 1929 – July 7, 1989) was an Uzbek-Soviet theater and cinema actress. In 1967 she was awarded the title People's Artist of the Uzbek SSR.

== Life ==
Iroda Aliyeva was born on December 17, 1929, in Tashkent. She graduated from the Theater and Art Institute named after Alexander Ostrovsky in Tashkent. In 1951, she worked at the Tashkent Drama Theater named after Hamza under the guidance of the People's Artist of the USSR Sora Eshontorayeva. The first notable role of Aliyeva was the role of Olga Ulyanova in Popova's play “The Family”. Among other roles - Nasiba (in the comedy “Sick Teeth” by Abdulla Qahhor), Muqaddas (“The True Love” by Odil Yoqubov), Shirin (“The Legend of Love” by Nazim Hikmet), Marjam (“Algeria - My Country” by Mohammed Dib) etc.

From 1960 to 1970, she became one of the influential actresses of the Uzbek theater; she played the role of Asal in the performance “The Lonely Beauty” by Chingiz Aitmatov, Nazokat in the play “Parvona” by Uygun. The images created by Aliyeva were characterized by the understanding of the author's idea, the intellectual depth, the beauty and brightness, while maintaining the warmth, kindness and charm. In 1967, she was awarded the honorary title of People's Artist of the Uzbek Soviet Socialist Republic. Since 1970, she also performed roles in cinema, especially in the studio “Uzbekfilm”; in particular, she is known outside the republic for the role of the witch Almauz-Kampir in the children's films Akmal, Dragon and Princess (1981) and The New Akmal's Adventures (1983), was filmed in episodes of pictures “Once Alone” (1974), “The Pirates of the XX Century” (1979), “The Youth of the Genius” (1982). With a gentle and sonorous voice, the actress played in the radio plays and took part in the dubbing of several hundred films in Uzbek.

She died in Tashkent on July 7, 1989.
