= Fuad Seyidzadeh =

Azerbaijani architect (1938–1972)

Fuad Bagir Seyidzadeh
- Born: 1938; Baku, Azerbaijan SSR, Soviet Union
- Died: 1972 (aged 33–34); Baku, Azerbaijan SSR, Soviet Union
- Children: 2

Fuad Bagir Seyidzadeh (Azerbaijani: Fuad Seyidzadə) (1938 – 1972) was an Azerbaijani architect, co-author of the monument to the 77th Simferopol infantry division on the slope of Sapun mountain, Baku restaurant in Leningrad, and the author of numerous projects in the Baku mikrorayons.

Fuad was the son of an acclaimed Azerbaijani public figure, diplomat, journalist, honorary culture worker of the Azerbaijani SSR, Bagir Seidzade (Azerbaijani: Bağır Mirqasım oğlu Seyidzadə, Russian: Багир Миргасым оглы Сеидзаде) and the brother of Dilara Seyizade ( Azerbaijani : Dilarə Seyidzadə, Russian: Дилара Сеидзаде) as well as Xoshgadam Seyidzade (Azerbaijani : Xoşqədəm Seyidzade, Russian: Xошгадам Сеидзаде)

Fuad had a son, Ulvi Seyidzade (Azerbaijani : Ülvi Fuad oğlu Seyidzadə, Russian: Ульви Фуад оглы Сейидзаде) and a daughter.

== Career ==
From 1956 to 1957, Seyidzadeh studied at the Moscow Institute of Architecture. He was admitted to the drawing school as a second year student, proposed by People's Artist Mikayil Abdullayev.

As a qualified architect, Seyidzadeh worked on memorials to the 77th Simferopol infantry division on the slope of Sapun mountain in Sevastopol, alongside sculptor Omar Eldarov. Together with sculptor Tokay Mammadov, he also worked on the Baku restaurant in what was then Leningrad.

He died in Baku in 1972.
