= Tretuk =

Village in Gegharkunik, Armenia

Tretuk Տրետուք
- Location within Armenia Location within Gegharkunik
- Coordinates: 40°14′N 45°51′E
- Country: Armenia
- Province: Gegharkunik
- Municipality: Vardenis

Population (2011)
  - Total: 174
- Time zone: UTC+4 (AMT)

Tretuk (Armenian: Տրետուք) is a village in the Vardenis Municipality of the Gegharkunik Province of Armenia. In 1988-1989 Armenian refugees deported from Azerbaijan settled in the village.
