= Kalinovka, Khomutovsky District, Kursk Oblast =

Selo in Khomutovsky District, Kursk Oblast, Russia

Coordinates: 51°54′N 34°30′E

Kalinovka (Russian: Кали́новка) is a rural locality (a selo) in Khomutovsky District of Kursk Oblast, Russia, located about 11 kilometers (6.8 mi) east of the border with Ukraine and only 3 kilometers (1.9 mi) from the M3 highway. Kalinovka is known for being the birthplace of Nikita Khrushchev (1894–1971).
