= Death and state funeral of Joseph Stalin =

Death of the second Soviet leader

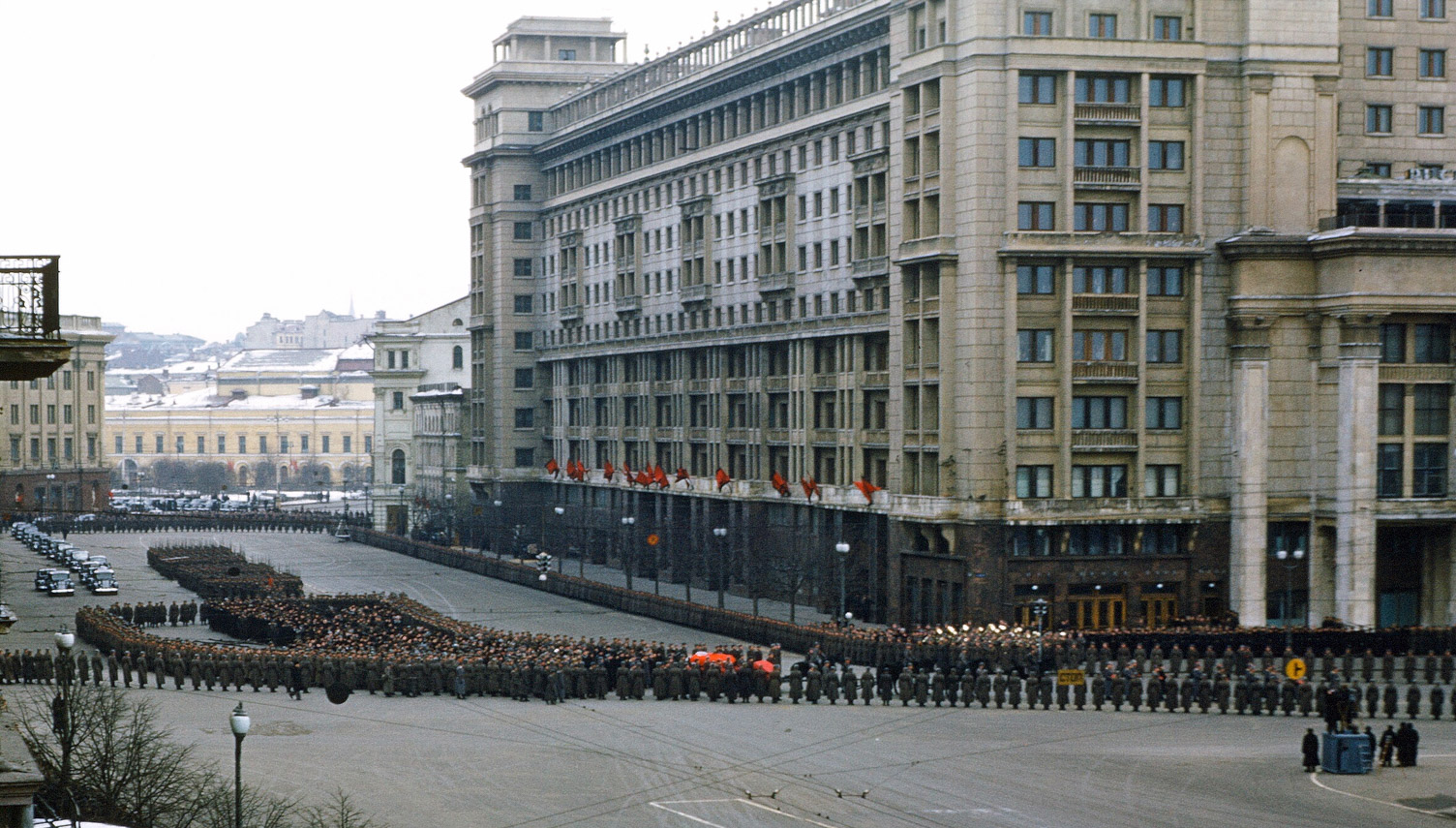
- Stalin's funeral procession on Okhotny Ryad
- Date: 5–9 March 1953
- Location: Red Square, Moscow, Russian SFSR, Soviet Union
- Organized by: Soviet Union
- Participants: Nikita Khrushchev, Georgy Malenkov, Vyacheslav Molotov, Lavrentiy Beria, Patriarch Alexy I, Nicholas (Yarushevich) and other Soviet, Church and foreign dignitaries
- Deaths: 109–1000+

Joseph Stalin, second leader of the Soviet Union, died on 5 March 1953 at his Kuntsevo Dacha after suffering a stroke, at age 74. He was given a state funeral in Moscow on 9 March, with four days of national mourning declared. On the day of the funeral, of the hundreds of thousands of Soviet citizens visiting the capital to pay their respects, at least 109 were later acknowledged to have died in a crowd crush.

Stalin's body was embalmed and interred in Lenin's Mausoleum until 1961, when it was moved to the Kremlin Wall Necropolis. The members of Stalin's inner circle in charge of organizing his funeral were Nikita Khrushchev, then-head of the Moscow branch of the Communist Party; Lavrentiy Beria, head of the NKVD; Georgy Malenkov, the chairman of the Presidium; and Vyacheslav Molotov, previously the Soviet Union's Minister of Foreign Affairs.

== Illness and death ==
Joseph Stalin's health had begun to deteriorate towards the end of the Second World War. He had atherosclerosis as a result of heavy smoking, a mild stroke around the time of the Victory Parade in May 1945, and a severe heart attack in October 1945.

The last three days of Stalin's life have been described in detail, first in the official Soviet announcements in Pravda, and then in a complete English translation which followed shortly thereafter in The Current Digest of the Soviet Press. Decades later, former senior officer and historian Dmitry Volkogonov described how, on 28 February 1953, Stalin and a small number of his inner circle, consisting of Lavrentiy Beria, Nikita Khrushchev, Georgy Malenkov, Vyacheslav Molotov and a few others, gathered for an evening of entertainment and drinking. After the guests dispersed at approximately 5:00 a.m. on 1 March, Khrushchev noted that Stalin had a lot to drink and was in a good mood. Stalin later retired to his private quarters. Time passed and no sounds were heard throughout the next day, Sunday, 1 March. Stalin's room was said to have been equipped with sensors to alert the staff and guards if there was any movement. At approximately 11:00 p.m. on 1 March, Stalin's housekeeper cautiously entered his room and found him lying on the floor, wearing his pajama trousers and a shirt. He was unconscious, breathing heavily, incontinent and unresponsive to attempts to rouse him.

At 7:00 a.m. on 2 March, Beria and a group of medical experts were summoned to examine Stalin. Based on their examination, which revealed blood pressure of 190/110 and right-sided hemiplegia, they concluded that Stalin, who had a known history of uncontrolled hypertension, had sustained a hemorrhagic stroke involving the left middle cerebral artery. Over the next two days he received a variety of treatments. In an attempt to decrease his blood pressure, which had risen to 210/120, two separate applications of eight leeches each were applied to his neck and face over the next two days. However, Stalin's condition continued to deteriorate and he died at 9:50 p.m. on 5 March 1953. His death was announced the next day on Radio Moscow by Yuri Levitan.

Stalin's body was then taken to an unspecified location and an autopsy performed, after which it was embalmed for public viewing. Attempts to locate and access the original autopsy report were unsuccessful until the 2010s, but the most important findings were reported in a special bulletin in Pravda on 7 March 1953, as follows:

"Pathological-Anatomical Examination of the Body of J. V. Stalin"

Pathologic examination revealed a large hemorrhage, localized to the area of subcortical centers of the left cerebral hemisphere. This hemorrhage destroyed important areas of the brain and resulted in irreversible changes in the respiration and circulation. In addition to the brain hemorrhage, there were found significant hypertrophy of the left ventricle (of the heart), numerous hemorrhages in the myocardium, in the stomach and intestinal mucosa; atherosclerotic changes in the vessels, more prominent in the cerebral arteries. These are the result of hypertension. The results of the pathologic examination revealed the irreversible character of J.V. Stalin's disease from the moment of brain hemorrhage. Therefore, all treatment attempts could not have led to a favorable outcome and prevent a fatal end."

As summarized above, rather than suggesting a plot by Beria, on whom suspicion fell for his purportedly telling Molotov that he "took him out" at one point, and his seemingly willful delay in obtaining medical treatment for Stalin, the physical changes seen during autopsy were consistent with extracranial changes that often occur in stroke victims.

Beria's son, Sergo Beria, later recounted that after Stalin's death, his mother Nina told her husband that, "Your position now is even more precarious than when Stalin was alive." This turned out to be correct; several months later, in June 1953, Beria was arrested and charged with a variety of crimes but, significantly, none relating to Stalin's death. He was subsequently found guilty of treason, terrorism and counter-revolutionary activity by the Supreme Court of the Soviet Union on 23 December 1953, and executed the same day, shot by General Pavel Batitsky.

Some historians have conjectured that Stalin was murdered; Beria has been accused of poisoning him, but no firm evidence has appeared. According to a theory developed by historians Vladimir Naumov and Jonathan Brent, based on mentions of stomach hemorrhaging excised from his autopsy, Stalin was poisoned with warfarin, most likely by Beria.

== Funeral service ==
External videos
- Official Soviet documentary on Stalin's funeral
- Part of Soviet footage of Stalin's funeral

On 6 March, the coffin containing Stalin's body was put on display at the Hall of Columns in the House of the Unions, remaining there for three days. On 9 March, the body was delivered to Red Square prior to interment in Lenin's Mausoleum. Speeches were delivered by Khrushchev, Malenkov, Molotov and Beria, after which pallbearers carried the coffin to the mausoleum. As Stalin's body was being interred, a moment of silence was observed nationwide at noon Moscow time. As the bells of the Kremlin Clock chimed the hour, sirens and horns wailed nationwide, along with a 21-gun salute fired from within the precincts of the Kremlin. Similar observances were also held in other Eastern Bloc countries, including Mongolia, China and North Korea. Immediately after the silence ended, a military band played the Soviet State Anthem, and then a military parade of the Moscow Garrison was held in Stalin's honor.

In their efforts to pay their respects to Stalin, a number of Soviet citizens, many of whom had travelled from across the country to attend the funeral, were crushed and trampled to death in a crowd crush. They were crushed against building walls and Soviet Army trucks, which had been deployed to block off side streets. Mourners, along with mounted police and their horses, were trampled to death in Trubnaya Square. The Soviet government did not initially report the event, and the exact number of casualties is unknown. Khrushchev later estimated that 109 people died in the crowd.

== Foreign dignitaries in attendance ==
According to Ogoniok, the mourners included the following foreign dignitaries (listed alphabetically by last name):

- (Polish People's Republic) Bolesław Bierut – Prime Minister of Poland, Secretary General of the Polish United Workers' Party
- (People's Republic of Bulgaria) Valko Chervenkov – Prime Minister of Bulgaria, General Secretary of the Bulgarian Communist Party
- (French Fourth Republic) Jacques Duclos – Interim General Secretary of the French Communist Party
- (Socialist Republic of Romania) Gheorghe Gheorghiu-Dej – President of the State Council and Prime Minister of Romania, First Secretary of the Romanian Workers' Party
- (Czechoslovak Socialist Republic) Klement Gottwald – President of Czechoslovakia, Chairman of the Communist Party of Czechoslovakia
- (East Germany) Otto Grotewohl – Chairman of the Council of Ministers of the German Democratic Republic
- Dolores Ibárruri – General Secretary of the Communist Party of Spain
- Urho Kekkonen – Prime Minister of Finland
- (People's Socialist Republic of Albania) Spiro Koleka – Vice-Premier of the People's Republic of Albania
- Johann Koplenig – Chairman of the Communist Party of Austria
- (Italy) Pietro Nenni – Secretary of the Italian Socialist Party
- (United Kingdom) Harry Pollitt – General Secretary of the Communist Party of Great Britain
- (Hungarian People's Republic) Mátyás Rákosi – Chairman of the Council of Ministers of Hungary
- (West Germany) Max Reimann – Chairman of the West German Communist Party
- (Polish People's Republic) Konstantin Rokossovsky – Defence Minister of Poland
- (Italy) Palmiro Togliatti – General Secretary of the Italian Communist Party
- (Mongolian People's Republic) Yumjaagiin Tsedenbal – Prime Minister of Mongolia
- (East Germany) Walter Ulbricht – First Secretary of the Socialist Unity Party of Germany, Deputy Chairman of the Council of Ministers of the German Democratic Republic
- Zhou Enlai – Premier of the People's Republic of China

Czechoslovak leader Gottwald died shortly after attending Stalin's funeral, on 14 March 1953, after one of his arteries burst.

== Other tributes ==
Fearing their departure might encourage rivals within the ranks of the Party of Labour of Albania, neither Prime Minister Enver Hoxha nor Deputy Prime Minister Mehmet Shehu risked traveling to Moscow to attend the funeral, with Hoxha instead pledging eternal allegiance to the late Soviet leader.

Guatemalan officials in the government of Jacobo Árbenz eulogized Stalin as a "great statesman and leader ... whose passing is mourned by all progressive men". The Guatemalan Congress paid tribute to Stalin with a "minute of silence". At the request of President Eisenhower, Secretary of State John Foster Dulles transmitted a message of condolence through the American Embassy to the Soviet Foreign Ministry.

== Church tributes ==
After Stalin's death, Patriarch Alexy I composed a personal statement of condolence to the Soviet Council of Ministers:

"His death is a heavy grief for our Fatherland and for all the people who inhabit it. The whole Russian Orthodox Church, which will never forget his benevolent attitude to Church needs, feels great sorrow at his death. The bright memory of him will live ineradicably in our hearts. Our Church proclaims eternal memory to him with a special feeling of abiding love."

Alexy I also gave a eulogy on the day of Stalin's funeral. Other Orthodox officials, including Nicholas (Yarushevich), attended the funeral and mourned for Stalin.

== Aftermath ==
Stalin left neither a designated successor nor a framework within which a peaceful transfer of power could take place. The Central Committee met on the day of his death, after which Malenkov, Beria, and Khrushchev emerged as the party's dominant figures. The system of collective leadership was restored, and measures introduced to prevent any one member from attaining autocratic domination. The collective leadership included eight senior members of the Presidium of the Central Committee of the Communist Party of the Soviet Union, namely Malenkov, Beria, Molotov, Kliment Voroshilov, Khrushchev, Nikolai Bulganin, Lazar Kaganovich and Anastas Mikoyan. Reforms to the Soviet system were immediately implemented. Economic reform scaled back the mass construction projects, placed a new emphasis on house building, and eased the levels of taxation on the peasantry to stimulate production. The new leaders sought rapprochement with Yugoslavia and a less hostile relationship with the U.S., and they pursued a negotiated end to the Korean War in July 1953. The doctors who had been imprisoned were released and the anti-Semitic purges ceased. A mass amnesty for certain categories of convicts was issued, halving the country's inmate population, while the state security and Gulag systems were reformed, with torture being banned in April 1953.

== Gallery ==
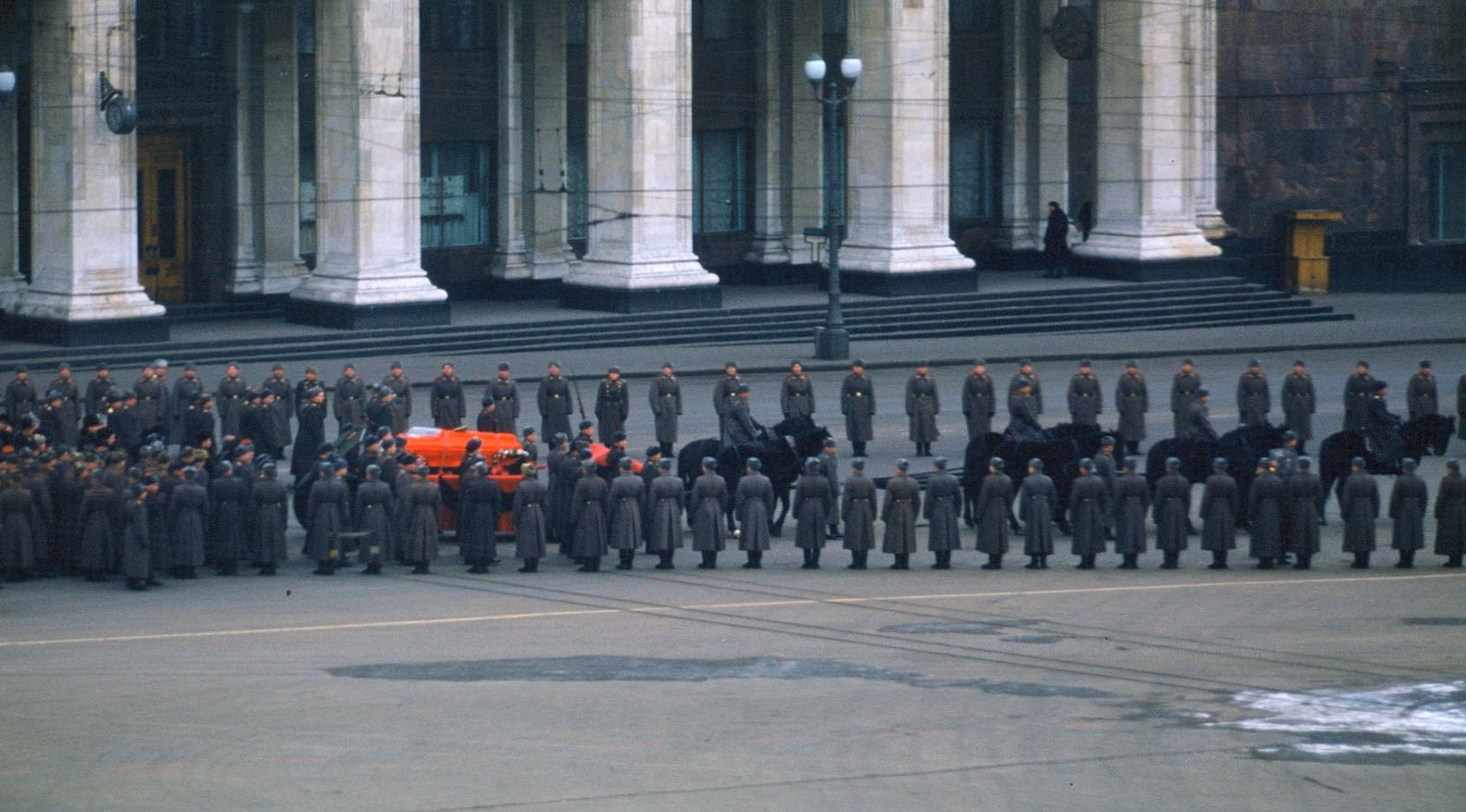
Stalin's funeral procession

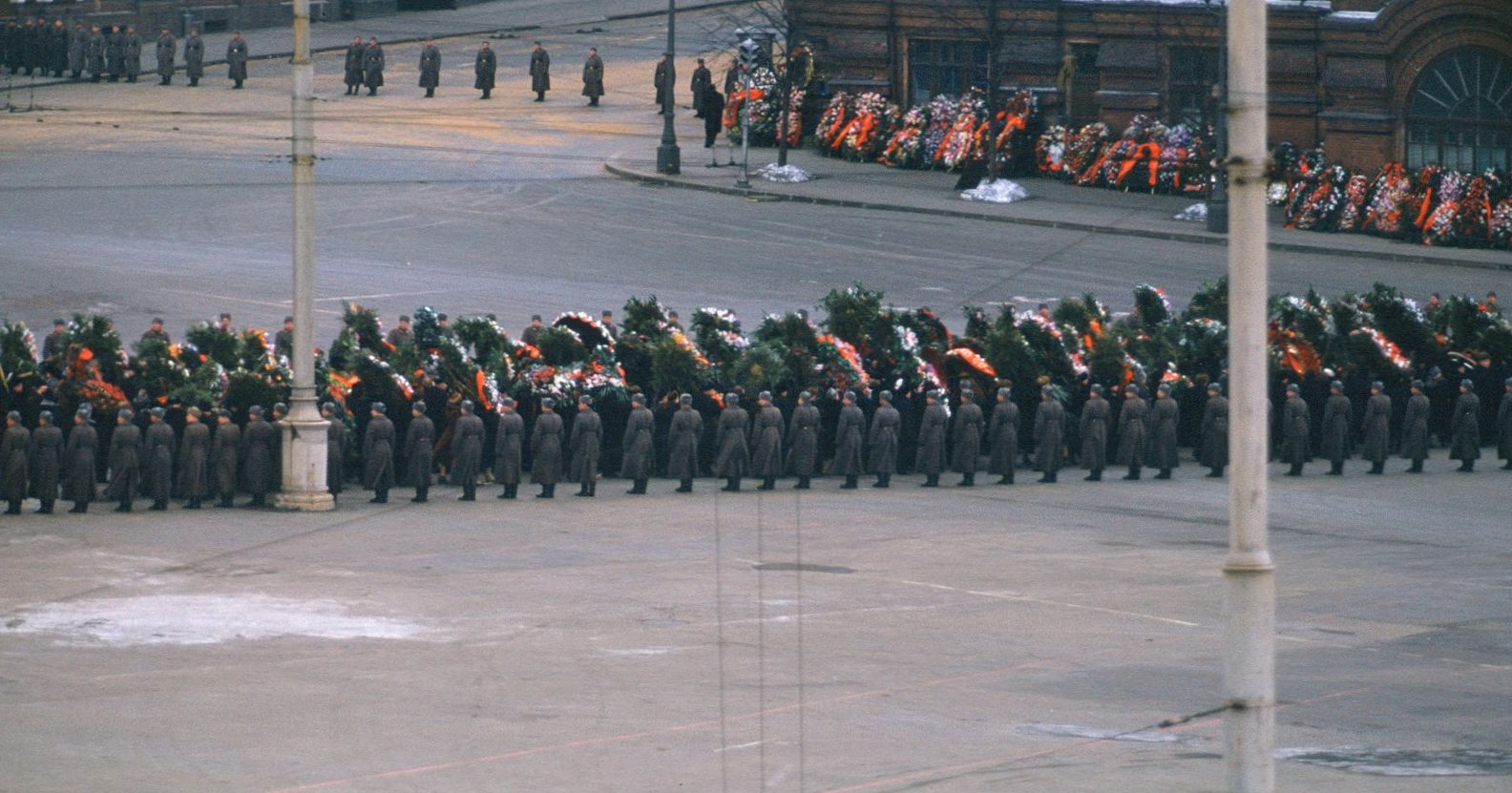
Floristry at the funeral procession

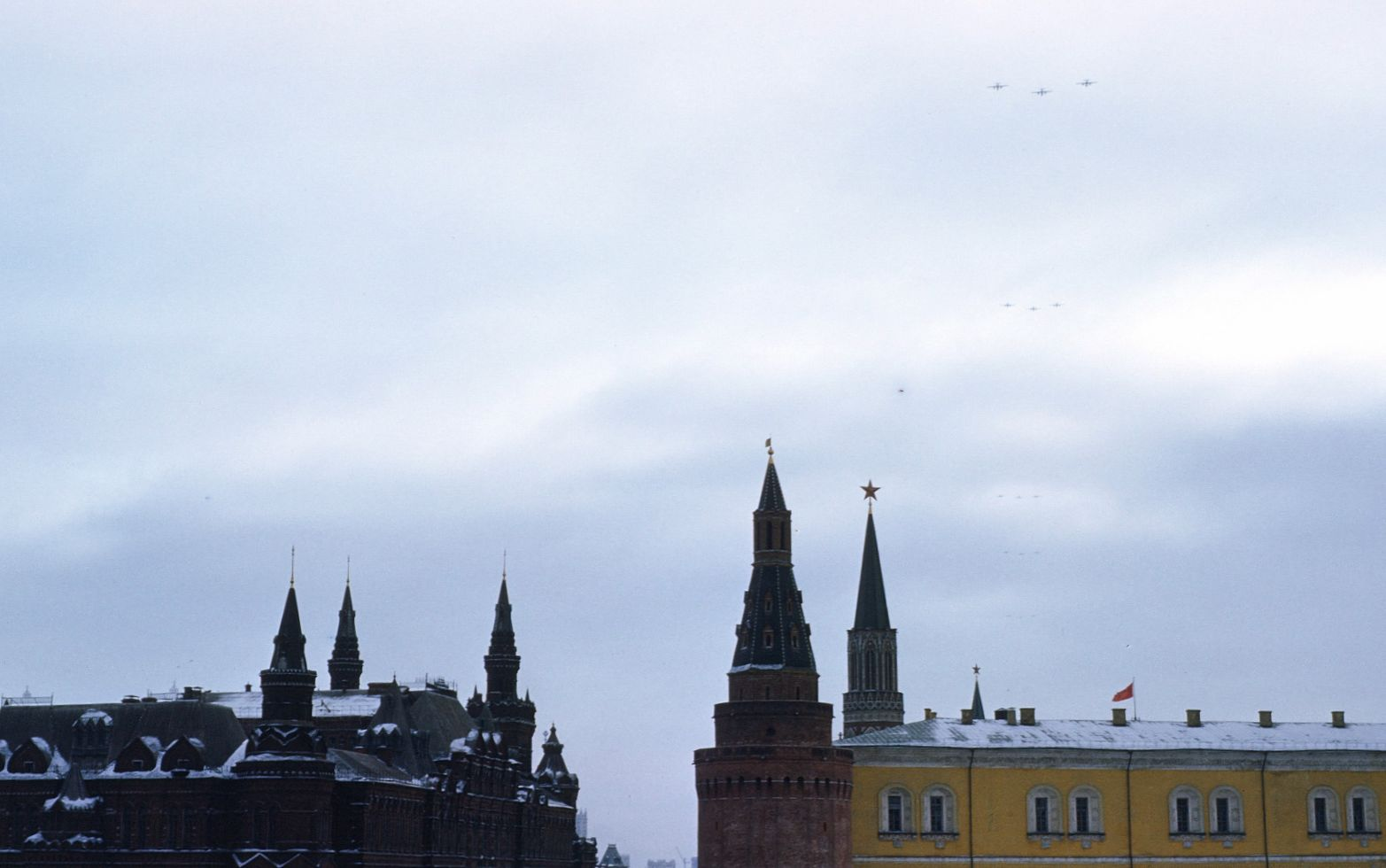
Aircraft (Ilyushin Il-28) of the Soviet Air Force during the military parade

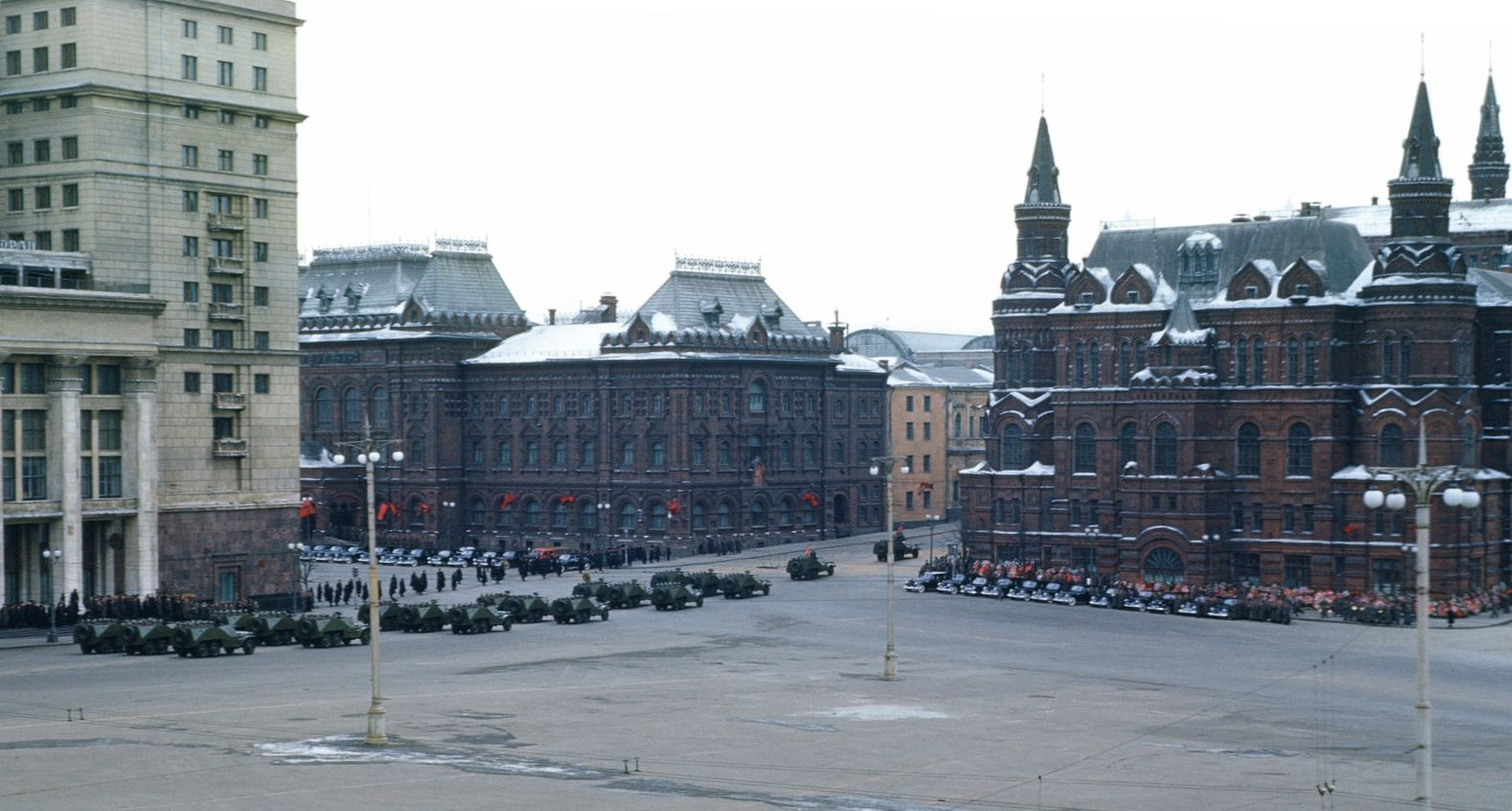
BTR-152 APCs en route to Red Square

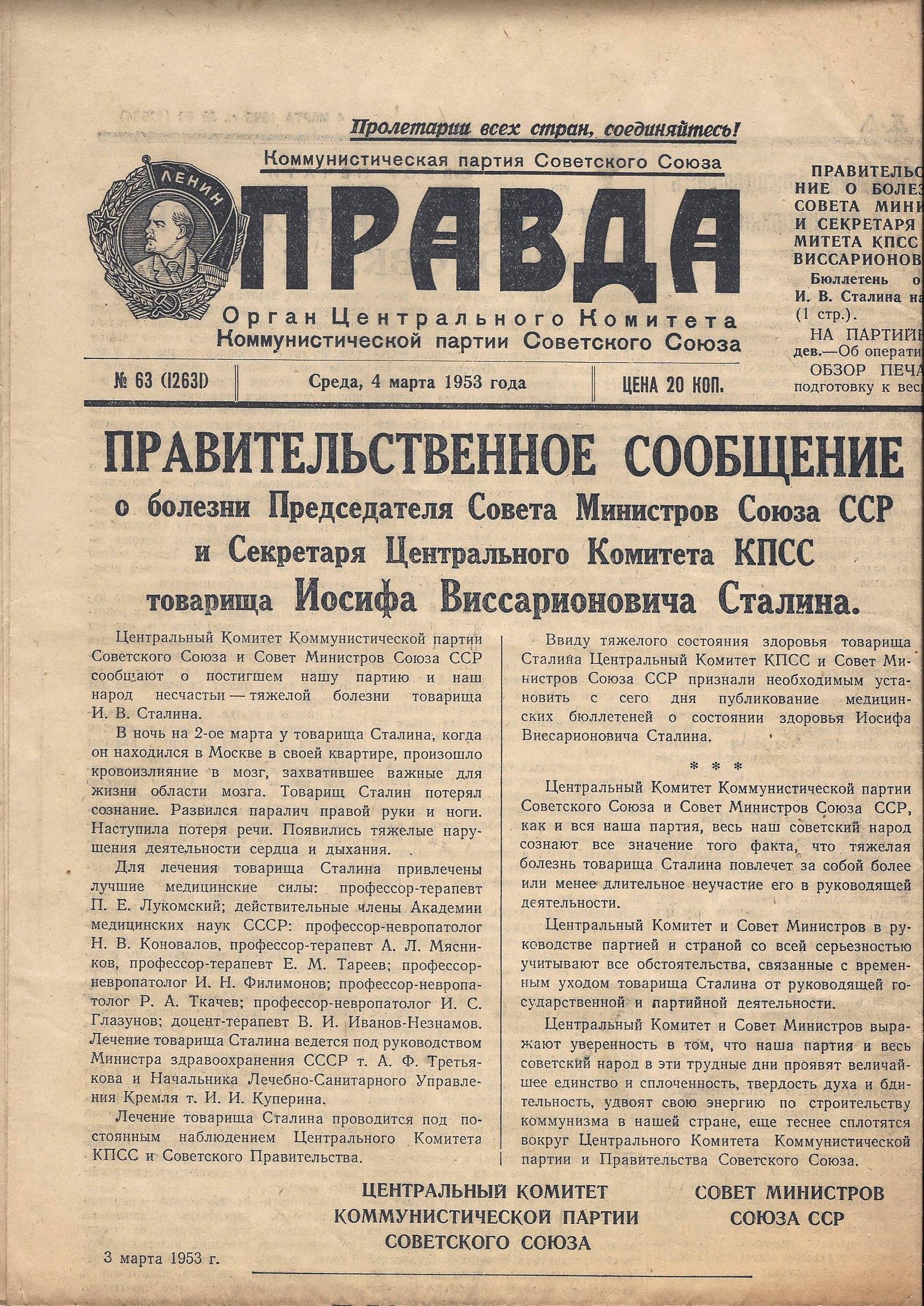
The first report about Stalin's illness appeared in Pravda three days after the stroke (1 March) and one day before he died. Pravda issue 63 (12631), dated 4 March 1953.

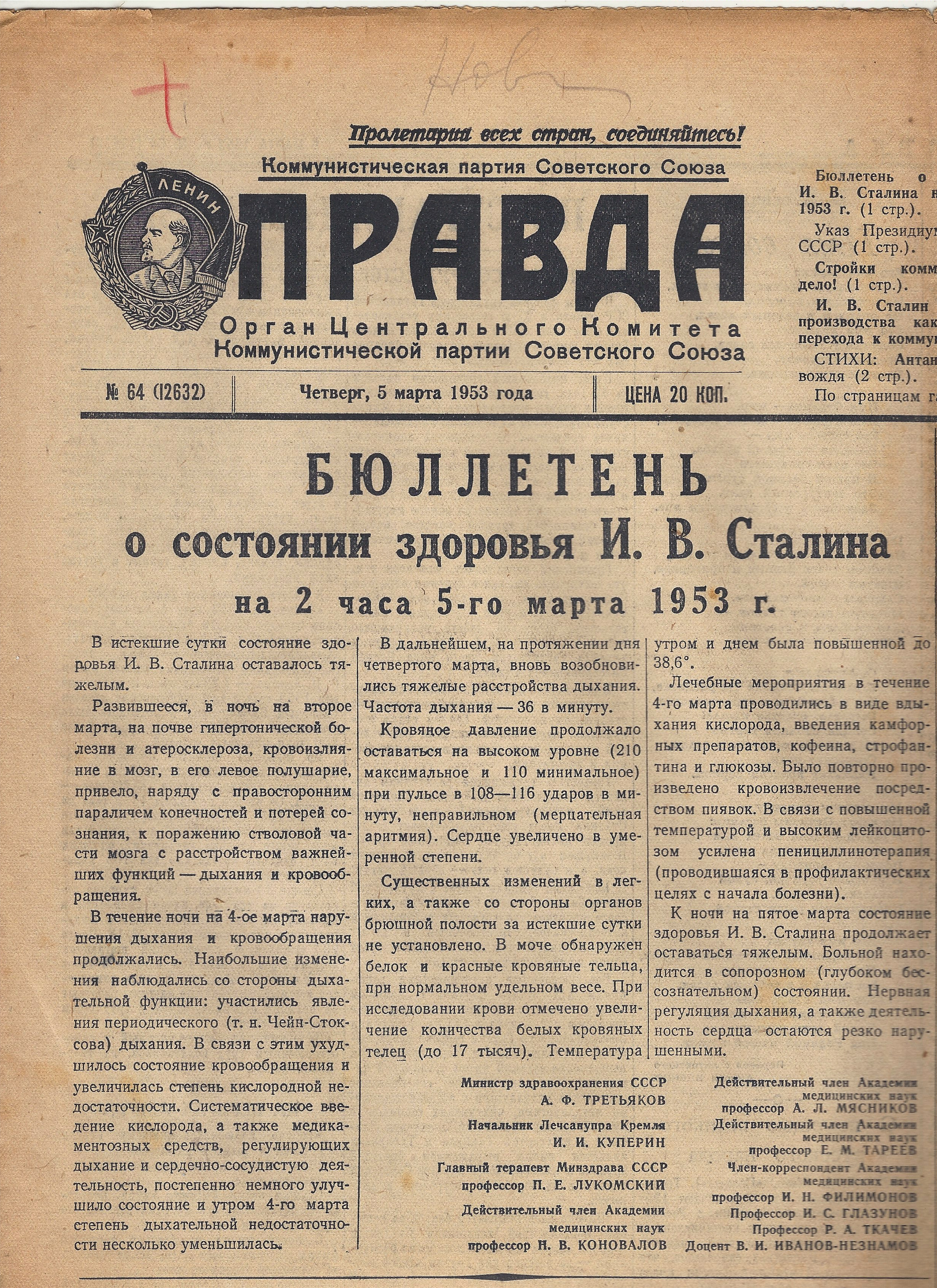
Another report on Stalin's medical condition was published four days after the stroke (1 March) and 7 hours before he died. Pravda issue 64 (12632), dated 5 March 1953.

== See also ==
- Death and state funeral of Vladimir Lenin
- Death and state funeral of Leonid Brezhnev
- The Death of Stalin, a 2017 film directed by Armando Iannucci
- State Funeral (2019 film)
