= Almas Ildyrym =

Almas Ildyrym

Almas Ildyrym (Azerbaijani: Almas İldırım), born Ildyrym Almaszade (25 March 1907, Baku – 14 January 1952, Elazığ, Turkey), was an Azerbaijani poet. After the Bolsheviks established their power in Azerbaijan in 1920, the fact that Ildyrym had been born into a wealthy merchant family plagued him for the rest of his life. Though he was accepted to the faculty of Oriental Literature at Azerbaijan State University, it was not long before they dismissed him because of his family origins.

In 1926, Almas co-authored a book of poems, Dün bugün ("Yesterday is Today") with Suleyman Rustam. Soon he was exiled to Dagestan for the nationalist ideas in his poems. While in exile, he wrote Dağlardan xatirələr ("Memories from the Mountains"), Ləzgi elləri ("Lezgi Lands"), Krımda axşamlar ("Evenings in Crimea"), Səlimxan, and Günah kimdədir? ("Whose Fault is It?"). Two years later, he returned to Baku and published a collection of poems entitled Dağlar Səslənərkən ("When Mountains Make a Sound," 1930). However, the distribution of this book was prohibited, and the author was banned from the Writers' Union of Azerbaijan.

Again, he was exiled, this time to Turkmenistan where he worked as a school director. But because he was constantly repressed, he decided to escape to Iran with his family. However, while crossing the border into Iran, he was caught and made to stay in water up to his chest for hours. Upon being released, he decided to leave for Eastern Anatolia in Turkey.

Many of his works describe the longing he had for his native land. He published his poems about his love and longing for his country in the magazines Qurtuluş ("Salvation") in Germany, Çinar altı in Kars, as well as Kok Boru, Organ, Ozlayish and in the Van newspaper in Turkey. He published the poems that he had written until 1936 in the book Undying Poem. Other books are Azerbaijani songs and Azerbaijani bayatis.
