= Irada Alili =

Azerbaijani journalist

Irada Alili İradə Əlili
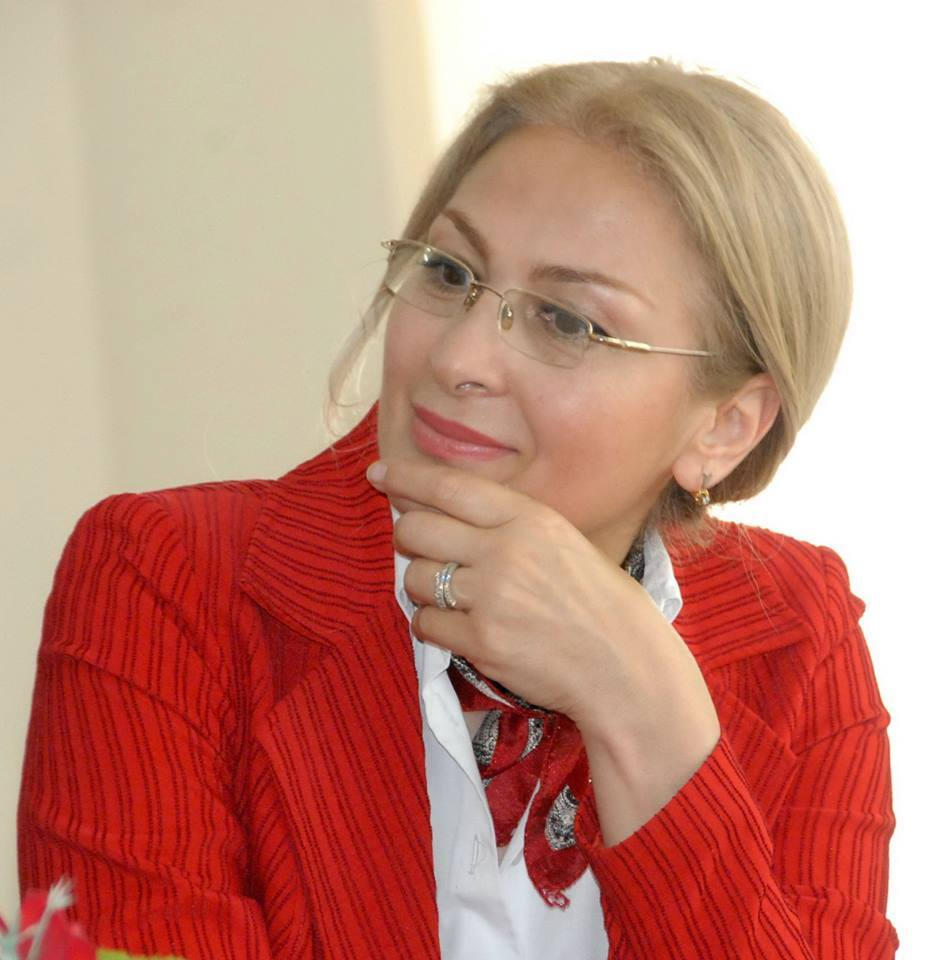
- Born: 20 April 1964 (age 61); Sabirabad, Azerbaijan SSR, USSR
- Citizenship: USSR; Azerbaijan
- Education: Baku State University
- Occupation: journalist
- Awards: "Khangizi Natavan" Award

Irada Alili (Azerbaijani: İradə Əlili; born 20 April 1964) is an Azerbaijani journalist, cultural worker, Chairman of the Public Union for the Development of Vocational Education, member of the Union of Azerbaijani Writers.

== Biography ==
Irada Alili was born on 20 April 1964 in Sabirabad. In 1984 she entered the faculty of librarian of Baku Cultural and Educational College and graduated in 1986 with honors. Then in 1988–1994 she studied at the faculty of librarian and information of Baku State University. She worked as a teacher at the library and information faculty of Baku State University, as a teacher in the professional development course of cultural workers of the Ministry of Culture, and participated in conferences in Russia, Turkey and other countries.

Irada Alili is currently the head of the bookkeeping department and chairperson of the trade union committee at the Republican Scientific Medical Library. She is a member of the Union of Azerbaijani Journalists and the Union of Azerbaijani Writers, chairperson of the Public Union for the Development of Vocational Education (PUDVE).

In 2020, she was the head of the project "Organization of online educational events to prepare future teachers for the organization of career guidance in school" developed by PUDVE. She was the head of the project "From education to profession" covering 2020–2021, developed by PUDVE with the support of the Council on State Support to NGOs under the Auspices of the President of the Republic of Azerbaijan.

== Awards ==
- "Khangizi Natavan" Award
