= Irada Rovshan =

Azerbaijani architect

- Irada Abdullayeva
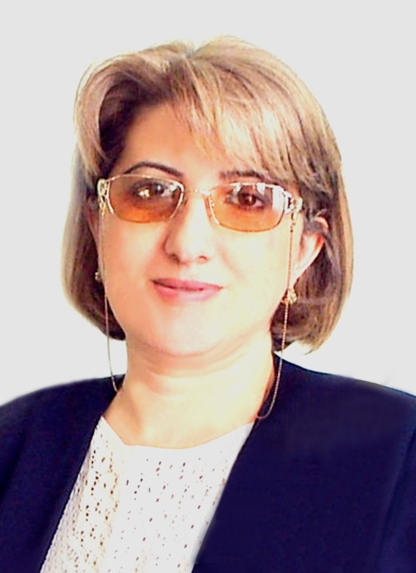
- Born: May 15, 1968; Zagatala
- Died: September 30, 2014 (aged 46); Sheki
- Resting place: Sheki
- Citizenship: Soviet Union→Azerbaijan
- Education: Azerbaijan Architecture and Construction University

Irada Rovshan (Azerbaijani: İradə Rövşən; (May 15, 1968 – September 30, 2014)) was an Azerbaijan architect and scientist. She was head of the “Folklore and Ethnography” laboratory of Sheki Regional Scientific Center, and a member of the Union of Architects of Azerbaijan .

== Life ==
Irada Rovshan Abdullayeva (Mamedova) was born on May 15, 1968, in Zagatala. She graduated from Azerbaijan Architecture and Construction University (1990), and was a member of the Union of Architects of Azerbaijan (2013). Rovshan completed secondary school No. 2 in Zagatala (Russian language sector) in 1975-1985. Studying in X grade, she was busy with training for the correspondence preparation course of Leningrad (now St. Petersburg), the Institute of Engineering and Construction. She entered the University of Architecture and Construction and graduated there with honors in 1990 and received higher education after leaving secondary school. Rovshan began her professional career in 1991 in the Sheki Regional Scientific Center of ANAS. Until 1998, she worked as the laboratory assistant then as a junior researcher. She moved to St. Petersburg in 1998 and lived there until 2004. In 2004, she returned again to Sheki and continued working in the Sheki Regional Scientific Center of the previous place.

== Labour activity ==
Rovshan earned recognition from colleagues at the Sheki Regional Research Center for her knowledge, abilities, and work. Based on their recommendation, she continued her research activities. The Scientific Council of the ANAS Institute of Architecture and Art later approved the dissertation topic “The Interior of the Sheki Houses,” taking her research work into consideration. Irada Rovshan has begun to investigate this theme deeply, successfully completing this field of research. The members of the council commission appreciated her scientific innovation and the relevance of the research. Rovshan has defended the theme "The interior of the Sheki houses" and was awarded the title of Candidate of Architecture (architecture, Ph.D.) on 25 December 2007 by the Scientific Council of the University of Architecture and Construction. After receiving a degree, she began her leadership position; she was appointed scientific secretary in the SHRSC. From 2013 until the last days of her life she was the head of the “Folklore and Ethnography” laboratory. Roshan has published a book named "The interior of the Sheki houses (from eighteenth to early-twentieth century)" in 2008. At the same time, she published numerous scientific articles in the country as well as while working abroad.

Rovshan was not only interested in architecture; she also was interested in folk art and oral literature of Azerbaijan. Her ideas about national folklore attracted folklore experts.

All her published articles outside the borders of the country, and inside the country would be of interest to experts from time to time. Rovshan has also worked in the local Sheki municipality press (newspapers) for a long time, published the scientific- publicistic articles, and gained a lot of readers.

== Basic scientific achievements ==
- 1. "Residential interiors of Sheki (at the end of the eighteenth and early nineteenth century)," Baku: "Science", 2008.- 152 pp. (Book - Azerbaijani and Russian language)
- 2. “Collection and analysis of samples of Balakan-Sheki region's folklore and folk arts."

== Awards ==
- 1. 2008- Irada Rovshan was awarded the “Year winner" for the contribution to the development of science by Sheki Executive power
- 2. 2012- was awarded the "Honor diploma" by the Azerbaijan National Academy of Sciences for 40-year anniversary of Sheki Regional Scientific

== Scientific works ==
- 1. National housing interior of Sheki, the value of its traditions in the formation of human personality. Baku, Urbanism. No.8, 2005, p. 127-133.
- 2. Adorable folk style. News of Pedagogical University No.2; Baku, ASPU, 2005, p. 440-446.
- 3. The house-museum of M.F. Akhundov. Architecture, urban planning history and restoration. SBMA. Baku, No. 5, p. 105-109.
- 4. From the past to the present. Researching: No. 1, Baku, 2005, p. 329-336.
- 5. About Bukhara, bears and trays. Researching: No.3, Baku, 2004, p. 285-290.
- 6. Look at the mirror once again,. Folklore and Ethnography. 2004, number 03, pp. 28–31.
- 7. Jejim. Science and Life: No. 6, Baku, 2004, p. 33-34.
- 8. Two century. Science and Life. No. 1-1, Baku, 2002, p. 20-21.
- 9. About the interior of the Sheki city dwelling houses. Folklore and Ethnography: Baku, 2004, number 04, pp. 67–71.
- 10. Embroidery "tekalduz" in the interior of the housing Sheki. Folklore and Ethnography: Baku, 2005, number 02, pp. 64–69.
- 11. Let's look at one of the mirrors. Gobustan.: Baku, No. 2, 2005, с. 38-40.
- 12. House of master Latif Haji Yusif oglu. Urbanism. Baku.
- 13. Sheki ancient and modern yard fences, gates. Folklore and Ethnography: 2008, No. 3-4, p. 82-88.
- 14. Sheki. Gelersen gorersen (Will come and see): 2008,
- 15. The stones of creates and preserves the history. Folklore and Ethnography 2009, No. 2, p. 53-58.
- 16. The great way of life (essays, memoirs). Compilers: Zechariah Alizadeh, Irade Rovshan. Baku: "Science and Education", 2010, 416 p.
- 17. Live museums. Folklore and Ethnography 2011, No. 02, p. 22-26
- 18. Sheki city is an architectural monument. Folklore and Ethnography 2012, No. 01, p. 61-66
- 19. Sheki. Gobustan .: Baku, No. 1, 2012
- 20. Urban planning and architecture of Sheki during the development of sericulture (XVIII-XX centuries). Fundamental and applied science problems. M .: Academy of Sciences, 2012
