= Institute of Folklore (Azerbaijan) =

The Institute of Folklore in Azerbaijan is an independent institute, which started its activity in 1994 on the base of the Azerbaijan National Academy of Sciences (ANAS). The institute collects and investigated Azerbaijani folklore samples as its activities.

== History ==
In the 1920s, the scientific organization of folklore in Azerbaijan acted within the Organization of Investigation and Studying of Azerbaijan (OISA). Folklorist Hanafi Zeynalli was the head of Folklore Commission from 1923–1929. He was also the head of the Oral Literature section created within the Transcaucasian Branch of Scientific Academy of USSR. In 1935, Azerbaijan Branch of Scientific Academy of USSR was launched on the base of the same branch the Folklore section created. In 1920–1930, investigations and publications of Azerbaijani folklore were carried out. Azerbaijan State Scientific Investigation Institute was established in 1929. Within the institute, the Department of Folklore of Language, Literature, and Art that was headed by Veli Khuluflu was created. Baba Asgerov was head of the Folklore section in that period.

The institute was the victim of the repression.

The Scientific-Cultural Center "Palace of Folklore" was created within the Institute of Literature in 1994 and the individual building of the center is situated in Icharishahar (Old City), Baku. Huseyn Ismayilov was appointed as an executor director of the Scientific-Cultural Center "Palace of Folklore" in the ANAS Institute of Literature named after Nizami in 1995.

=== 2000s ===
The Scientific-Cultural Center continued its activity as an independent structural unit of Azerbaijan National Scientific Academy in 2003. In 2005–2007, the institute established Ashik music department and Qazakh-Borchali and Foreign Relations sections were created. The department of Ashik music became a scientific investigation department in 2007. In 2012, the ANAS Institute of Folklore became a member of Caucasian universities.

== Structures ==
=== Scientific Council of Institute ===
The Scientific Council of Institute is the main decision-making structure of the institute. The main issues discussed in council are an affirmation of the scientific investigation plans and accounts, publication of scientific researches and folklore collections, an organization of scientific conferences and meetings.

=== Department of Classic folklore ===
In 2003–2013, the department was called Azerbaijan folklore, headed by Israfil Abbasli.

=== Department of the folklore of Turkic nations ===
This department started its activity in 2003. It carries out investigations of folklore samples of Turkic nations, analyses folklore monuments, common Turkic folklore texts, translations and publication of folklore examples. Afzaladdin Asgerov is the head of the department.

=== Department of Dede Korkut ===
In the early years, the department called "Korkut study" was established in 2000 to commemorate the 1300th anniversary of the Book of Dede Korkut. From 2011, the department started to act as "Dede Korkut". This department carries out analysis of the Book of Dede Korkut.

=== Department of Ashik activity ===
The department was established in 2001; it acts as a department on the basis of the Institute of folklore in 2003.

=== Department of Mythology ===
In 2003, this department was established as an independent unit on the basis of the Institute of Folklore. It worked on collecting mythological texts, defining historical roots and carrying out diachronic structure studies of the myth. The department has investigated mythological samples in Turkic texts. The head of the department is assistant professor Seyfeddin Rzayev.

=== Department of Southern Azerbaijan ===
The department started its activity in 2013 in order to collect and investigate the Southern Azerbaijan folklore.

=== Department of Modern folklore ===
The department of Modern folklore was created in order to investigate Azerbaijani in a modern context.

=== Department of Ceremony folklore ===
The department acts from 2011 and carries out researching and collecting of folk ceremonies, performances, plays, and rituals.

=== Department of Folklore and written literature ===
The department started its activity in 2011. The department publishes scientific articles about the classic literature of Azerbaijan.

=== Department of Collecting and systematizing of folklore ===
The department acts from 2011. The department systematizes folklore samples according to the genres.

=== Department of Music folklore ===
The Department of Music folklore was created in 2011 and joined to Ashik art and saz mastery. The department assembles ancient folk music and Ashik music and restores them. At the same time, the department analyses mugham art.

=== Folklore fund ===
The fund is also known as a scientific archive and deals with the collection and preservation of all folklore materials, which are assembled by the departments.
