= Gromyko (surname) =

Gromyko or Gramyka is a Slavic surname that may refer to:

- Andrei Gromyko (1909–1989), Soviet statesman
- Lydia Gromyko (1911–2004), wife of Andrei Gromyko
- Anatoly Gromyko (1932–2017), Soviet academician and diplomat, son of Andrei Gromyko
- Julia Gromyko (born 1971), Belarusian-German waterskier

== See also ==
- Gromeko
