= Berlin Crisis =

Berlin Crisis may refer to:

- Berlin Crisis of 1958–1959, involving Eisenhower and Khrushchev
- Berlin Crisis of 1961, involving Kennedy and Khrushchev

== See also ==
- Berlin Blockade of 1948–1949, also referred to as the Berlin Airlift or Operation Vittles
