= Rapacki Plan =

1957 plan for nuclear disarmament in Central Europe

- Type: Nuclear Disarmament Proposal
- Drafted: 1957-1958
- Condition: Rejected
- Negotiators: Poland
- Parties: Poland; Federal Republic of Germany; German Democratic Republic; Czechoslovakia

The Rapacki Plan (pronounced Rapatz-ki) was a proposal presented in a speech by Polish Foreign Minister Adam Rapacki to the United Nations General Assembly on 2 October 1957 as a limited plan for nuclear disarmament and demilitarization in Central Europe by establishing a nuclear-free zone. The plan declared that the People's Republic of Poland would not station or produce any nuclear armaments within their territory, if the Federal Republic of Germany and the German Democratic Republic agreed to do the same. Czechoslovakia would later include itself in support of the nuclear-free zone. The plan followed attempts by both Western Powers and the Soviet Union to de-escalate Cold War tensions and push for greater disarmament during the mid-1950s.

== Overview ==
The plan was supported by all of the Soviet-dominated states of the Warsaw Pact. However, during a NATO Council meeting in Paris in December 1957, it was rejected on the basis that it would leave Western Europe vulnerable to communist conventional armies that were perceived to be a relatively greater military threat. The United States believed that supporting the plan would mean a loss of the balance of power in Europe – evidenced by the Eisenhower administration's response. The United Kingdom also saw the plan as a threat to the security of NATO countries because of how it would enable the dominance of Soviet forces in Eastern Europe. West Germany was strongly opposed to the idea of a denuclearized zone as it was feared that the plan would diminish the state's power and influence as a part of NATO, and further, would violate the Hallstein Doctrine through the signing of a treaty with East Germany. Not all NATO members were opposed to the plan however, with the governments of Norway, Denmark and Canada publicly expressing their support for it. Rapacki in 1958 presented several modified versions of his original plan to cater to Western concerns, but won little support from them. One iteration included a two-stage plan; the first stage would ensure that no new nuclear weapons would be brought into the Central European zone, while the second stage would see NATO and the Warsaw Pact work together to eliminate all remaining nuclear armaments in the area. Support for the plan effectively lost its traction when Soviet Premier, Nikita Khrushchev, tried to force West Germany to accept it during the Berlin Crisis of 1958–1959.

== Historical Context ==
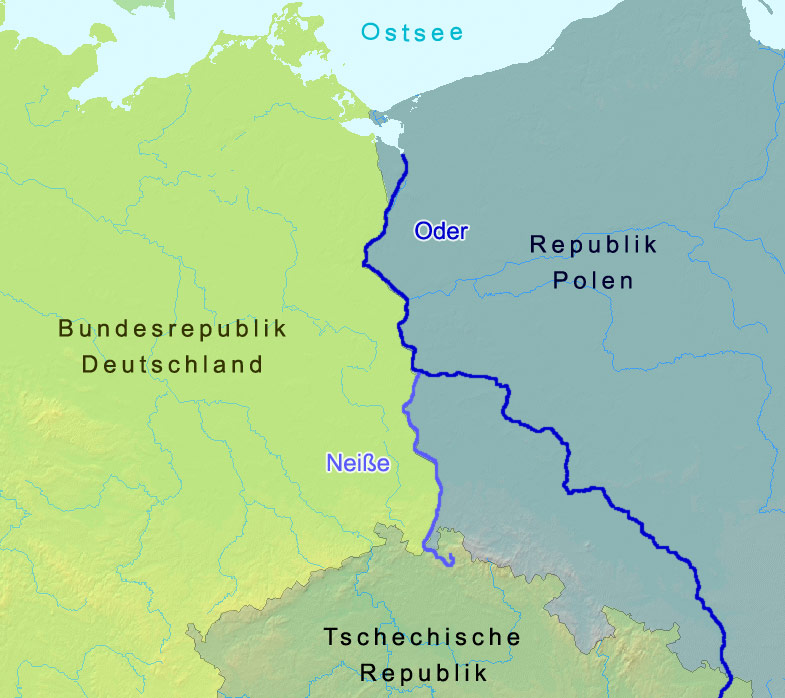
The Oder-Neisse line delineating the German and Polish border.

=== Geneva Summit 1955 ===
Held on July 18, 1955, the summit sought to effectively end the Cold War and bring together the major powers to discuss peace based on sustained global security. At this summit two "Eden Plans'' were proposed. The first focused on a possible limitation and inspection zone for West Germany as well as a call to demilitarize East Germany. The second plan proposed a zone of inspection along the line demarcating East and West Germany. The first plan was rejected by the Soviet Union as it was conditional on the necessity of German reunification, while the second was rejected by Western nations. This summit marked the first major conference to introduce the issue of disarmament between West and East Germans, and in turn, bringing to the attention of international forums the matters of sustained European security premised on this geographic region.

=== Poland and West German relations during the 1950s ===
During the mid-1950s, discussions in NATO arose over the possibility of giving West Germany nuclear weapons. This was, in part, driven by President Eisenhower seeking to extricate American troops from Europe. In Poland, there was much fear predominated that if the Germans were to receive such weapons, they could act aggressively to regain territories along the Oder and Lusatian Neisse Rivers that Poland had administered since the end of World War II. A formal treaty had not given the land to Poland, however, the Polish government had an agreement with East Germany granting the land as part of their own; something vehemently rejected by the West Germans.

Throughout 1955, the Polish government attempted to open diplomatic relations with the West Germans to no avail. This was in part due to the Polish recognition of East Germany, an act deemed unacceptable under the Hallstein Doctrine, adopted by the West German government at the time. Władysław Gomułka, first secretary of the Polish Workers Party, attempted to push for the formation of diplomatic relations in 1957 but was met with a negative reply similar to earlier attempts. With fears of West German revanchism to acquire lost territories in the East and NATO's pledges to provide nuclear weapons to the West German armies, the Poles became increasingly driven to propose a disarmament plan.

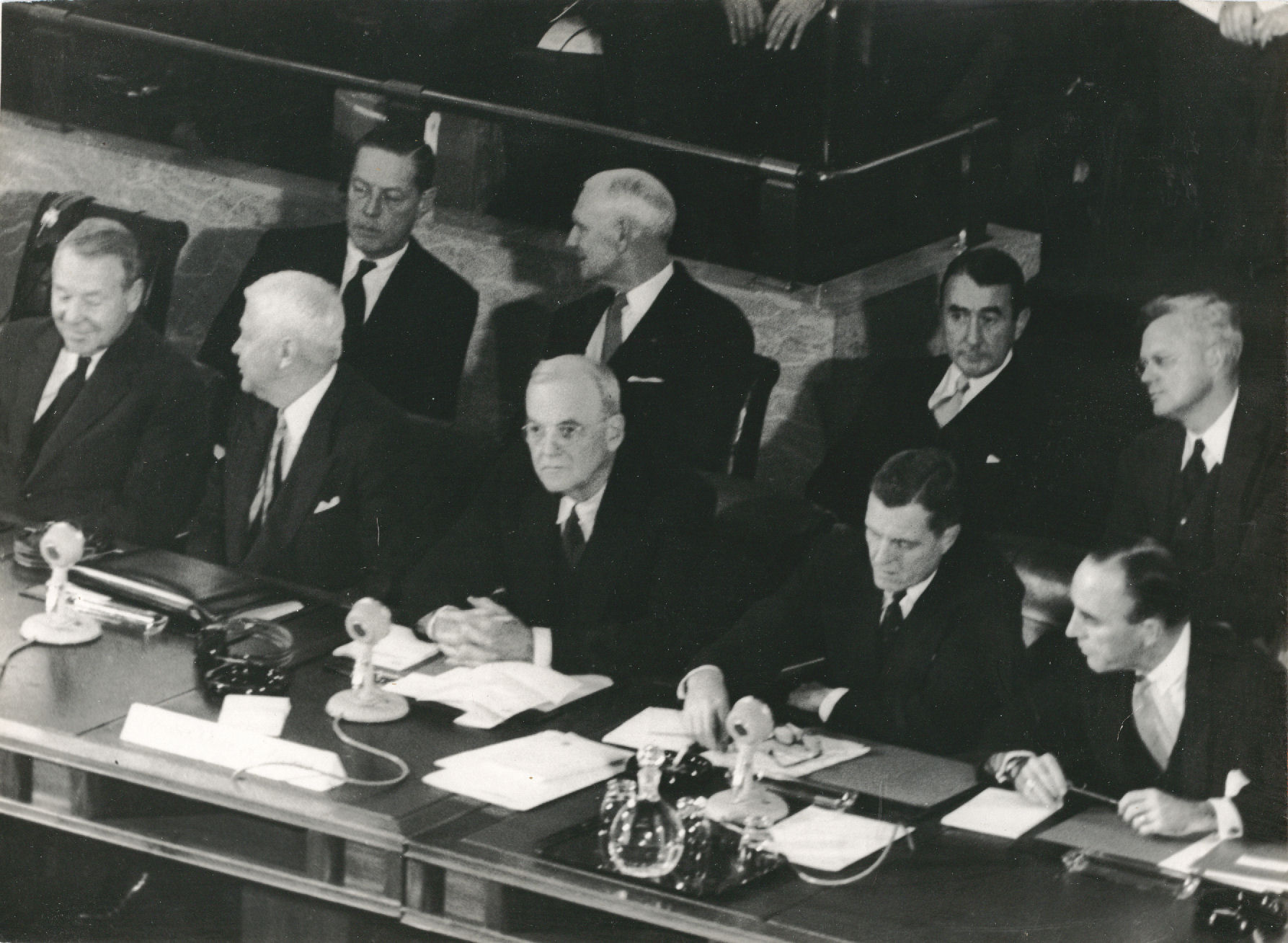
American delegation at the Geneva Summit 1955.

=== Soviet Attempts at Overture ===
Amid suppression of the Hungarian Revolt, the Soviet Union made several proposals for disarmament during the mid to late 1950s. In November 1956, the state introduced a disarmament plan before the United Nations General Assembly that focused on reducing men in armies of great powers, banning nuclear weapons, and an overall reduction in military expenditures in all countries. The plan was initially turned down by Western nations, but it was suggested that a more limited plan might be considered acceptable.

In the summer of 1957, the Soviet Union introduced a new limited disarmament plan before the U.N Disarmament Commission. The plan proposed armed force reductions for the U.S., China, Soviet Union, France, and Great Britain. The plan called for renouncing the use of nuclear weapons, and furthermore, a compliance system based on aerial photography of locations in Europe where the Warsaw Pact and NATO forces were stationed. The plan was ultimately rejected by the West once again. This then led the Polish government to suggest a disarmament plan of their own.

=== A Polish Proposal to the Soviets ===
The initial idea for a nuclear-free zone first appeared in the journal Swiat a Polska in early 1957. The Soviets were initially delayed in considering the Polish proposal, however, in September 1957 the Soviet Chargé d'affaires in Poland told the Deputy Foreign Minister of Poland, Minister Marian Naszkowski, that the Soviets sought to support the plan. The plan, with further development, would eventually take the name of former Polish Workers Party member Adam Rapacki.

== Rapacki's Presentation to the U.N Assembly, 2 October 1957 ==
Rapacki's proposal at the UN General Assembly was largely made in the context of disarmament and limited to an undertaking by Poland, Czechoslovakia, East and West Germany to refrain from importing, manufacturing, or maintaining nuclear weapons within their territories. In his speech, Rapacki focused on the proposal's value as a first step towards breaking the disarmament deadlock between the Soviet Union and the West and employed the term "constructive coexistence". Furthermore, he emphasized its separate nature from other proposals for neutralization, demilitarization, and European security suggested by the Soviets and Western nations. The speech also spoke to the potential consequences of nuclear weapons in Central Europe, and moreover indicated that the Polish delegation would give its unfettered support to any initiative that sought to curb nuclear testing.

== The Plan ==
Following the announcement of the Plan at the UN General Assembly, Rapacki sent a memorandum to the Warsaw embassies of Belgium, Canada, Denmark, France, the UK, the US, Czechoslovakia, the German Democratic Republic, the USSR, and Sweden on February 14, 1958, detailing how the arrangement of a zone of disarmament would work.

=== Main Clauses ===
1. The zone was defined as West Germany, East Germany, Poland, and Czechoslovakia, would ban the production and storage of nuclear weapons as well as the use of such weapons in the zone.
2. Commits the four powers (France, UK, US, USSR) to not bring nuclear weapons into the zone or use nuclear weapons against the countries inhabiting the zone; prohibits all countries who have military forces in the zone from possessing weapons.
3. Countries included in the zone would set up a control machinery to maintain the nuclear weapons ban including air and ground checks.
4. An international treaty would be the best way to commit states to the plan, however, if this is not possible multilateral or unilateral declarations between countries in the zone and the four powers are suggested.

== Responses to the Rapacki Plan ==
After the Rapacki plan was drafted by Foreign Minister Rapacki, Poland sought approval from its own allies in Eastern Europe (especially the Soviet Union) before presenting the plan to the United Nations, where both the United States and West Germany would decide on it. Despite the diplomacy of Adam Rapacki, the plan was ultimately rejected.

=== Czechoslovakia ===
In October 1957, the Czech government came out in favor of the plan with Vaclav David, the foreign minister, giving a speech about the state's interest in participating in a nuclear-free zone and subsequently added Czechoslovakia to the list of states participating in the Rapacki Plan. The speech also outlined how the Polish proposal was a constructive step towards disarmament of Central Europe more broadly.

=== Soviet Union ===
Soviet response to the plan was generally favorable from the beginning, especially when the plan aided in the Soviet's aims and problems. In 1957, the Soviet Union saw the plan as a means of tackling two of its most pressing issues. First, preventing West Germany from being able to arm itself with nuclear armaments. Second, it re-earned its own prestige after its aggressive suppression of the Hungarian Uprising in 1956, which after a United Nations investigation, concluded that Soviet involvement violated the human rights of the Hungarian people. On December 21, 1957, the Supreme Soviet passed a 17-point resolution that included a pact of non-aggression between Warsaw Pact states along with the Rapacki Plan. Throughout 1957–58, the Soviet Union thoroughly supported the plan. A meeting was set up between Adam Rapacki and Soviet Foreign Minister Andrei Gromyko in February 1958, which ended in favor of a nuclear-free zone as delineated in the plan. Later in March 1958, Nikita Khrushchev, First Secretary of the Communist Party of the Soviet Union, said in his speech at the Twenty-First Party Congress that the Soviet Union supported implementing the plan and creating an "atom-free zone" in Europe. Other Socialist states gave favorable responses in agreement with the plan as well.

=== United States ===
The Eisenhower Administration was unfavorable to any disarmament proposals in Europe and were suspicious of the intentions of Eastern Europe during the Cold War. With American nuclear armaments out of West Germany providing a counterpoint to the Soviet Union, it would leave the Soviets with military superiority in Europe. A spokesperson representing the Eisenhower administration expressed that the plan only served to benefit the Soviet Union. The plan would also hinder NATO's plans for enhancing the weapons systems and air force for nuclear armaments in the Federal Republic of Germany. According to some scholars, this would have disadvantaged the U.S. in their short range nuclear weapons protection plan for Western Europe. On January 10, 1958, John Foster Dulles held a press conference expressing antagonism against a nuclear-free zone in Western Europe, suggesting that neutralization of Germany would significantly hurt NATO. Dean Acheson, a former Secretary of State, would also come out against the Rapacki Plan two days later in the New York Times.

On May 3, 1958, United States Ambassador to Poland, Jacob D. Beam sent an official rejection to the plan based on the limitations of the plan in preventing nuclear war. Some scholars argue that the U.S. government believed that acceptance of the plan would ultimately usurp the balance of power in Europe. However, former American diplomat George Kennan, who also previously was against the establishment of NATO, contrary to the American politicians at the time, thought that the unification and disarmament of Germany would satisfy both the Germans and the concerns of the Soviet Union. Kennan also saw the plan as a starting point to ease disarmament in Germany.

=== East Germany ===
The East German government informed the UN that they were willing to sign an agreement with West Germany contingent on their renunciation of producing nuclear weapons based on the Polish proposal.

=== West Germany ===
West German responses were generally negative to the plan and were highly suspicious of the intentions of Eastern Europe – particularly that of the Soviet Union. East and West Germany had a highly strained relationship, especially with the Hallstein Doctrine in effect, establishing the accepted principle that West Germany would not have any relations with states that recognized East Germany. The plan which would include the denuclearization of both West and East Germany would mean that West Germany would effectively acknowledge the legitimacy of the East Berlin government. The West German government was also operating in a contrary direction to the plan as Chancellor Konrad Adenauer won a re-election campaign to allow nuclear armament of the German armed forces, the Bundeswehr.

=== United Kingdom ===
The British government appeared to be sympathetic with the Polish proposal, however, ultimately found the Rapacki Plan unacceptable. On November 19, 1958, Foreign Minister Selwyn Lloyd made a statement that the Poles were sincere in their attempts for nuclear disarmament in Western Europe, however, the British government could not support such a nuclear-free zone.

=== Canada ===
Unlike most other NATO members, Canada was initially sympathetic to the Polish proposal. Wary at first that the Plan was a front for greater Warsaw Pact aims, the country began to speak positively about it when it ascertained greater confidence that the venture was born independently in Poland. Canadian officials seemed to appreciate the fact that Poland was asserting sovereignty outside of the Warsaw Pact, and believed that supporting the Plan would both further their independence and strengthen the dialogue between NATO and the Soviet Union. Some Canadians in government such as Jules Leger, the Undersecretary of State for External Affairs, openly defended the Rapacki Plan, and thought it to be an effort worth pursuing. However, the country could not agree to certain details of the plan; including the lack of a controls regime, and ultimately, voted with the rest of NATO to reject it.

Canada later sought to create a counterproposal after the Plan's rejection in 1958. A tentative agreement was created with Norway that would ban some strategic weapons and stop nuclear weapons production in Eastern Europe, and thus, living up to the spirit of the Rapacki Plan. However, this too was deemed to weaken Western defense too greatly and was subsequently rejected by NATO.

Eventually, Canada reversed its position on European denuclearization. Scholars suggest that the country began to fear that such proposals would increase nuclear proliferation rather than limit it, as they had the potential to prompt European nations to develop their own armaments rather than rely singularly on the U.S. This fear was realized in 1959 when France began its own nuclear weapons program.

== Notable Figures ==
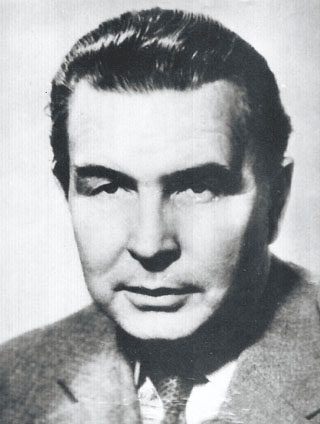
Adam Rapacki, Polish Minister of Foreign Affairs from 1956 - 1968

=== Adam Rapacki ===
Adam Rapacki was initially a socialist agitator who later became part of the Polish Workers Party after World War II. As the Minister of Foreign Affairs from 1956 to 1968, his most notable contribution was his "Rapacki Plan" – a plan for a nuclear-free zone in Central Europe.

Rapacki attempted to keep open diplomatic, cultural, and commercial connections with the West while supporting Soviet policies in the UN, and furthermore, supporting the viewpoints of other communist countries during his tenure as the Minister of Foreign Affairs. Rapacki rose to fame in 1957 when he submitted the Rapacki Plan to the United Nations General Assembly on October 2 calling for a denuclearized zone to be established. Rapacki was eventually relieved of his duties as foreign minister on Dec. 20, 1968.

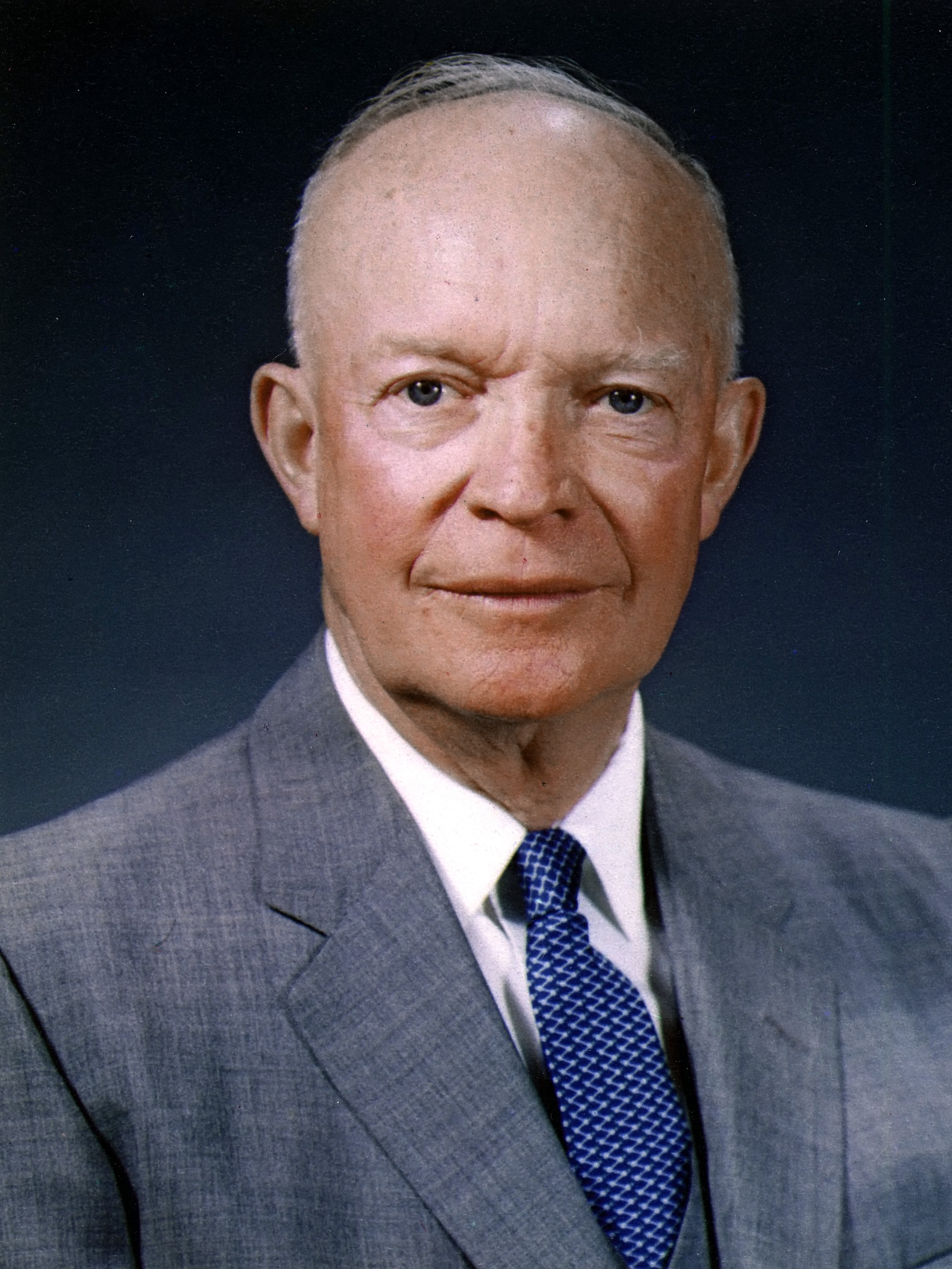
Dwight D. Eisenhower, 34th President of the United States.

=== Dwight D. Eisenhower ===
During the Cold War, President Eisenhower attempted to negotiate European security from a position of military strength through NATO. In 1953, with Joseph Stalin dying, a large shift in relations between the Soviet Union and both the U.S. and NATO occurred. In the mid-1950s, seeking to pull troops out of Europe, Eisenhower pushed for the greater nuclear armament of Western European countries, notably that of West Germany. This would eventually precipitate a nuclear disarmament overture by the Soviets, and notably, the Polish with their Rapacki plan. However, the President would openly advocate against the Plan citing the lack of effort to reunify Germany and how it would greatly weaken NATO's position in Europe.

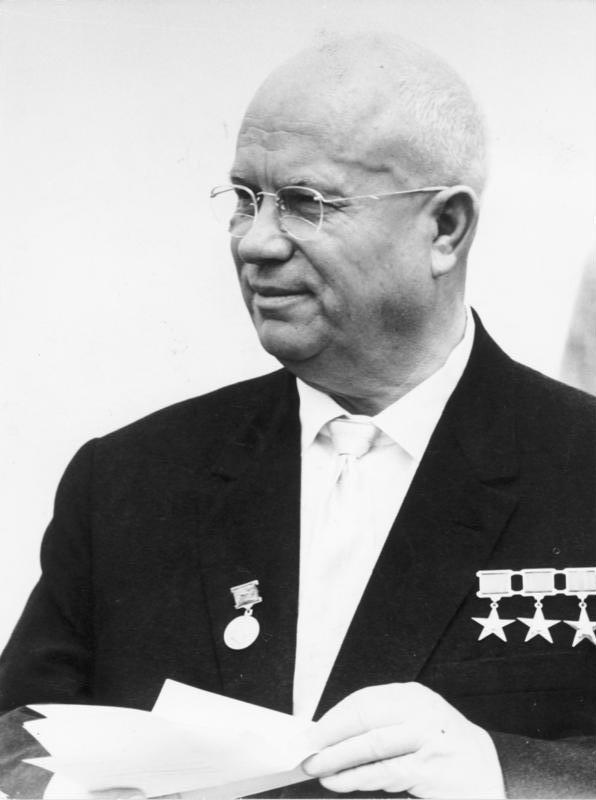
Nikita Khrushchev, Soviet Union's First Secretary of the Communist Party

=== Nikita Khrushchev ===
Nikita Khrushchev, serving as the Soviet Union's First Secretary of the Communist Party at the time, sought closer cooperation between the Soviet and Polish governments from 1956 onwards. With greater diplomatic ties established in the years following, Khrushchev, in an interview for a newspaper published by the Polish Workers Party in 1958, stated that the Rapacki Plan was the best example of their states' ties and working relationship. At his speech for the Twenty-First Party Congress, he stated how the Soviets were very much willing to implement the plan.

=== Przemysław Ogrodziński ===
Przemysław Ogrodziński, a socialist activist and Polish diplomat, rose to the position of Director-General of the Ministry of Foreign Affairs during Rapacki's tenure. He was a key member of Rapacki's core team, alongside Manfred Lachs, in charge of the political department within the ministry, and Henryk Birecki, head of the legal department. He is noted as being one of the masterminds behind the contents of the Rapacki Plan.

=== Władysław Gomułka ===
In 1956, Władysław Gomułka was put in power as the leader of the Polish United Workers' Party (PZPR) after having been one of Poland's key post-war politicians. He used his position to assert Poland's independence from the Soviet Union and Warsaw pact, which included his sponsorship of Rapacki's denuclearization plan in 1957, despite a less-than-intimate relationship with Rapacki himself.

While Gomulka's policies were eventually approved by Moscow, his aggressive style of independence in pursuing programs like the Rapacki Plan later soured his relations with fellow Warsaw Pact leaders.

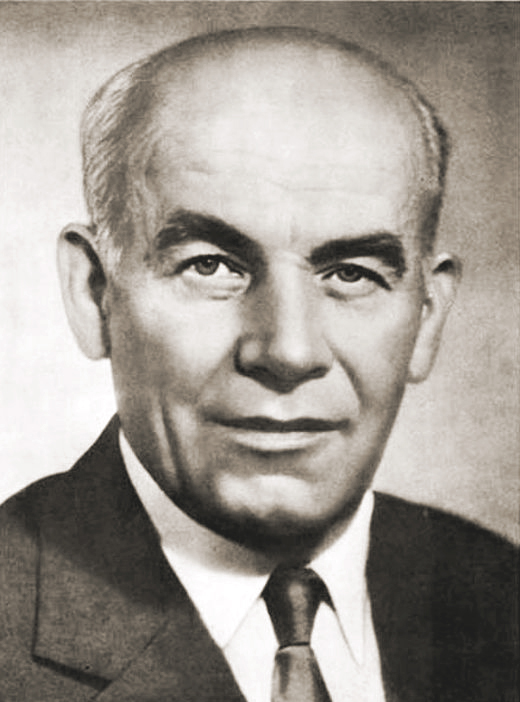
Władysław Gomułka, Former Leader of the Polish United Workers' Party

== Legacy ==
=== Gomułka Plan ===
After 1958, Poland persisted in its attempts to create a nuclear free zone in central Europe. In December 1963, Poland proposed the unsuccessful Gomułka Plan, which sought to halt further nuclear proliferation in the same Central European region as the Rapacki Plan.

=== Future Disarmament ===
Despite the fact that both the Rapacki and Gomułka plans were rejected, scholars argue that both contributed to the discussion on nuclear disarmament between the Cold War superpowers and had an impact on the adjacent topics of nuclear test bans and east–west non-aggression pacts. Eventually, the discussion culminated in the Nuclear Non-Proliferation Treaty of 1968 and the Conventional Forces in Europe (CFE) Treaty in 1990.
