= Berlin Crisis of 1961 =

Cold War incident in divided Berlin

- Part of the Cold War
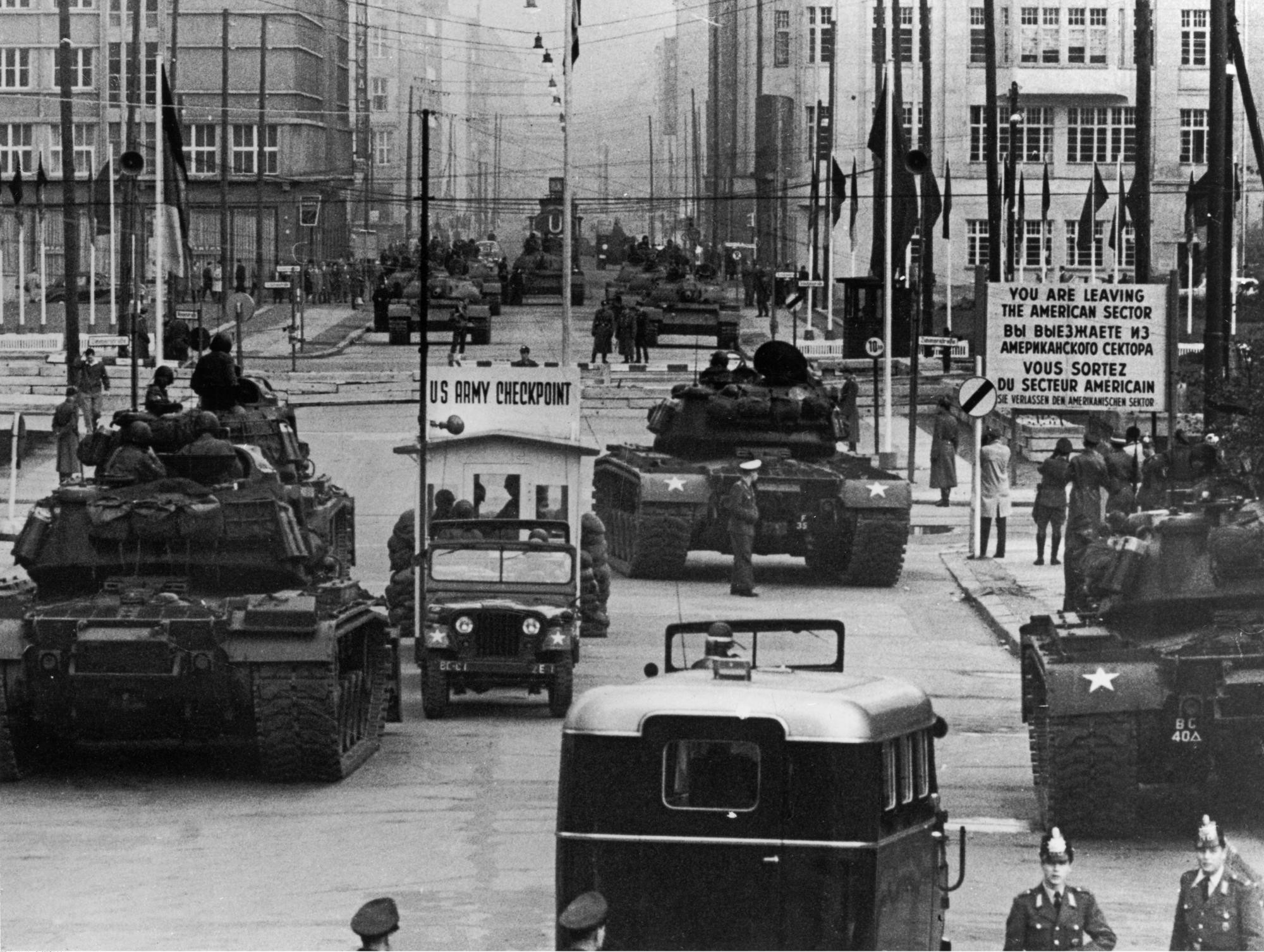
- U.S. M48 tanks face Soviet T-54 tanks at Checkpoint Charlie, October 1961.
Date	4 June – 9 November 1961
Location	Checkpoint Charlie, Berlin
Result	Stalemate: Erection of the Berlin Wall on 12–13 August 1961

Belligerents
Soviet Union; East Germany; Supported by: Warsaw Pact (except Albania)	United States; West Germany; Supported by: NATO

Commanders and leaders
(Soviet Union) Nikita Khrushchev (East Germany) Walter Ulbricht	(United States) John F. Kennedy (West Germany) Konrad Adenauer

The Berlin Crisis of 1961 (German: Berlin-Krise) was the last major European political and military incident of the Cold War concerning the status of the German capital city, Berlin, and of post–World War II Germany. The crisis culminated in the city's de facto partition by the East German erection of the Berlin Wall.

The Berlin Crisis of 1961 was the second attempt by Soviet Premier Nikita Khrushchev to change the status of Berlin by demanding the withdrawal of all armed forces from the city and stopping the mass exodus of East Germans fleeing to the West. After the failure of his first ultimatum in 1958, Khrushchev renewed his demands at the 1961 Vienna summit, this time challenging the newly inaugurated U.S. president John F. Kennedy. Previously, in 1948 and 1949 Krushchev's predecessor Joseph Stalin had tried and also failed to change the status of Berlin with the Berlin Blockade.

When talks broke down and no agreement was reached, in August 1961 East German leader Walter Ulbricht, with Khrushchev's backing, ordered the closing of the border and the construction of a wall surrounding West Berlin. A brief stand-off between American and Soviet tanks occurred at Checkpoint Charlie in October after a dispute about free movement of Allied personnel; the confrontation ended peacefully after Khrushchev and Kennedy agreed to withdraw the tanks and reduce tensions.

== History ==
=== East German exodus ===
After the Second World War, Germany and its capital, Berlin, were divided by the victors. The Western part of the country was occupied by the United States, United Kingdom and France, while the East was controlled by the USSR. This was the case in Berlin as well.

By 1958, East German leader Walter Ulbricht was struggling to maintain control of the German state. East Germany was facing economic hardships and shortages brought on by the war and the reparations demanded by the Soviet Union. Skilled and educated workers sought better opportunities by crossing the border into the West. Since 1949, 2.5 million people had fled this way. This exodus of skilled workers led to further economic pressures for the East German government, while signs of increasing public unrest became harder to ignore. Ulbricht sought assistance from Khrushchev, who said this "simply disastrous situation" threatened East German stability and the Soviet Union's efforts to consolidate control of the Eastern bloc.

=== Berlin ultimatum ===
==== 1958 ====
In November 1958, Nikita Khrushchev presented the first ultimatum to the Western allies, demanding a solution to the status of Germany with a deadline of six months. The proposal demanded the western allies sign a separate peace treaty with West and East Germany. If they failed to do so, Khrushchev threatened to sign a separate peace with East Germany, recognising it as an independent state, and declare Berlin a free city with East Germany holding exclusive access to the city via air, land and sea. The consequence of this would force the allies to withdraw from the city, thereby demilitarizing it and ultimately giving East Germany and by extension the USSR sole control over Berlin. However the ultimatum failed due to the joint allied effort to maintain the Potsdam order, which was achieved through continued military presence, the refusal to recognise East Germany and active diplomacy. A significant diplomatic moment occurred in 1959 at a summit at Camp David where U.S. President Eisenhower met with Soviet Premier Khrushchev. While no immediate resolution was reached it did ease tensions and opened the door for future negotiations.

After Khrushchev's meeting with Eisenhower at Camp David, a summit in Paris was scheduled for May 1960 to further discuss the status of Berlin and disarmament. However, just days before the summit a U.S. U-2 spy plane piloted by Gary Powers was shot down over Soviet airspace. Khrushchev viewed this as a betrayal by Eisenhower and demanded an apology from the US president. When no apology came, the Soviet Union withdrew from the conference, effectively collapsing the Paris summit. The incident was used by the Soviet Union for propaganda purposes which further sowed the seeds of distrust between the two powers.

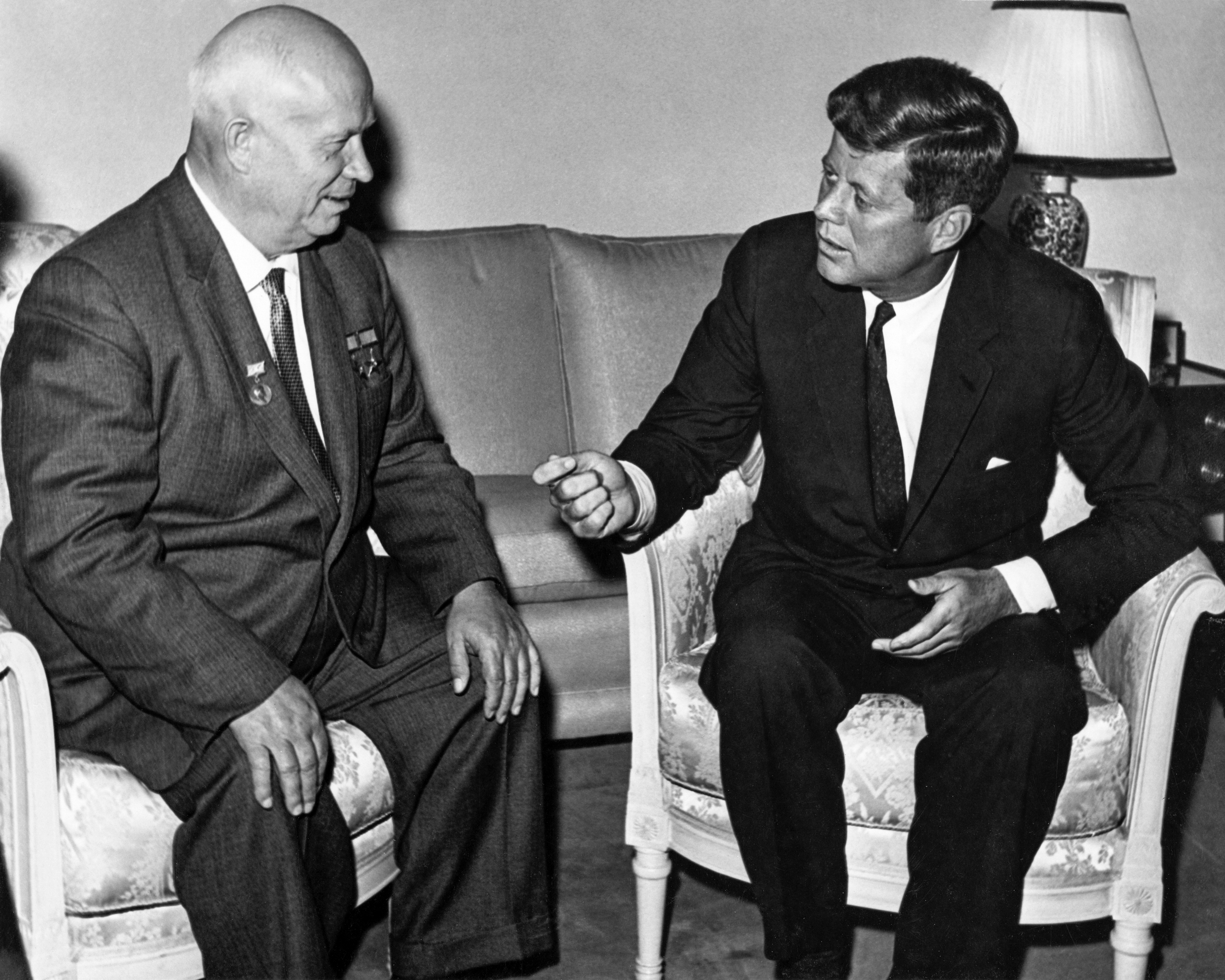
President John F. Kennedy meets with Soviet First Secretary Nikita Khrushchev in Vienna 1961

==== 1961 ====
Shortly after the inauguration of John F. Kennedy, a summit in Vienna was held between the United States and the Soviet Union. Both leaders had several objectives they wished to achieve.

For Kennedy, the summit was an opportunity to recover his credibility and authority following the failed Bay of Pigs invasion, which had cast him as weak and indecisive in the eyes of both the Soviet Union and his own allies, as well as the press and domestic critics. He was determined to prove to Khrushchev that, despite his youth and relative inexperience, he was a strong, resolute leader and a 'man of decision.' Additionally, Kennedy aimed to affirm the United States' commitment to maintain its presence in Berlin, thereby convincing Khrushchev of American resolve.

On the other hand, Khrushchev's main objective was to reaffirm his demands regarding the status of Berlin and the separate peace treaty with East Germany, as he had done with Eisenhower in 1958. He also sought to test Kennedy's resolve and political maturity by pressuring him to concede to Soviet demands. A diplomatic victory at the summit would not only enhance Khrushchev's prestige among Soviet hardliners but also boost his standing within the broader communist world, particularly with Mao Zedong.

Although nuclear testing and disarmament were also discussed, these topics were overshadowed by the tensions surrounding Berlin. The summit concluded with an 'almost total lack of substantive agreement' on any of the key issues raised. Kennedy left the summit feeling beaten, shaken and angry after enduring the relentless verbal assault from Khrushchev.

=== Rising tensions ===
In the growing confrontation over the status of Berlin, Kennedy undercut his own bargaining position during his Vienna summit negotiations with Khrushchev in June 1961. Kennedy essentially conveyed US acquiescence to the permanent division of Berlin. This made his later, more assertive public statements less credible to the Soviets. Kennedy decided on a flexible policy proposed by his younger advisors, with only a few concessions to the hardliners around Dean Acheson. The United States now defined three vital interests in its policy for Berlin, and linked all of them only to the western part of the city: the presence of Western troops in West Berlin; the security and viability of the western sectors; and Western access to them.

As the confrontation over Berlin escalated, Kennedy delivered on July 25 a television speech in Washington on CBS, and broadcast nationwide in the US. He reiterated that the United States was not looking for a fight and that he recognized the "Soviet Union's historical concerns about their security in central and eastern Europe." He said he was willing to renew talks, but he also announced that he would ask Congress for an additional $3.25 billion for military spending, mostly on conventional weapons. He wanted six new divisions for the Army and two for the Marines, and he announced plans to triple the draft and to call up the reserves. Kennedy proclaimed: "We seek peace, but we shall not surrender."

Vacationing in the Black Sea resort of Sochi, Khrushchev was reported to be angered by Kennedy's speech. John Jay McCloy, Kennedy's disarmament adviser, who happened to be in the Soviet Union, was invited to join Khrushchev. It is reported that Khrushchev explained to McCloy that Kennedy's military build-up threatened war.

=== Plans for the Berlin Wall ===
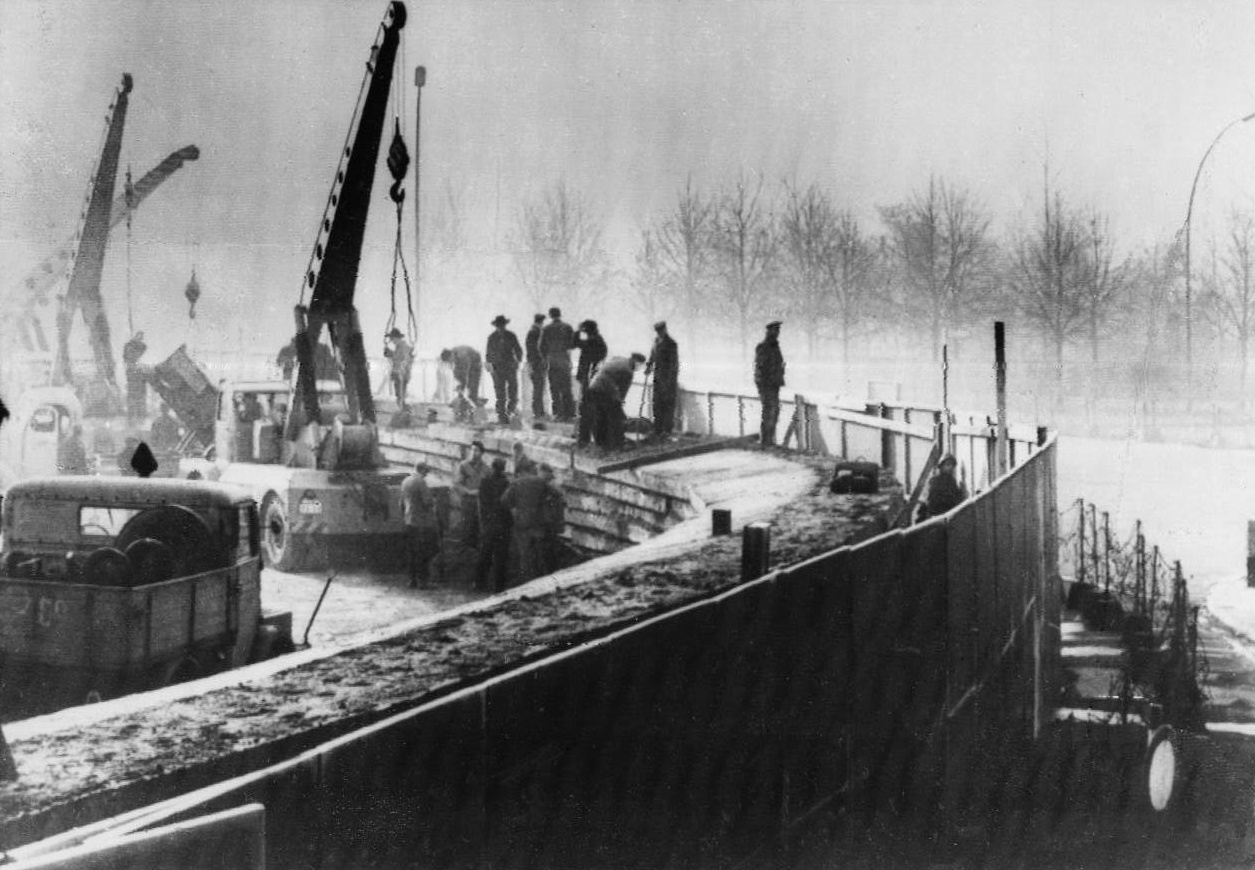
East German construction workers building the Berlin Wall in 1961

In early 1961, the East German government sought a way to stop its population leaving for the West. Walter Ulbricht, First Secretary of the Socialist Unity Party (SED) and Staatsrat chairman and thus East Germany's chief decision-maker, convinced the Soviet Union that force was necessary to stop this movement, although Berlin's four-power status required the allowance of free travel between zones and forbade the presence of German troops in Berlin.

The East German government began stockpiling building materials for the erection of the Berlin Wall; this activity was widely known, but only a small circle of Soviet and East German planners believed that East Germans were aware of the purpose. This material included enough barbed wire to enclose the 156 km (97 mi) circumference of West Berlin. The regime managed to avoid suspicion by spreading out the purchases of barbed wire among several East German companies, which in turn spread their orders out among a range of firms in West Germany and the United Kingdom.

On 15 June 1961, less than two months before the construction of the Berlin Wall started, Walter Ulbricht stated in an international press conference: "Niemand hat die Absicht, eine Mauer zu errichten!" ("No one has the intention to erect a wall"). It was the first time the term Mauer (wall) had been used in this context.

On 4–7 August 1961, the foreign ministers of the US, UK, France, and West Germany secretly met in Paris to discuss how to respond to the Soviet actions in West Berlin. They expressed a lack of willingness to engage in warfare. Within weeks, the KGB provided Khrushchev with descriptions of the Paris talks. These showed that US Secretary of State Dean Rusk, unlike the West Germans, supported talks with the Soviet Union, though the KGB and the GRU warned that the US was being pressured by other members of the alliance to consider economic sanctions against East Germany and other socialist countries and to move faster on plans for conventional and nuclear armament of their allies in Western Europe, such as the West German Bundeswehr.

The West had advance intelligence about the construction of the Wall. On 6 August, a human intelligence source, a functionary in the SED, provided the 513th Military Intelligence Group (Berlin) with the correct date of the start of construction. At a weekly meeting of the Berlin Watch Committee on 9 August 1961, the Chief of the US Military Liaison Mission to the Commander Group of Soviet Forces Germany predicted the construction of a wall. An intercept of SED communications on the same day informed the West that there were plans to begin blocking all foot traffic between East and West Berlin. The interagency intelligence Watch Committee assessment said that this intercept "might be the first step in a plan to close the border", which turned out to be correct.

=== Closing of the border ===
On Saturday 12 August 1961, the leaders of East Germany attended a garden party at a government guesthouse in Döllnsee, in a wooded area to the north of East Berlin, and Walter Ulbricht signed the order to close the border and erect a Wall around West Berlin.

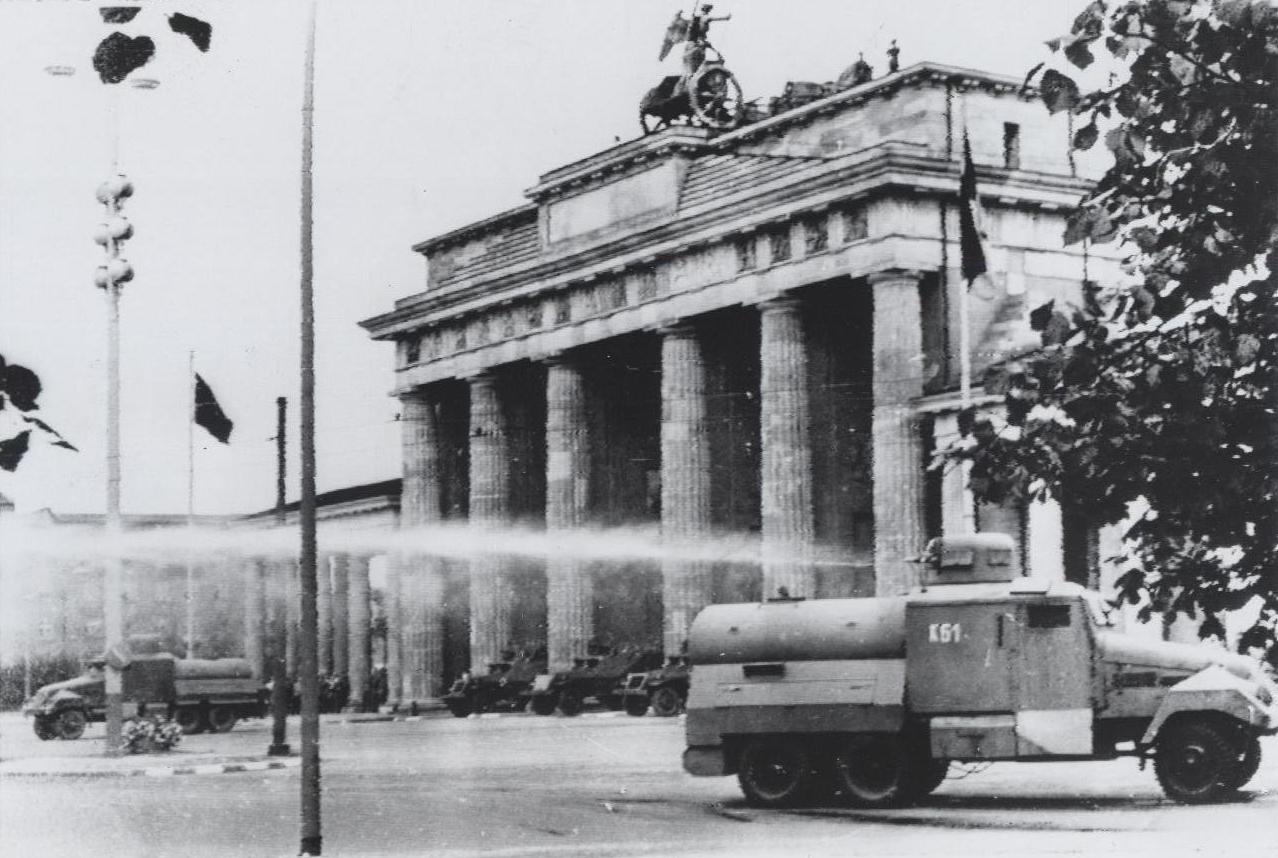
East German water cannons near the Brandenburg Gate spray high-pressure water at West Berliners protesting the division of their city, 14 August 1961

At midnight, East Germany's border police, the East German army and units of the Soviet Army began to close the border; by morning on Sunday 13 August 1961, the border to West Berlin had been shut. East German troops and workers had begun to tear up streets running alongside the barrier to make them impassable to most vehicles, and to install barbed wire entanglements and fences along the 156 km (97 mi) around the three western sectors and the 43 km (27 mi) which actually divided West and East Berlin. Approximately 32,000 troops were employed for the building of the Wall, after which the Border Police became responsible for manning and improving it. To discourage Western interference and perhaps control potential riots, the Soviet Army was present.

On 18 August 1961, Chancellor Konrad Adenauer issued a statement to the Bundestag denouncing the construction of the wall by East German authorities. Adenauer stated the wall is a direct violation of "human rights and the Four-Power status of Berlin." He emphasized the detrimental consequences of a potential war with the Soviet Union, and that using negotiations could resolve the issue in a nonviolent manner. Adenauer concluded his speech by expressing his commitment to working toward a peaceful solution.

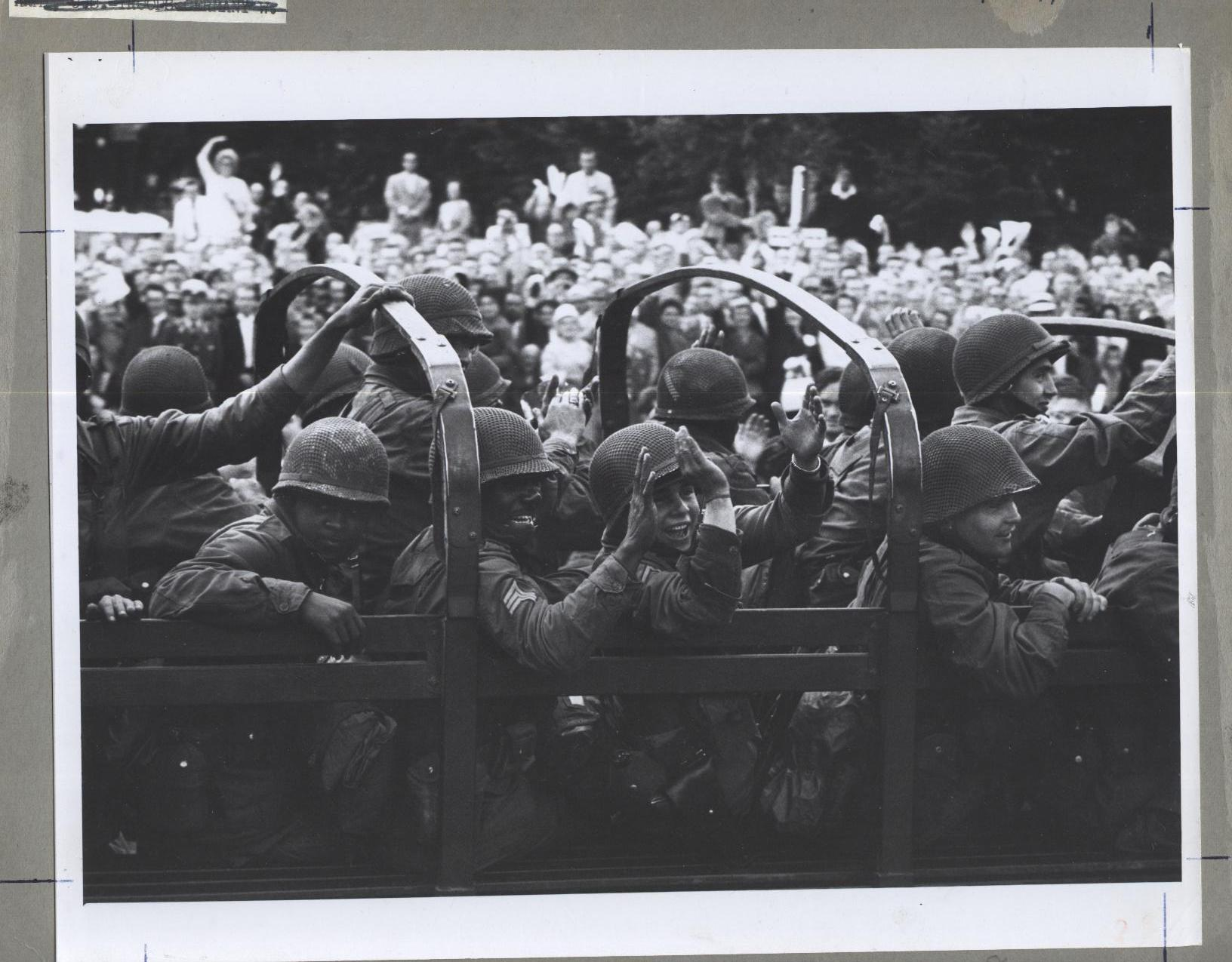
West Berliners welcome the arrival of American reinforcements from the First Battle Group, 18th Infantry Regiment, 20 August 1961

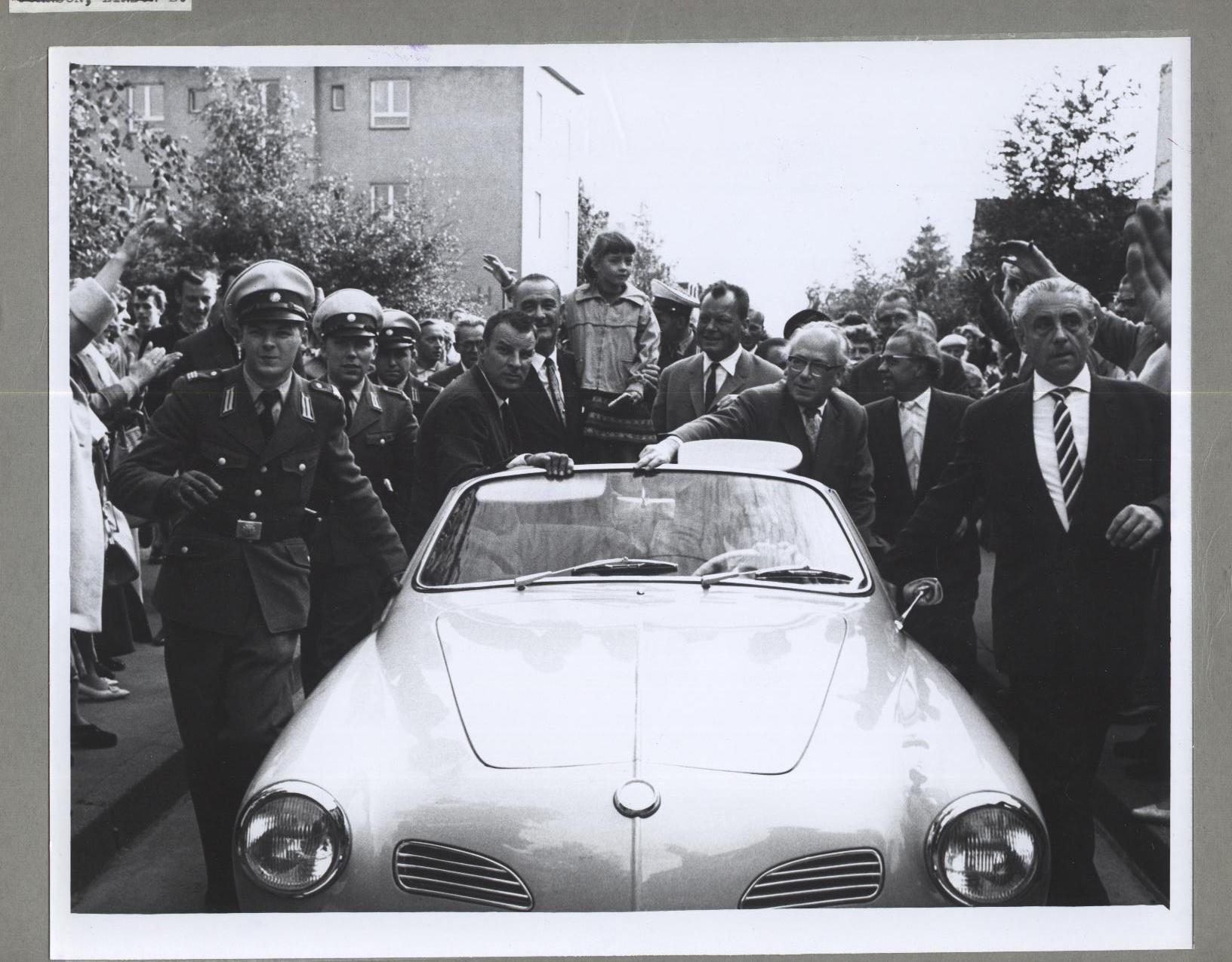
Accompanied by a young refugee from East Germany, U. S. Vice President Lyndon B. Johnson greets the crowds at the Marienfelde refugee transit camp during his visit to West Berlin, 20 August 1961

Kennedy did not give in to angry demands for immediate action raised by West Berliners and their mayor, Willy Brandt. Instead, he sent vice president Lyndon B. Johnson together with Lucius D. Clay, the hero of the Berlin Airlift of 1948‒49, to West Berlin on 19 August. They managed to calm the population and demonstrate symbolically the United States' solidarity with the city. On 20 August, 1,500 additional American soldiers (1st Battle Group, 18th Infantry Regiment (reinforced) from 8th Infantry Division, moving from the Mannheim in a convoy of 491 vehicles and trailers) arrived in West Berlin.

On 30 August 1961, in response to moves by the Soviet Union to cut off access to Berlin, President Kennedy ordered 148,000 Guardsmen and Reservists to active duty. In October and November, more Air National Guard units were mobilised, and 216 aircraft from the tactical fighter units flew to Europe in operation "Stair Step", the largest jet deployment in the history of the Air Guard. Most of the mobilised Air Guardsmen remained in the US, while some others had been trained for delivery of tactical nuclear weapons and had to be retrained in Europe for conventional operations. The Air National Guard's ageing F-84s and F-86s required spare parts that the United States Air Forces in Europe lacked.

Richard Bach wrote his book Stranger to the Ground centred around his experience as an Air National Guard pilot on this deployment.

=== Berlin travel disputes ===
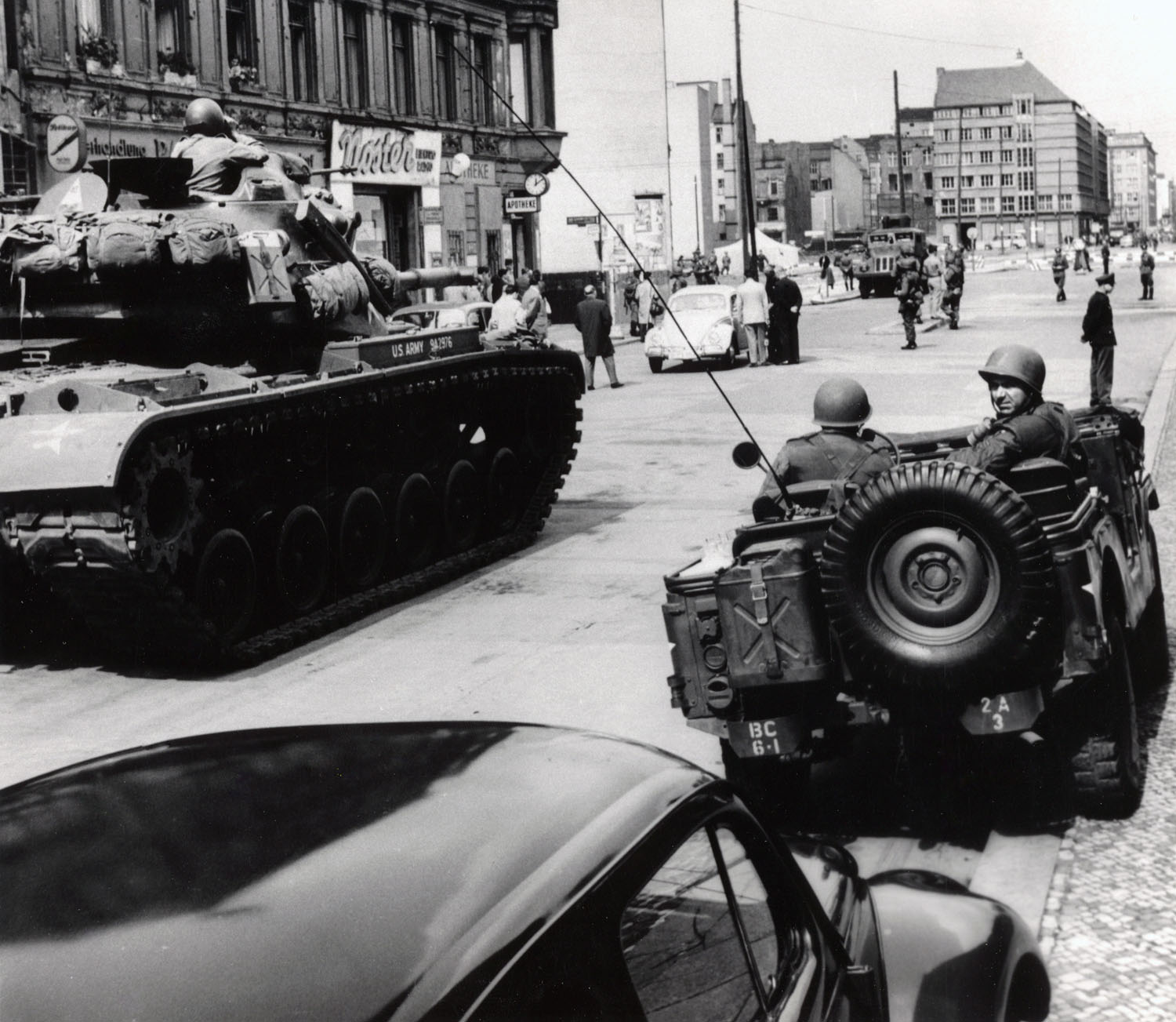
American tanks face an East German water cannon at Checkpoint Charlie.

The four powers governing Berlin (Soviet Union, United States, United Kingdom, and France) had agreed at the 1945 Potsdam Conference that Allied personnel could move freely in any sector of Berlin. But on 22 October 1961, just two months after the construction of the Wall, the US Chief of Mission in West Berlin, E. Allan Lightner, was stopped in his car (which had occupation forces license plates) while crossing at Checkpoint Charlie to go to a theatre in East Berlin. President John F. Kennedy worked closely with retired Army General Lucius D. Clay, who had been in charge of the Berlin Airlift of 1948–1949. They decided to demonstrate American resolve. The American command in the West Berlin garrison considered a plan to pull down the wire and barricades with bulldozers. This, however, was overruled by the troop commander, Brigadier General Frederick O. Hartel. General Clay went to Berlin for 10 months.

=== Military stand-off ===
US Commandant General Watson was outraged by the East Berlin police's attempt to control the passage of American military forces. He communicated to the Department of State on 25 October 1961 that Soviet Commandant Colonel Solovyev and his men were not doing their part to avoid disturbing actions during a time of peace negotiations, and demanded that the Soviet authorities take immediate steps to remedy the situation. Solovyev replied by describing American attempts to send armed soldiers across the checkpoint and keeping American tanks at sector boundary as an "open provocation" and a direct violation of GDR regulations. He insisted that properly identified American military could cross the sector border without impediments, and were only stopped when their nationality was not immediately clear to guards. Solovyev contended that requesting identifying paperwork from those crossing the border was not unreasonable control; Watson disagreed. In regard to the American military presence on the border, Solovyev warned:

I am authorized to state that it is necessary to avoid actions of this kind. Such actions can provoke corresponding actions from our side. We have tanks too. We hate the idea of carrying out such actions, and are sure that you will re-examine your course.

Perhaps this contributed to Albert Hemsing's, General Clay's Press Officer, decision to make the attempt again: on 27 October 1961, Hemsing again approached the zonal boundary in a diplomatic vehicle, after two prior successful attempts. General Clay sent ten jeeps with infantry troops to escort Hemsing through East Berlin and ten M48 tanks, some fitted with bulldozer blades, close to Checkpoint Charlie.

External images
- US tanks (foreground) face Soviet tanks at Checkpoint Charlie, on 27–28 October 1961
- US Tanks facing Soviet Tanks in Berlin 27 October 1961

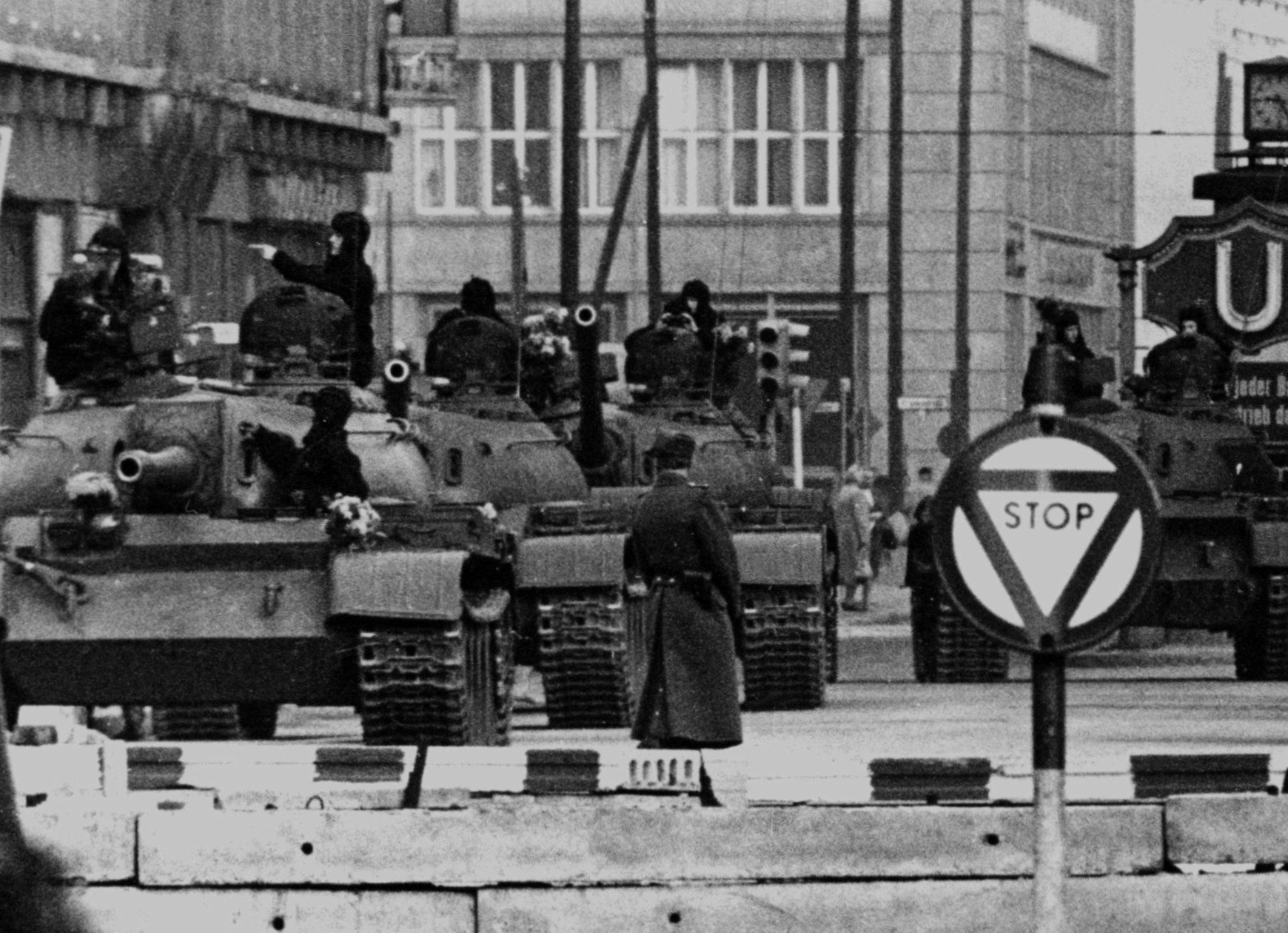
Soviet T-54 tanks at Checkpoint Charlie, October 27, 1961.

Immediately afterwards, 33 T-54 Soviet tanks drove to the Brandenburg Gate. As one of the first to spot the tanks when they arrived, Lieutenant Vern Pike was ordered to verify whether they were indeed Soviet tanks. He and tank driver Sam McCart drove over to East Berlin, where Pike took advantage of a temporary absence of any soldiers near the tanks to climb into one of them. He came out with definitive evidence that the tanks were Soviet, including a Red Army newspaper.

Ten of these tanks continued to Friedrichstraße, and stopped just 50 to 100 metres from the checkpoint on the Soviet side of the sector boundary. The US tanks moved towards the checkpoint, stopping an equal distance from it on the American side of the boundary. From 27 October 1961 at 17:00 until 28 October 1961 at about 11:00, the respective troops faced each other. As per standing orders, both groups of tanks were loaded with live munitions. The alert levels of the US Garrison in West Berlin, then NATO, and finally the US Strategic Air Command (SAC) were raised.

It was at this point that US Secretary of State Dean Rusk conveyed to General Lucius Clay, the US commanding officer in Berlin, that "We had long since decided that Berlin is not a vital interest which would warrant determined recourse to force to protect and sustain." Clay was convinced that having US tanks use bulldozer mounts to knock down parts of the Wall would have ended the crisis to the greater advantage of the US and its allies without eliciting a Soviet military response. Frederick Kempe argues that Rusk's views support a more unfavorable assessment of Kennedy's decisions during the crisis and his willingness to accept the Wall as the best solution.

The United States deployed the Davy Crockett tactical nuclear recoilless gun during the Berlin crisis of 1961, according to Brigadier General Alvin Cowan, Assistant Division Commander of the United States 3rd Armored Division, at the Tactical Nuclear Weapons Symposium of 1969. According to Cowan, the device was retired, in part, because "it was essentially a platoon weapon," and there was apparently "great fear that some sergeant would start a nuclear war."

=== Resolution ===
With GRU spy Georgi Bolshakov serving as the primary channel of communication, Khrushchev and Kennedy agreed to reduce tensions by withdrawing the tanks. The Soviet checkpoint had direct communications to General Anatoly Gribkov at the Soviet Army High Command, who in turn was on the phone to Khrushchev. The US checkpoint contained a Military Police officer on the telephone to the HQ of the US Military Mission in Berlin, which in turn was in communication with the White House. Kennedy offered to go easy over Berlin in the future in return for the Soviets removing their tanks first. The Soviets agreed. Kennedy stated concerning the Wall: "It's not a very nice solution, but a wall is a hell of a lot better than a war."

A Soviet tank moved about 5 metres backwards first; then an American tank followed suit. One by one the tanks withdrew. But General Bruce C. Clarke, then the Commander-in-Chief (CINC) of US Army Europe (USAREUR), was said to have been concerned about General Clay's conduct and Clay returned to the United States in May 1962. Gen. Clarke's assessment may have been incomplete, however: Clay's firmness had a great effect on the German population, led by West Berlin Mayor Willy Brandt and West German Chancellor Konrad Adenauer.

== See also ==
- Berlin Crisis of 1958–1959
- Escape attempts and victims of the inner German border
- Republikflucht Flight from East Germany
- History of Berlin
- Nikita Khrushchev
- Presidency of Dwight D. Eisenhower
- Presidency of John F. Kennedy
