= Gromeko =

Gromeko or Gromyko may refer to:

- Andrei Gromyko (1909–1989), Soviet Belarusian diplomat
- Gromeko family, fictional foster family of Yuri Zhivago in Doctor Zhivago by Boris Pasternak
