= Lydia Gromyko =

Wife of Andrey Gromyko (1911–2004)

- Лидия Громыко
- Born: Lydia Dmitrievna Grinevich; 14 April 1911; Minsk Governorate, Russian Empire
- Died: 9 March 2004 (aged 92); Moscow, Russia
- Education: Minsk Institute of Agricultural Science
- Known for: Wife of Andrei Gromyko
- Children: 2

Lydia Dmitrievna Gromyko (Russian: Лидия Дмитриевна Громыко; Belarusian: Лідзія Дзмітрыеўна Грамыка; née Grinevich [Гриневич]; 14 April 1911 – 9 March 2004) was a Soviet and Belarusian teacher who was the wife of Soviet diplomat Andrei Gromyko (1909–1989).

== Biography ==
Lydia Dmitrievna Grinevich was born in a village in Minsk Governorate on 14 April 1911. She was a daughter of Belarusian peasants.

She met Andrei Gromyko in Minsk where they were both studying agriculture at the Minsk Institute of Agricultural Science. They married in 1931. The marriage was harmonious and affectionate. They had two children: a son, Anatoly, and a daughter, Emilia. Anatoly (1932–2017) served as a diplomat and was an academic.

Lydia worked as a teacher and was fluent in English. In addition, she was learned in politics and literature. Her major interest was painting. Her husband was long serving Minister of Foreign Affairs of the Soviet Union and member of the Politburo and the Chairman of the Presidium of the Supreme Soviet of the Soviet Union from 2 July 1985 to 1 October 1988. She was regularly seen in public which was not common in the Soviet Union. There were rumours that she and Raisa Gorbacheva did not get along. Lydia died on 9 March 2004, at the age of 92.
