= Anatoly Gromyko =

Soviet and Russian scientist/diplomat (1932–2017)

- Анатолий Громыко
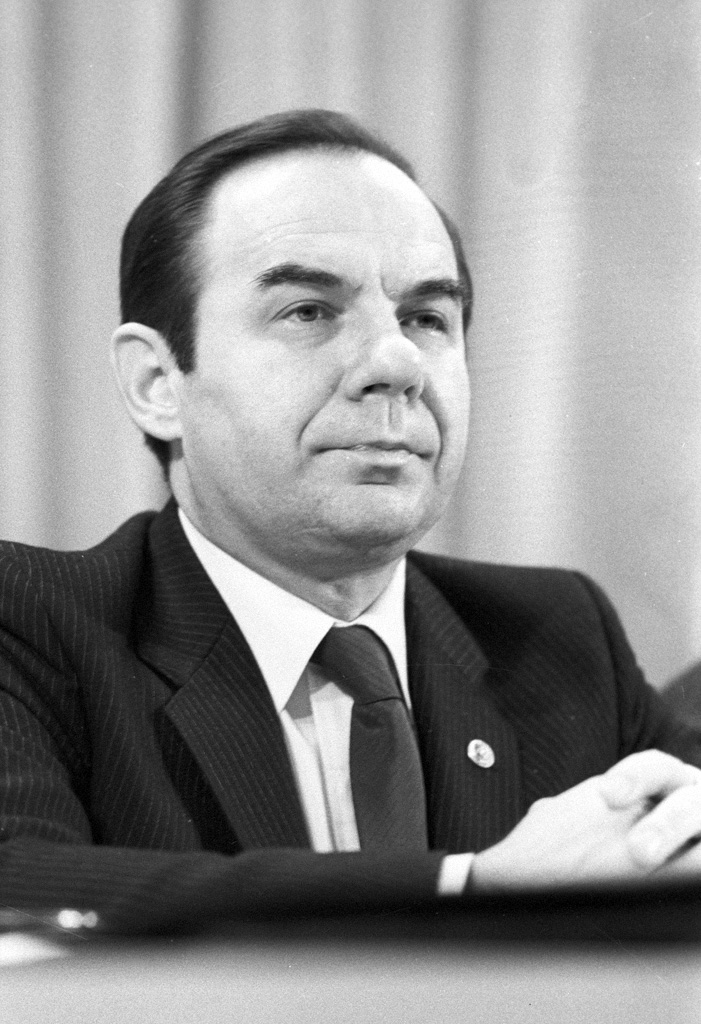
- Gromyko in 1983
- Born: 15 April 1932; Barysaw, Byelorussian SSR, Soviet Union
- Died: 25 September 2017 (aged 85); Moscow, Russia
- Citizenship: Russian
- Education: Moscow State Institute of International Relations
- Known for: Member of the Russian Academy of Sciences and the Union of Russian Artists
- Spouse: Valentina Olegovna Gromyko
- Children: Igor, Alexei, Anna
- Parents: Andrei Gromyko (father); Lydia Gromyko (mother)
- Awards: Order of the October Revolution
- Scientific career
- Fields: American and African studies
- Institutions: Institute for African Studies and Institute for US and Canadian Studies of the Russian Academy of Sciences

Anatoly Andreyevich Gromyko (Russian: Анатолий Андреевич Громыко; 15 April 1932 – 25 September 2017) was a Soviet and Russian scientist and diplomat. He specialized in American and African studies as well as international relations, and was a member of the Russian Academy of Sciences and the Union of Russian Artists.

== Biography ==
Gromyko was born in Barysaw, in the Byelorussian SSR of the Soviet Union, in 1932, and between 1939 and 1948 lived in the United States, where his father Andrei Gromyko worked as the Soviet ambassador and representative in the United Nations. In 1954, he graduated from the Moscow State Institute of International Relations, and between 1961 and 1965 worked at the Soviet Embassy to the United Kingdom. After that he took leading positions at the Institute for African Studies and Institute for US and Canadian Studies of the Russian Academy of Sciences. He then returned to diplomacy and acted as the Soviet deputy ambassador in the United States (1973–1974) and East Germany (1974–1975). Between 1976 and 1991, he headed the Institute for African Studies, where he continued working until 2010. From 2010 on, he lectured at the Institute of International Security and at the Moscow State University. In 1981, he was elected to the Russian Academy of Sciences where he curated African studies.

Gromyko co-authored more than 30 books and more than 300 journal articles. He was awarded the Order of the October Revolution, Order of Friendship of Peoples and USSR State Prize (1980).

== Personal life ==
Gromyko was married twice, the second time to Valentina Olegovna Gromyko. He had two sons from different marriages, Igor (born 1954) and Aleksei (born 1969), as well as a daughter, Anna. Igor is a diplomat, whereas Alexei is a political scientist.
