= Berlin Crisis of 1958–1959 =

Cold War crisis in divided Berlin

The Berlin Crisis of 1958–1959 was a crisis over the status of West Berlin during the Cold War. It resulted from efforts by Soviet leader Nikita Khrushchev to react strongly against American nuclear warheads located in West Germany, and build up the prestige of the Soviet satellite state of East Germany. American President Dwight D. Eisenhower mobilized NATO opposition. He was strongly supported by German Chancellor Konrad Adenauer, but the United Kingdom went along reluctantly. There was never any military action. The result was a continuation of the status quo in Berlin, and a move by Eisenhower and Khrushchev toward détente. The Berlin problem had not disappeared, and escalated into a major conflict over building the Berlin Wall in 1961.

== Background ==
=== Emigration through East Berlin ===
Between 1945 and 1950, over 1.5 million people emigrated from Soviet-occupied Eastern European countries to the West. Entry into West Germany from the East was relatively easy, as it eased the still recovering East German economy. The number of Eastern Europeans (mostly Germans) applying for political asylum in West Germany was 197,000 in 1950, 165,000 in 1951, 182,000 in 1952 and 331,000 in 1953. The exodus was especially high among intellectuals, engineers and highly skilled workers. The drain became intolerable for the Kremlin, which in the early 1950s imposed the system of emigration restriction on their satellites. In 1953 the Inner German border between the two German states was closed. In 1955, the Kremlin transferred control over civilian access in Berlin to East Germany, officially abdicating direct responsibility of matters therein, thus passing control to a government not recognized by the Western powers that held sovereignty in West Berlin, the United States, Britain, and France. There were still far too many visitors who never returned, so the East German government stopped all travel between the west and east in 1956.

Despite the official closing of the Inner German border in 1952, the border in Berlin remained considerably more accessible than the rest of the border because it was administered by all four occupying powers. Accordingly, Berlin became the main route by which East Germans left for the West. The Berlin sector border was essentially a "loophole" through which Eastern Bloc citizens could still escape. The millions of East Germans who had escaped by 1961 totalled a fifth of the entire East German population. The loss was disproportionately heavy among professionals—engineers, technicians, physicians, teachers, lawyers and skilled workers. The "brain drain" of professionals had become so damaging to the political credibility and economic viability of East Germany that closing this loophole and securing the Soviet-imposed east–west-Berlin frontier was imperative.

=== West German rearmament ===
1955 saw the United States welcome West Germany into its alliance, NATO. United States leadership thought that German reunification was important to secure, and they thought rearming West Germany could give them the leverage needed to achieve that goal. The United States and West Germany were alone in this goal however, as the United Kingdom and France did not support the reunification by this time. The United States also wanted Germany to stay aligned with the Western powers, even if it should just be Western Germany in that case. The United States and other Western powers first agreed to let West Germany conventionally rearm, but West German leadership would complain about "discrimination" when denied nuclear weapons as part of the rearmament. West Germany would demand tactical nuclear weapons or a general disarmament throughout much of 1956 and 1957. Eisenhower proposed in 1957 that West Germany would get nuclear capable launchers, and the United States would have control over the warheads themselves. In 1958 Konrad Adenauer, the leader of West Germany, would begin work to try to arm West Germany with its own nuclear weapons in 1958.

Preventing West Germany from joining NATO had been an important goal for Soviet leadership, and their failure to do so forced a change in strategy. They made an alliance with the Eastern Bloc countries, the Warsaw Pact, and engaged in extended diplomacy with Adenauer. West Germany possibly getting nuclear weapons of its own, and uncertainty in the future of West German politics, led Soviet leaders to move away from supporting reunification. Khrushchev instead moved towards a two states solution, recognizing West Germany and giving East Germany more autonomy. He had hoped to gain more direct influence over West Germany, while being able to maintain assistance sent into Eastern Germany.

== 1958 Berlin ultimatum ==
Soviet Premier Nikita Khrushchev finally achieved full power as Communist Party leader and Premier in the Kremlin in early 1958. Bolstered by the worldwide success of the Sputnik project, he was overconfident in Soviet military superiority. Annoyed by the U.S. locating nuclear missiles at American bases in West Germany, he sought bargaining leverage to reverse that threat. Despite critics voicing concerns about his tendency towards recklessness, he decided to announce decisive actions to resolve the German situation.

Khrushchev sought to find a lasting solution to the problem of a divided Germany and of the enclave of West Berlin deep within East German territory. In November 1958, calling West Berlin a "malignant tumor", he gave the United States, United Kingdom and France six months to conclude a peace treaty with both German states and the Soviet Union. If one was not signed, Khrushchev stated, the Soviet Union would conclude a peace treaty with East Germany. This would leave East Germany, which was not a party to treaties giving the Western Powers access to Berlin, in control of the routes to the city. This ultimatum caused dissent among the Western Allies, who were reluctant to go to war over the issue. Khrushchev, however, repeatedly extended the deadline. He had hoped to strengthen East Germany with the ultimatums. Khrushchev thought if he could get West Berlin made into a free city, and if the Western Powers would recognize East Germany, that he could curb the East German emigration crisis.

In November 1958, Khrushchev issued the Western powers an ultimatum to withdraw from Berlin within six months and make it a free, demilitarized city. Khrushchev declared that, at the end of that period, the Soviet Union would turn over control of all lines of communication with West Berlin to East Germany, meaning the western powers would have access to West Berlin only when East Germany permitted it. In response, the United States, United Kingdom, and France clearly expressed their strong determination to remain in, and maintain their legal right of free access to, West Berlin.

With tensions mounting, the United States, United Kingdom and France formed a covert group with orders to plan for an eventual response to any aggression on West Berlin. The planning group was named LIVE OAK, and staff from the three countries prepared land and air plans to guarantee access to and from West Berlin.

From the NATO perspective West Berlin—deep in Communist territory—had no military value. However it was the preeminent symbol of resistance to Soviet takeover of Europe. Eisenhower commented that Berlin was an "instance in which our political posture requires us to assume military postures that are wholly illogical.” British Prime Minister Harold Macmillan visited Moscow for extended discussions with Khrushchev in February 1959. The meetings were mostly cordial; the ultimatum was dropped. The Western Powers did not agree much on what they should do about the ultimatums. The French took a tougher stance, ready to call the bluff of the Soviet Union. Eisenhower initially took a similar hard line position, but soon realized that negotiations could be made without seeming weak. The UK took a weaker position, even after the February meetings, which Macmillan himself was embarrassed by, they still wanted to negotiate to maintain the status quo. The West German position was against any talks that involved East Germany, and that reunification could only be gained by free elections.

=== Negotiations ===
The Soviet Union withdrew its deadline in May 1959, and the foreign ministers of the four countries spent three months meeting. They did not come to any major agreements, but this process led to negotiations and to Khrushchev's September 1959 visit to the United States, at the end of which he and Eisenhower jointly asserted that general disarmament was of utmost importance and that such issues as that of Berlin "should be settled, not by the application of force, but by peaceful means through negotiations."

Eisenhower and Khrushchev met at the US presidential retreat Camp David, where they talked frankly with each other. "There was nothing more inadvisable in this situation," said Eisenhower, "than to talk about ultimatums, since both sides knew very well what would happen if an ultimatum were to be implemented." Khrushchev responded that he did not understand how a peace treaty could be regarded by the American people as a "threat to peace". Eisenhower admitted that the situation in Berlin was "abnormal" and that "human affairs got very badly tangled at times." Khrushchev came away with the impression that a deal was possible over Berlin, and they agreed to continue the dialogue at a summit in Paris in May 1960. However, the Paris Summit that was to resolve the Berlin question was cancelled in the fallout from Gary Powers's failed U-2 spy flight on 1 May 1960.

== See also ==
- Escape attempts and victims of the inner German border
- Flight and expulsion of Germans (1944–1950)
  - Republikflucht, flight from East Germany
- History of Berlin
- Nikita Khrushchev
- Presidency of Dwight D. Eisenhower
- Rapacki Plan, Polish proposal for nuclear free zone in central Europe; never adopted
