= Andrei Gromyko =

Soviet diplomat (1909–1989)

- Андрей Громыко
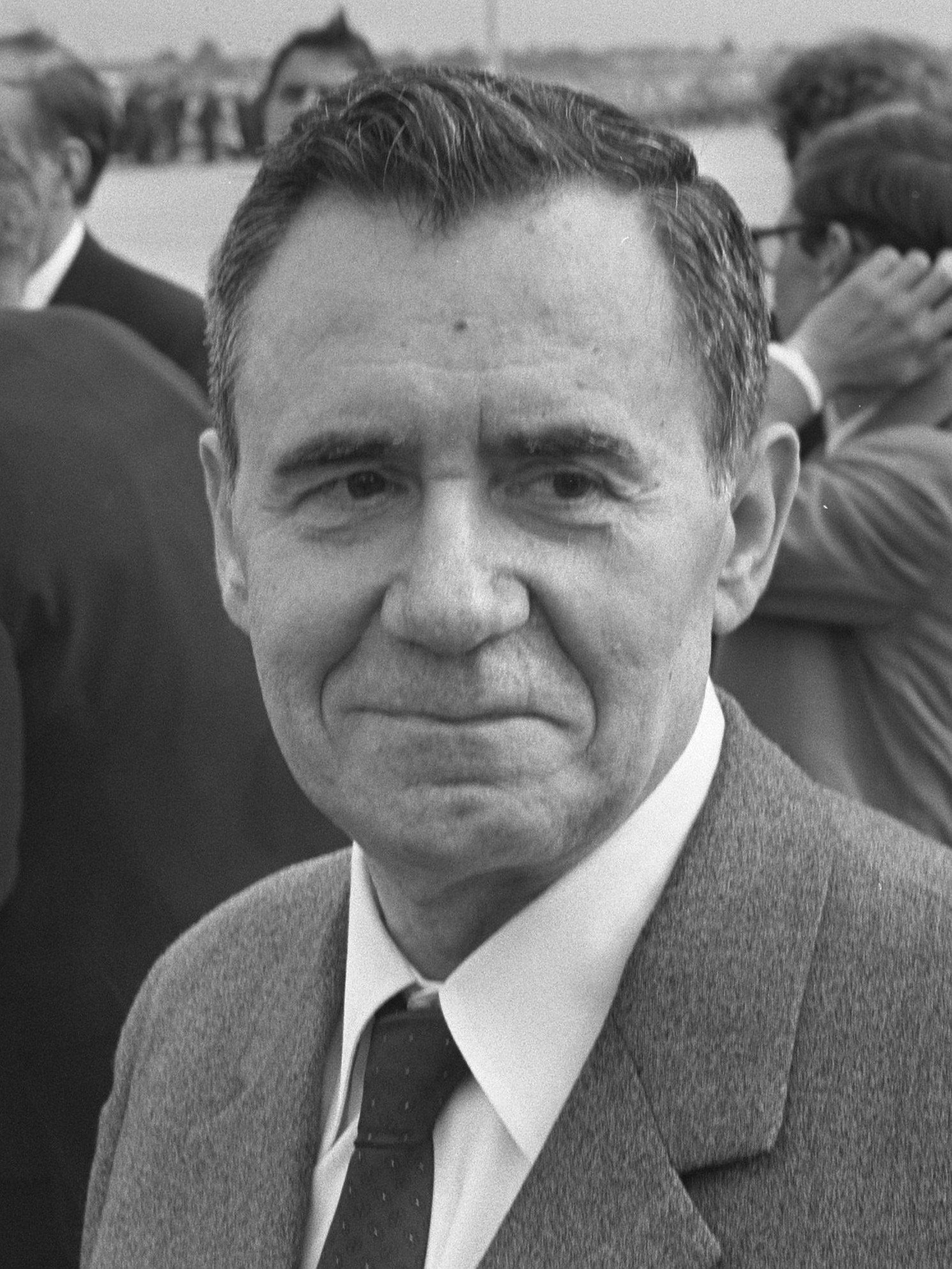
- Gromyko in 1972

Chairman of the Presidium of the Supreme Soviet of the Soviet Union
- In office 27 July 1985 – 1 October 1988
- Premier: Nikolai Tikhonov; Nikolai Ryzhkov
- Deputy: Vasily Kuznetsov; Pyotr Demichev
- Preceded by: Vasily Kuznetsov (acting)
- Succeeded by: Mikhail Gorbachev

First Deputy Chairman of the Council of Ministers of the Soviet Union
- In office 24 March 1983 – 2 July 1985 Serving with Ivan Arkhipov and Heydar Aliyev
- Premier: Nikolai Tikhonov

Full member of the 24th, 25th, 26th, 27th Politburo of the Communist Party of the Soviet Union
- In office 27 April 1973 – 30 September 1988

Minister of Foreign Affairs
- In office 15 February 1957 – 2 July 1985
- Premier: Nikolai Bulganin; Nikita Khrushchev; Alexei Kosygin; Nikolai Tikhonov
- Preceded by: Dmitri Shepilov
- Succeeded by: Eduard Shevardnadze

Permanent Representative of the Soviet Union to the United Nations
- In office April 1946 – May 1948
- Premier: Joseph Stalin
- Preceded by: Position established
- Succeeded by: Yakov Malik

Personal details
- Born: 5 July 1909 Staryye Gromyki, Russian Empire
- Died: 2 July 1989 (aged 79) Moscow, Soviet Union
- Resting place: Novodevichy Cemetery
- Party: Communist Party of the Soviet Union (1931–1989)
- Spouse: Lydia Grinevich (m. 1931)
- Children: 2, including Anatoly
- Profession: Economist; diplomat; civil servant
- Nickname(s): "Mr. Nyet", "Mr. No", "Grim Grom"

Andrei Andreyevich Gromyko (Note: Russian: Андрей Андреевич Громыко; Belarusian: Андрэй Андрэевіч Грамыка.) (18 July [O.S. 5 July] 1909 – 2 July 1989) was a Soviet politician and diplomat during the Cold War. He served as Minister of Foreign Affairs (1957–1985) and as Chairman of the Presidium of the Supreme Soviet (1985–1988). Gromyko was responsible for many top decisions on Soviet foreign policy until he retired in 1988. In the 1940s, Western pundits called him Mr. Nyet ("Mr. No"), or Grim Grom, because of his frequent use of the Soviet veto in the United Nations Security Council.

Gromyko's political career started in 1939 in the People's Commissariat for Foreign Affairs (renamed Ministry of Foreign Affairs in 1946). He became the Soviet ambassador to the United States in 1943, leaving that position in 1946 to become the Soviet Permanent Representative to the United Nations in New York. Upon his return to Moscow he became a Deputy Minister of Foreign Affairs and later First Deputy Minister of Foreign Affairs and eventually Foreign Minister. He went on to become the Soviet ambassador to the United Kingdom in 1952.

As Foreign Minister of the Soviet Union, Gromyko was directly involved in deliberations with the Americans during the Cuban Missile Crisis and helped broker a peace treaty ending the 1965 Indo-Pakistani War. Under the leadership of Leonid Brezhnev, he played a central role in the establishment of détente with the United States by negotiating the ABM Treaty, the Partial Nuclear Test Ban Treaty and the SALT I & II, among others. As Brezhnev's health deteriorated from the mid-1970s onward, Gromyko began to increasingly dictate Soviet policy alongside Defense Minister Dmitry Ustinov and KGB Chairman Yuri Andropov. Even after Brezhnev's death in 1982, Gromyko's rigid conservatism and distrust of the West continued to underlie the Soviet Union's foreign policy until Mikhail Gorbachev's rise to power in 1985.

Upon Konstantin Chernenko's selection as General Secretary on 13 February 1984, Andrei Gromyko formed an unofficial triumvirate along with Ustinov and Chernenko that governed the Soviet Union through the end of the year. However, following Gorbachev's election as General Secretary in March 1985, Gromyko was removed from office as foreign minister and appointed to the largely ceremonial post of Chairman of the Presidium of the Supreme Soviet of the USSR. He ultimately retired from political life in 1988, and died the following year in Moscow.

== Early life ==
=== Background and youth ===
Gromyko was born to a poor "semi-peasant, semi-worker" Belarusian family in the Belarusian village of Staryye Gromyki, near Gomel, on 18 July 1909. Gromyko's father, Andrei Matveyevich, worked as a seasonal worker in a local factory. Andrei Matveyevich was not a very educated man, having only attended four years of school, but knew how to read and write. He had fought in the Russo-Japanese War of 1904–1905. Gromyko's mother, Olga Yevgenyevna, came from a poor peasant family in the neighbouring city of Zhelezniki. She attended school only for a short period of time as, when her father died, she left to help her mother with the harvest.

Gromyko grew up near the district town of Vetka where most of the inhabitants were devoted Old Believers in the Russian Orthodox Church. Gromyko's own village was also predominantly religious, but Gromyko started doubting the supernatural at a very early age. His first dialog on the subject was with his grandmother Marfa, who answered his inquiry about God with "Wait until you get older. Then you will understand all this much better". According to Gromyko, "Other adults said basically the same thing" when talking about religion. Gromyko's neighbor at the time, Mikhail Sjeljutov, was a freethinker and introduced Gromyko to new non-religious ideas and told Gromyko that scientists were beginning to doubt the existence of God. From the age of nine, after the Bolshevik revolution, Gromyko started reading atheist propaganda in flyers and pamphlets. At the age of thirteen (13), Gromyko became a member of the Komsomol and held anti-religious speeches in the village with his friends as well as promoting Communist values.

The news that Germany had attacked the Russian Empire in August 1914 came without warning to the local population. This was the first time, as Gromyko notes, that he felt "love for his country". His father, Andrei Matveyevich, was again conscripted into the Imperial Russian Army and served for three years on the southwestern front, under the leadership of General Aleksei Brusilov. Andrei Matveyevich returned home on the eve of the 1917 October Revolution in Russia.

Gromyko was elected First Secretary of the local Komsomol chapter at the beginning of 1923. Following Vladimir Lenin's death in 1924, the villagers asked Gromyko what would happen in the leader's absence. Gromyko remembered a communist slogan from the heyday of the October Revolution: "The revolution was carried through by Lenin and his helpers." He then told the villagers that Lenin was dead, but "his aides, the Party, still lived on."

=== Education and party membership ===
When he was young, Gromyko's mother Olga told him that he should leave his home town to become an educated man. Gromyko followed his mother's advice and, after finishing seven years of primary school and vocational education in Gomel, he moved to Borisov to attend technical school. Gromyko became a member of the All-Union Communist Party Bolsheviks in 1931, something he had dreamed of since he learned about the "difference between a poor farmer and a landowner, a worker and a capitalist". Gromyko was voted in as secretary of his party cell at his first party conference and used most of his weekends doing volunteer work. Gromyko received a very small stipend to live on, but still had a strong nostalgia for the days when he worked as a volunteer. It was about this time that Gromyko met his future wife, Lydia Grinevich. Grinevich was the daughter of a Belarusian peasant family and came from Kamenki, a small village to the west of Minsk. She and Gromyko had two children, Anatoly and Emiliya.

After studying in Borisov for two years, Gromyko was appointed principal of a secondary school in Dzyarzhynsk, where he taught, supervised the school, and continued his studies. One day, a representative from the Central Committee of the Communist Party of Byelorussia offered him an opportunity to do post-graduate work in Minsk. Gromyko traveled to Minsk for an interview with the head of the university, I.M. Borisevich, who explained that a new post-graduate program had been formed for training in economics; Gromyko's record in education and social work made him a desirable candidate. Gromyko advised Borisevich that he would have difficulty living on a meager student stipend. Borisevich assured him that on finishing the program, his salary would be at the party's top pay grade – "a decent living wage". Gromyko accepted the offer, moving his family to Minsk in 1933. Gromyko and the other post-graduates were invited to an anniversary reception at which, as recounted in Gromyko's Memoirs:

We were amazed to find ourselves treated as equals and placed at their table to enjoy what for us was a sumptuous feast. We realised then that not for nothing did the Soviet state treat its scientists well: evidently science and those who worked in it were highly regarded by the state.

After that day of pleasantry, Gromyko for the first time in his life wanted to enter higher education, but without warning, Gromyko and his family were moved in 1934 to Moscow, settling in the northeastern Alexeyevsky District. In 1936, after another three years of studying economics, Gromyko became a researcher and lecturer at the Soviet Academy of Sciences. His area of expertise was the US economy, and he published several books on the subject. Gromyko assumed his new job would be a permanent one, but in 1939 he was called upon by a Central Committee Commission which selected new personnel to work in diplomacy. (The Great Purge of 1938 opened many positions in the diplomatic corps.) Gromyko recognised such familiar faces as Vyacheslav Molotov and Georgy Malenkov. A couple of days later he was transferred from the Academy of Sciences to the diplomatic service.

=== Ambassador and World War II ===
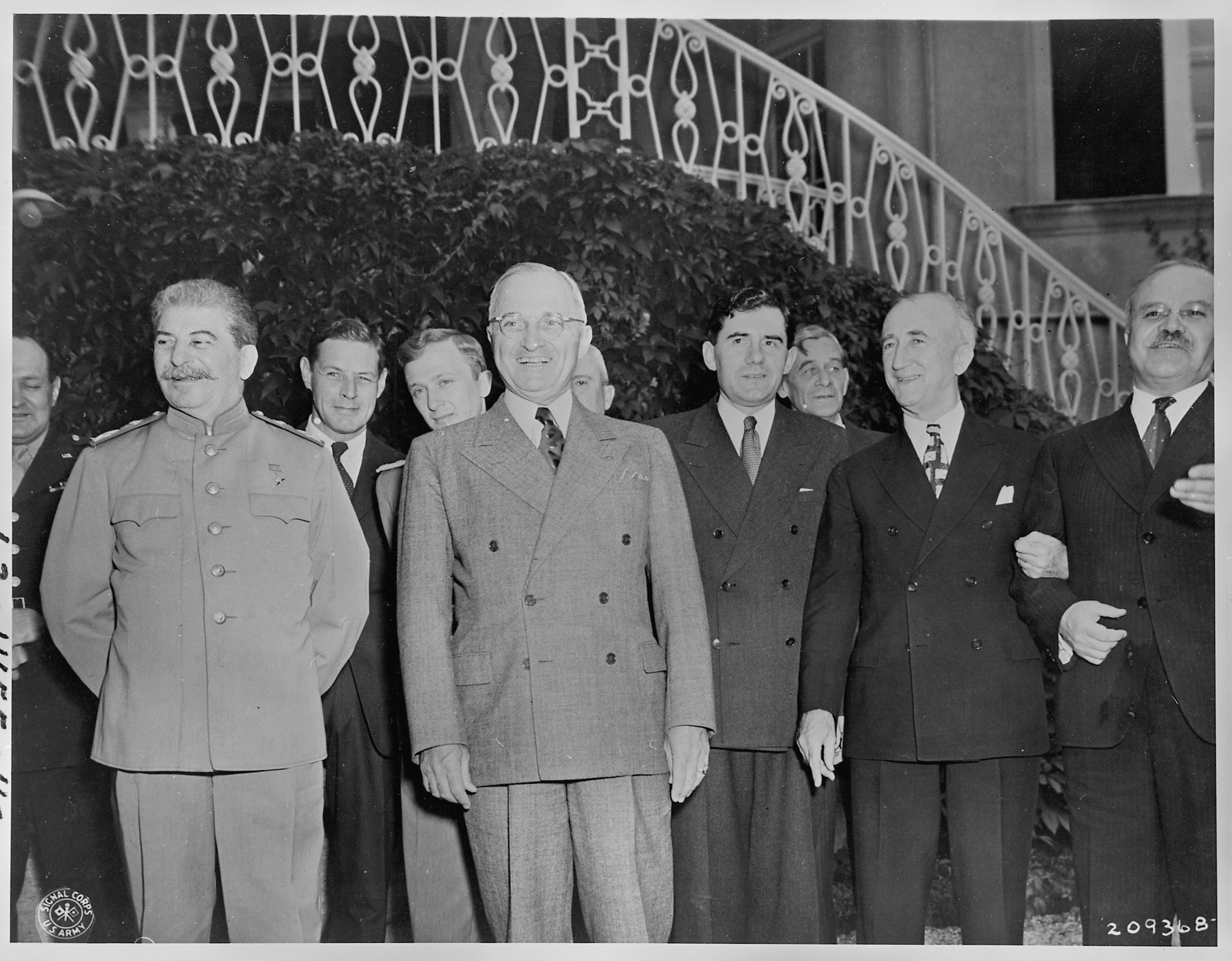
Gromyko standing between Harry Truman and James Byrnes at the Potsdam Conference in July 1945

In early 1939, Gromyko started working for the People's Commissariat for Foreign Affairs in Moscow. He became the Head of the Department of Americas, and because of his position Gromyko met with United States ambassador to the Soviet Union Lawrence Steinhardt. Gromyko believed Steinhardt to be "totally uninterested in creating good relations between the US and the USSR" and that Steinhardt's predecessor Joseph Davies was more "colourful" and seemed "genuinely interested" in improving the relations between the two countries. Davies received the Order of Lenin for his work in trying to improve diplomatic relations between the US and the USSR. After heading the Americas department for 6 months, Gromyko was called upon by Joseph Stalin, the Soviet leader. Stalin started the conversation by telling Gromyko that he would be sent to the Soviet embassy in the United States to become second-in-command. "The Soviet Union," Stalin said, "should maintain reasonable relations with such a powerful country like the United States, especially in light of the growing fascist threat". Vyacheslav Molotov contributed with some minor modifications but mostly agreed with what Stalin had said. "How are your English skills improving?," Stalin asked; "Comrade Gromyko, you should pay a visit or two to an American church and listen to their sermons. Priests usually speak correct English with good accents. Do you know that the Russian revolutionaries, when they were abroad, always followed this practice to improve their skills in foreign languages?" Gromyko was quite amazed about what Stalin had just told him but he never visited an American church.

Gromyko had never been abroad before and, to get to the United States, he had to travel via airplane through Romania, Bulgaria and Yugoslavia to Genoa, Italy, where he boarded a ship to the United States. He later wrote in his Memoirs that New York City was a good example of how humans, by the "means of wealth and technology are able to create something that is totally alien to our nature". He further noticed the New York working districts, which in his own opinion, were proof of the inhumanity of capitalism and of the system's greed. Gromyko met and consulted with most of the senior officers of the United States government during his first days and succeeded Maxim Litvinov as ambassador to the United States in 1943. In his Memoirs Gromyko wrote fondly of President Franklin D. Roosevelt even though he believed him to be a representative of the bourgeoisie class. During his time as ambassador, Gromyko met prominent personalities such as British actor Charlie Chaplin, and British economist John Maynard Keynes.

Gromyko was a Soviet delegate to the Tehran, Dumbarton Oaks, Yalta and Potsdam conferences. In 1943, the same year as the Tehran Conference, the USSR established diplomatic relations with Cuba and Gromyko was appointed the Soviet ambassador to Havana. Gromyko claimed that the accusations brought against Roosevelt by American right-wingers, that he was a socialist sympathizer, were absurd. While he started out as a member delegate, Gromyko later became the head of the Soviet delegation to the San Francisco conference after Molotov's departure. When he later returned to Moscow to celebrate the Soviet victory in the Great Patriotic War, Stalin commended him saying a good diplomat was "worth two or three armies at the front".

== At the helm of Soviet foreign policy ==
=== United Nations ===
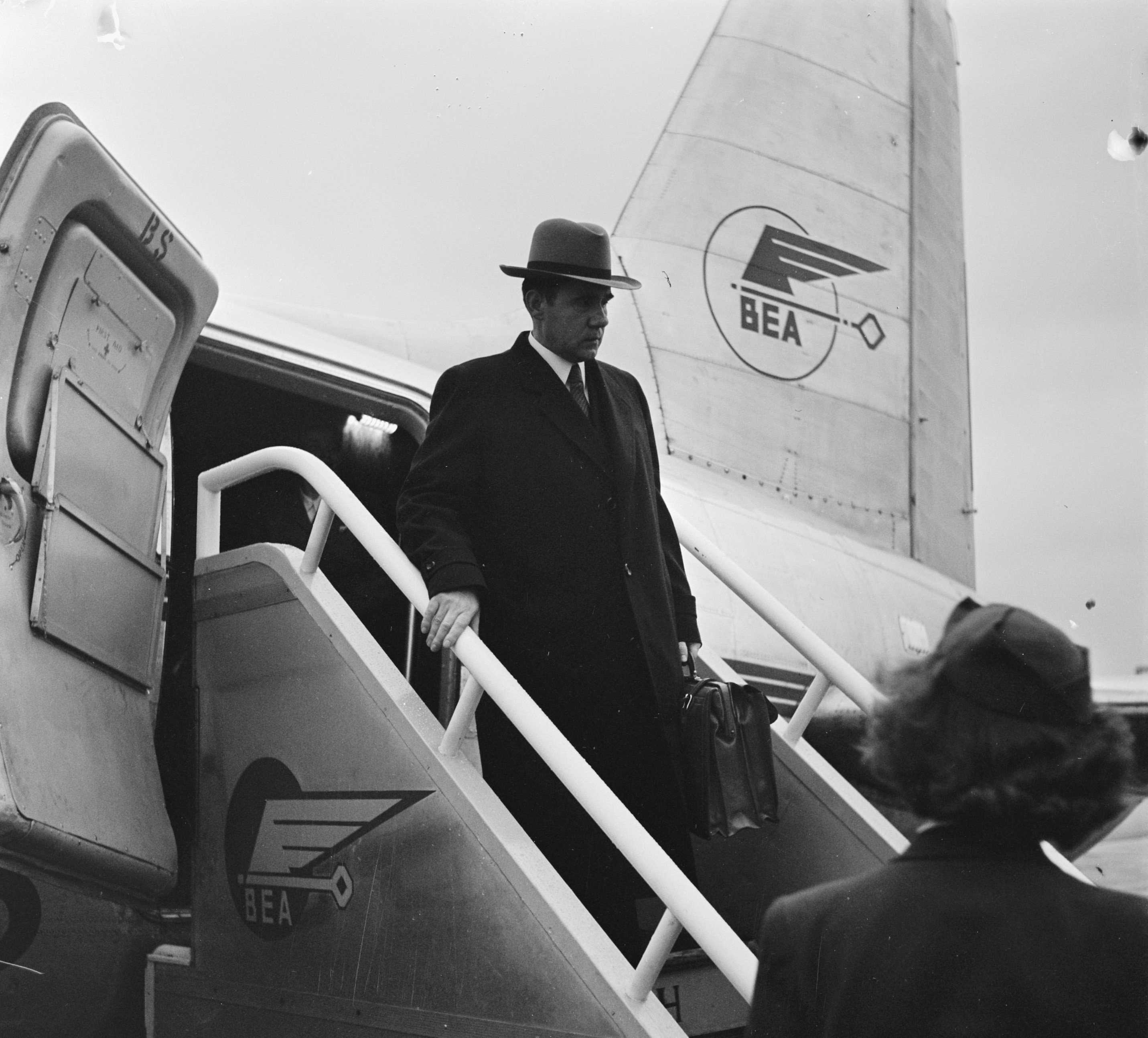
Gromyko in 1952

Gromyko was appointed Permanent Representative of the Soviet Union to the United Nations (UN) in April 1946. The USSR supported the election of the first Secretary-General of the United Nations, Trygve Lie, a former Norwegian Minister of Foreign Affairs. However, in the opinion of Gromyko, Lie became an active supporter of the "expansionist behaviour" of the United States and its "American aggressionist" policy. Because of this political stance, Gromyko believed Lie to be a poor Secretary-General. Trygve's successor, Swede Dag Hammarskjöld, also promoted what Gromyko claimed were "anti-Soviet policies". U Thant, the third Secretary-General, once told Gromyko that it was "close to impossible" to have an "objective opinion of the USSR" in the Secretariat of the United Nations because the majority of Secretariat members were of American nationality or "supporters of the United States".

Gromyko often used the Soviet veto power in the early days of the United Nations. So familiar was a Soviet veto in the early days of the UN that Gromyko became known as Mr. Nyet, literally meaning "Mr. No". During the first 10 years of the UN's history, the Soviet Union used its veto 79 times. In the same period, the Republic of China used the veto once, France twice, and the others not at all. On 14 May 1947, Gromyko advocated the one-state solution to the Israeli–Palestinian conflict, and the two-state solution as the second best option in the case that "relations between the Jewish and Arab populations of Palestine ... proved to be so bad that it would be impossible to reconcile them".

=== Ambassador to the United Kingdom ===
Gromyko was appointed Soviet ambassador to the United Kingdom at a June 1952 meeting with Joseph Stalin in the Kremlin. Stalin paced back and forth as normal, telling Gromyko about the importance of his new office, and saying "The United Kingdom now has the opportunity to play a greater role in international politics. But it is not clear in which direction the British government with their great diplomatic experience will steer their efforts [...] This is why we need people who understand their way of thinking". Gromyko met with Winston Churchill in 1952, not to talk about current politics, but nostalgically, about World War II. Gromyko met Churchill again in 1953 to talk about their experiences during World War II before returning to Russia, when he was appointed the Deputy Minister of Foreign Affairs.

=== Foreign Minister ===
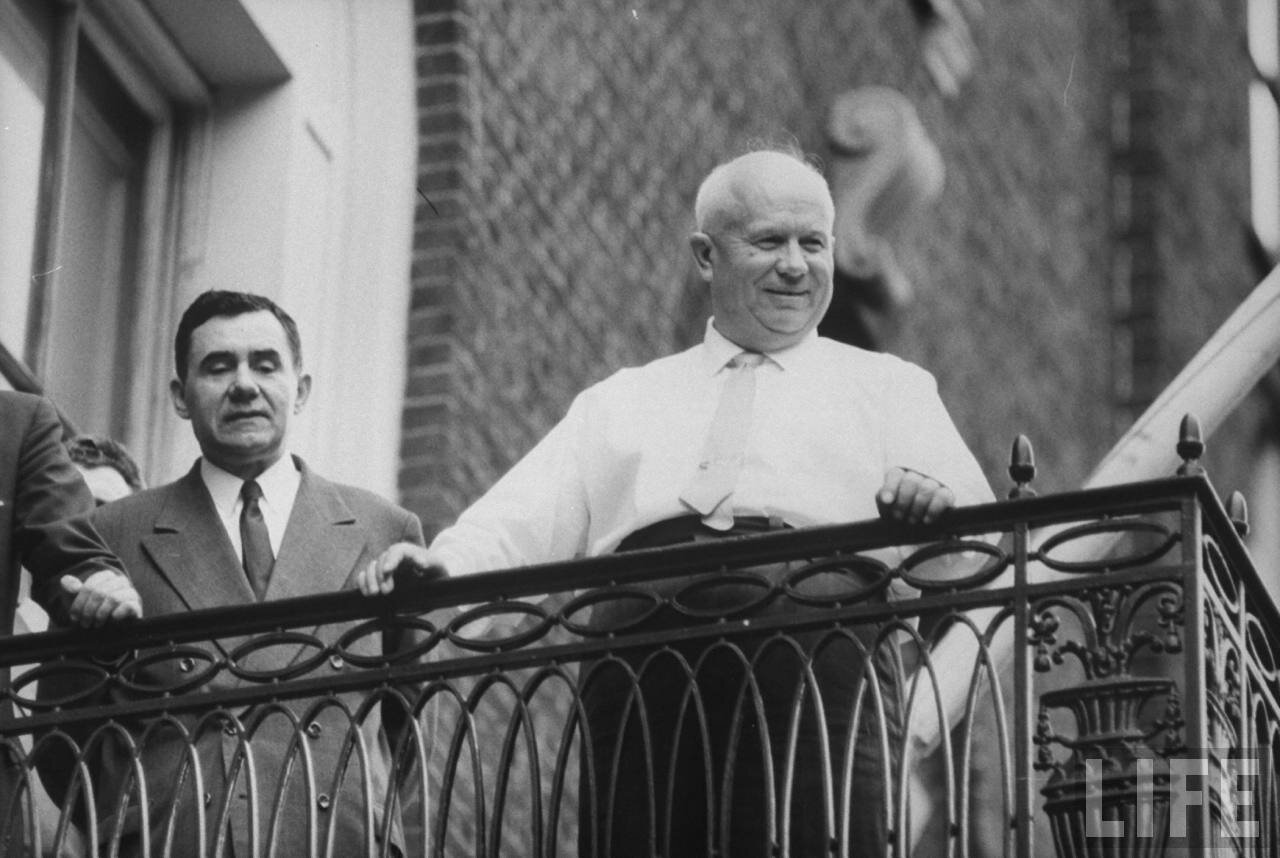
Gromyko with Nikita Khrushchev in 1960

During his initial days as Minister of Foreign Affairs, Andrei Gromyko devoted most of his time battling the International Department (ID) of the Communist Party of the Soviet Union under Boris Ponomarev. Ponomarev advocated an expanded role for the ID in Soviet foreign relations but Gromyko flatly refused. A top Soviet official, Valentin Falin, said the ID "interfered in the activities" of Gromyko and his ministry countless times. Gromyko disliked both Ponomarev and the power sharing between the ID and the foreign ministry. However, even in the midst of such political infighting, Gromyko presided over many key junctures in the Soviet Union's diplomacy throughout his tenure as Foreign Minister.

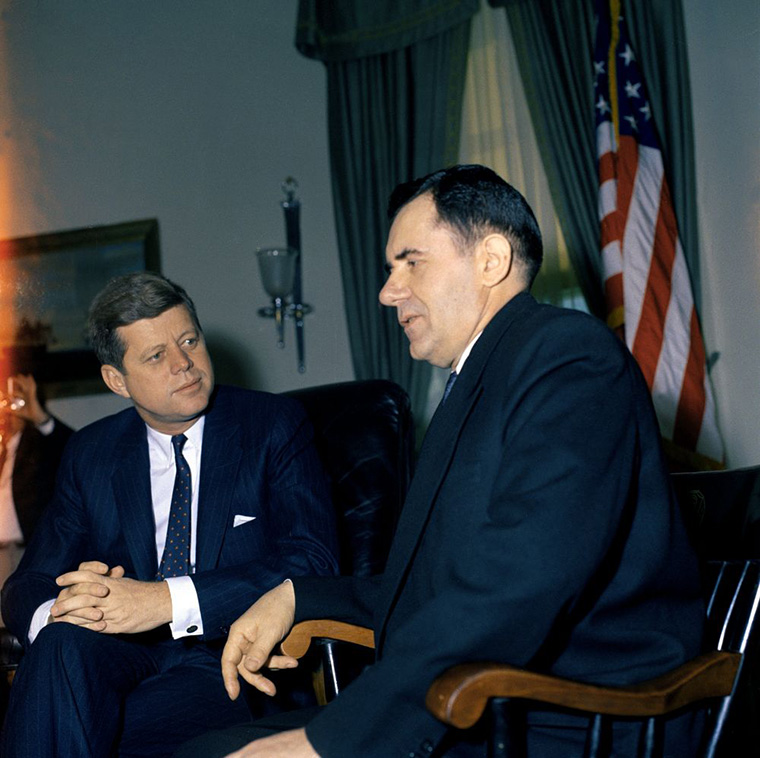
Gromyko and John F. Kennedy in October 1961

One of his first tests as his country's chief diplomat came in 1958 when he addressed Mao Zedong's request for the Soviet Union to back his planned war with Taiwan. During their discussions, Mao flabbergasted Gromyko by telling him that he was willing to sacrifice the lives of "300 million people" to bring about the Republic of China's annexation. Gromyko affirmed to Mao that his proposal would never get the approval of the Soviet leadership. Upon learning of this discussion, Moscow terminated the Soviet-Chinese nuclear program along with various industrialization projects in the People's Republic of China.

Years later during the Cuban Missile Crisis, Gromyko met U.S. President John F. Kennedy while acting under instructions from the current Soviet leader, Nikita Khrushchev. In his Memoirs, Gromyko wrote that Kennedy seemed "out of touch" when he first met him, and was more "ideologically driven" than "practical". In a 1988 interview, he further described Kennedy as nervous and prone to making contradictory statements involving American intentions towards Cuba.

Gromyko, in addition to John F. Kennedy, held important political discussions with Dean Rusk, a former United States Secretary of State, in regards to the Cuban Missile Crisis. He defended his state's actions, stating that the Soviet Union had every right to be present in Cuba, especially considering the fact that the United States had established their own missiles in Turkey. To Gromyko it seemed ironic the Soviet Union was blamed for their presence in Cuba, yet America had established countless foreign military bases worldwide. After several negotiations, Gromyko mentioned: "By Rusk's behavior it was possible to observe how painfully the American leaders are suffering the fact that the Soviet Union decisively has stood on the side of Cuba", showing Rusk's "weak character".

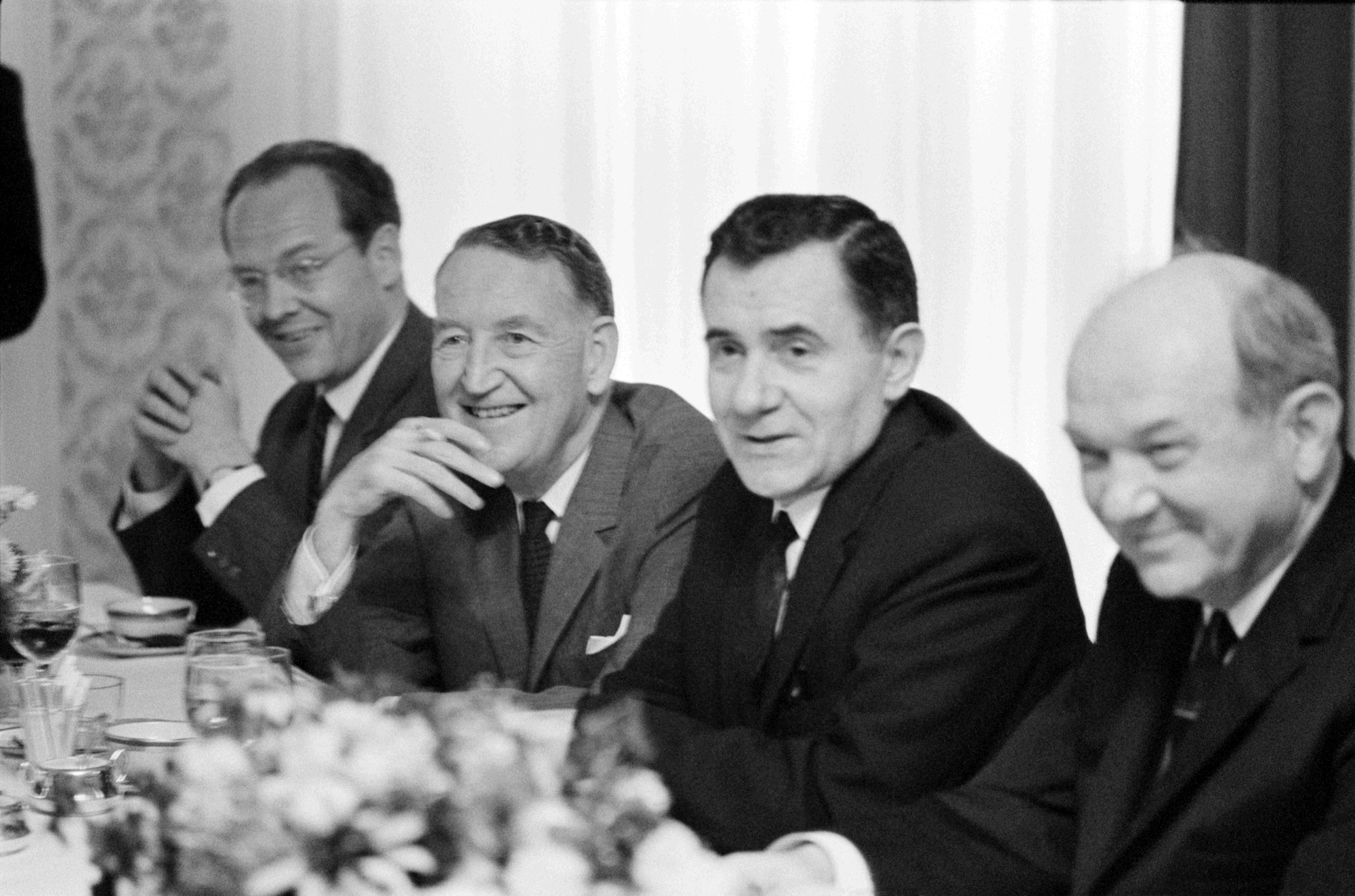
Batsanov, Llewellyn Thompson, Gromyko, and Dean Rusk in 1967 during the Glassboro Summit

Later, under the leadership of Leonid Brezhnev, Gromyko played a key role in the establishment of détente, a new phase of Soviet–American relations characterized by a significant reduction of tensions which lasted until 1979. In furtherance of this new arrangement, he oversaw the signing of the Treaty on the Non-Proliferation of Nuclear Weapons on 1 July 1968, the ABM and SALT I treaties in 1972, and the Agreement on the Prevention of Nuclear War in 1973. During his 28 years as Minister of Foreign Affairs Gromyko supported the policy of disarmament, stating in his Memoirs that "Disarmament is the ideal of Socialism".

Throughout his career, Gromyko explicitly promoted the idea that no important international agreement could be reached without the Soviet Union's involvement. Towards this end, one accomplishment he took particular pride in was the signing of the Partial Nuclear Test Ban Treaty, whose negotiation could be traced back to 1958. Additionally, in 1966, Gromyko and Alexei Kosygin persuaded both Pakistan and India to sign the Tashkent Declaration, a peace treaty in the aftermath of the Indo-Pakistan war of 1965. Later in the same year, he engaged in a dialogue with Pope Paul VI, as part of the pontiff's ostpolitik that resulted in greater openness for the Roman Catholic Church in Eastern Europe, despite heavy persecution of Christians in the Soviet Union itself.

In 1973, Gromyko was promoted to a full voting member of the Politburo, the Soviet Union's highest decision-making body. According to Christian Schmidt-Häuer, the "exceptional memory and confidence in his experience" that served Gromyko well in the past began to make him inflexible, unimaginative and "devoid of a long-term vision" for the USSR upon reaching the peak of his power and influence. By the time Andropov and Chernenko rose to the top of the Soviet leadership, Gromyko frequently found himself advocating a harder line than his superiors.

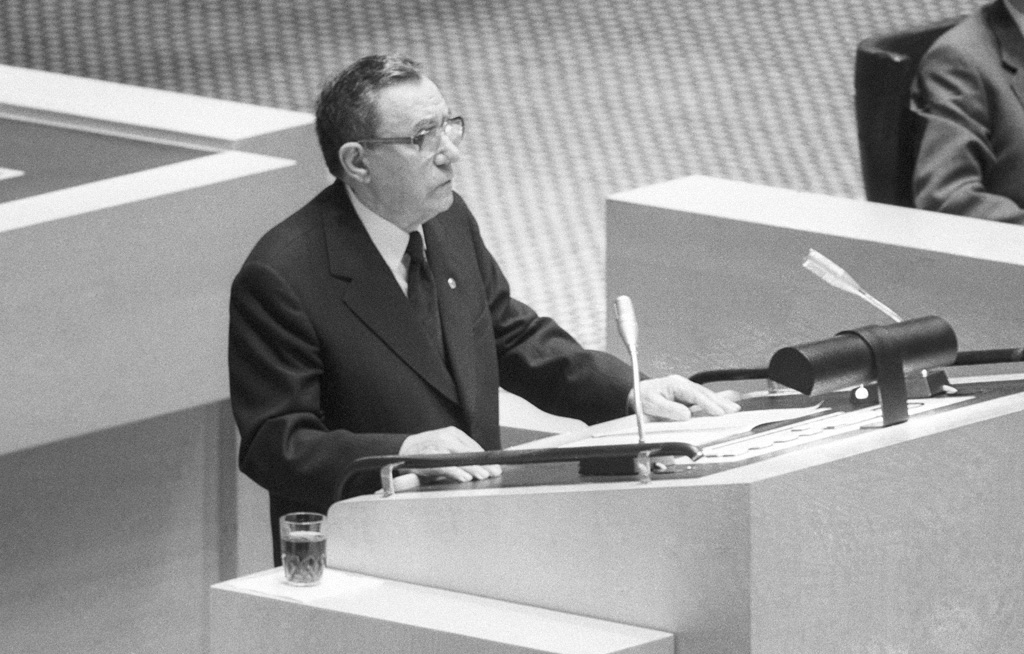
Gromyko at the Stockholm Conference in 1984

As Brezhnev's poor health increasingly impaired his ability to govern from the mid-1970s onward, Gromyko began to dictate Soviet policy alongside KGB Chairman Yuri Andropov and Defense Minister Dmitry Ustinov for the rest of Brezhnev's rule. After Brezhnev's death in 1982, Andropov was voted in as General Secretary by the Politburo. Immediately after his appointment, Andropov asked Gromyko if he wanted to take over Brezhnev's old office of the Chairman of the Presidium of the Supreme Soviet. However, Gromyko turned down Andropov's offer, believing Andropov would eventually take the office for himself.

Ever since being appointed Foreign Minister in February 1957, Gromyko never challenged the authority of those chosen to lead the Soviet Union by the Central Committee. However, this changed when the ailing Konstantin Chernenko rose to become the country's de jure ruler. Unimpressed by the new leader's feeble grasp of foreign relations and weak standing in the Politburo, Gromyko aggressively asserted control over Soviet diplomacy to the point of regularly interrupting and contradicting Chernenko in front of other world leaders. Thus, despite Chernenko's interest in reviving détente, the longtime Foreign Minister's distrust of "the West" meant there was no attempt to return to such a policy.

After Chernenko's death in 1985, Gromyko nominated Mikhail Gorbachev for the General Secretary on 11 March 1985. In supporting Gorbachev, Gromyko knew that the influence he carried would be strong. Upon being elected, Gorbachev relieved Gromyko as foreign minister and replaced him with Eduard Shevardnadze. Subsequently, he was appointed to the largely honorary position of Chairman of the Presidium of the Supreme Soviet.

== Head of state, retirement and death ==
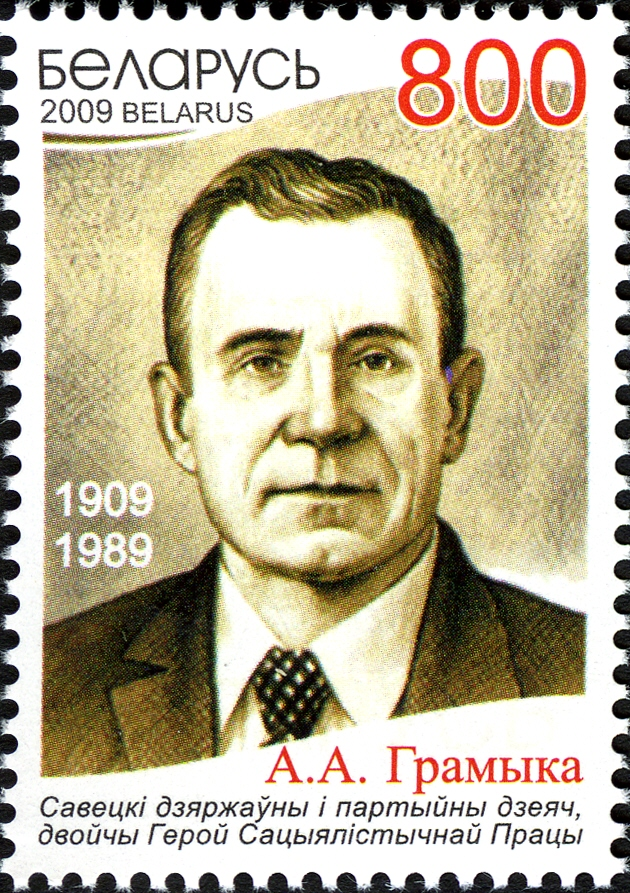
A Belarusian stamp from 2009 depicting Gromyko

Gromyko held the office of the Chairman of the Presidium of the Supreme Soviet; although de jure he was head of state, in practice this was a largely ceremonial role and his influence in ruling circles diminished. A number of First World journalists believed Gromyko was uncomfortable with many of Gorbachev's reforms, however, in his Memoirs Gromyko wrote fondly of Gorbachev and the policy of perestroika. Gromyko believed that perestroika was about working for the construction of a socialist society and saw glasnost and perestroika as an attempt at making the USSR more democratic.

During a party conference in July 1988, Vladimir Melnikov called for Gromyko's resignation. Melnikov blamed Brezhnev for the economic and political stagnation that had hit the Soviet Union, seeing that Gromyko, as a prominent member of the Brezhnev leadership, was one of the men who had led the USSR into the crisis. Gromyko was promptly defended as "a man respected by the people" in a note by an anonymous delegate. After discussing it with his wife, Gromyko decided to leave Soviet politics for good. Gromyko recounts in his Memoirs that before he made it official he told Gorbachev that he wished to resign. The following day, 1 October 1988, Gromyko sat beside Gorbachev, Yegor Ligachev and Nikolai Ryzhkov in the Supreme Soviet to make his resignation official:

Such moments in life are just as memorable as when one is appointed to prominent positions. When my comrades took farewell to me, I was equally moved as I had ever been when I was given an important office. What I thought most about was that I had finished my duties towards the people, the Party and the state. This memory is very precious to me.

Gorbachev succeeded Gromyko in office as Chairman of the Presidium of the Supreme Soviet. After his resignation, Gorbachev praised Gromyko for his half-century of service to USSR. Critics, such as Alexander Belonogov, the Permanent Representative of the Soviet Union to the United Nations, claimed Gromyko's foreign policy was permeated with "a spirit of intolerance and confrontation".

After retiring from active politics in 1989, Gromyko started working on his memoirs. Gromyko died on 2 July 1989, just 16 days before what would have been his 80th birthday, after being hospitalized for a vascular problem that was not further identified. His death was followed by a minute of silence at the Congress of People's Deputies to commemorate him. The Telegraph Agency of the Soviet Union (TASS), the central news organ in the USSR, called him one of the country's most "prominent leaders". The President of the United States, George H. W. Bush, sent his condolences to Gromyko's son, Anatoly. Gromyko was offered a grave in the Kremlin Wall Necropolis, but at the request of his family he was interred in the Novodevichy Cemetery in Moscow.

== Personal life ==
Gromyko met his wife, Lydia (1911–2004) in Minsk where they were both studying agriculture at the Minsk Institute of Agricultural Science. They married in 1931. They had two children: a son, Anatoly, and a daughter, Emilia. Anatoly (1932–2017) served as a diplomat and was an academic.

== Legacy ==
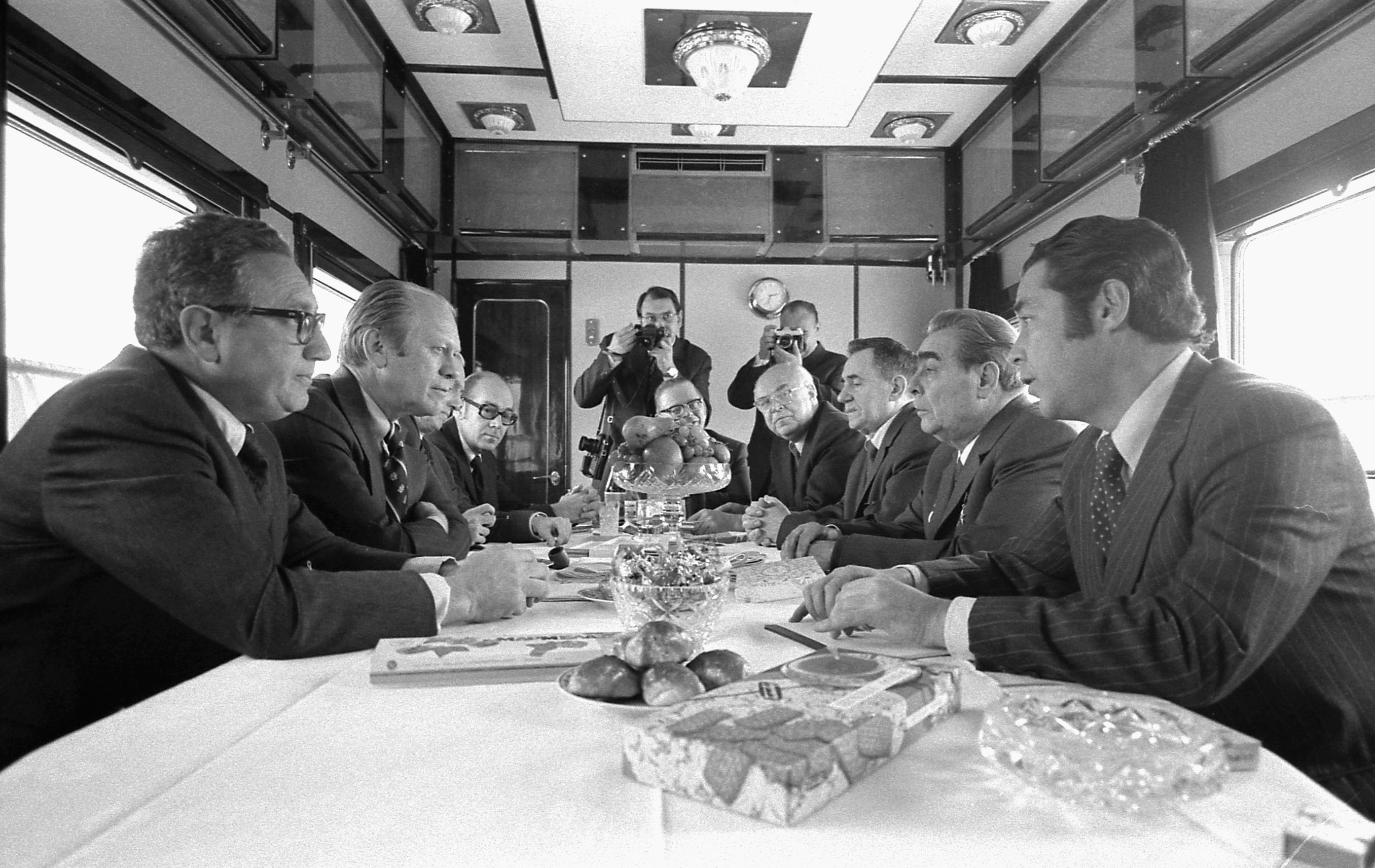
Leonid Brezhnev and Gromyko meeting with Henry Kissinger and President Gerald Ford in Vladivostok, Soviet Union, 1974

Having been a person of considerable stature during his life, Gromyko held an unusual combination of personal characteristics. Some were impressed by his diplomatic skills, while others called Gromyko mundane and boring. An article written in 1981 in The Times said, "He is one of the most active and efficient members of the Soviet leadership. A man with an excellent memory, a keen intellect and extraordinary endurance [...] Maybe Andrey is the most informed Minister for Foreign affairs in the world". Gromyko's dour demeanor was shown clearly during his first term in Washington and echoed throughout his tenure as Soviet foreign minister. Ambassador Charles W. Yost, who worked with Gromyko at the Dumbarton Oaks Conference, the UN founding conference, and at the United Nations, recalled that the "humorless" Soviet ambassador "looked as though he was sucking a lemon." There is a story that Gromyko was leaving a Washington hotel one morning and was asked by a reporter; "Minister Gromyko, did you enjoy your breakfast today?" His response was "Perhaps."

During his twenty-eight years as minister of foreign affairs Gromyko became renowned by his peers for being consumed by his work. Henry Kissinger once said "If you can face Gromyko for one hour and survive, then you can begin to call yourself a diplomat". Gromyko's work influenced Soviet and Russian ambassadors such as Anatoly Dobrynin. Historians Gregory Elliot and Moshe Lewin described Gromyko's main characteristic as his "complete identification with the interest of the state and his faithful service to it", helping to explain his so-called "boring" personality and the mastery of his own ego. West German politician Egon Bahr, when commenting on Gromyko's memoirs, said:

He has concealed a veritable treasure-trove from future generations and taken to the grave with him an inestimable knowledge of international connection between the historical events and major figures of his time, which only he could offer. What a pity that this very man proved incapable to the very end of evoking his experience. As a faithful servant of the state, he believed that he should restrict himself to a sober, concise presentation of the bare essentials.

On 18 July 2009, the Republic Belarus, ruled by Alexander Lukashenko marked the 100th anniversary of Gromyko's birth with nationwide celebrations. In the city of his birth many people laid flowers in front of his bust. A ceremony was held and attended by his son and daughter, Anatoly and Emiliya. Several exhibitions were opened and dedicated to his honour and a school and a street in Gomel were renamed in honour of him.

== Decorations and awards ==
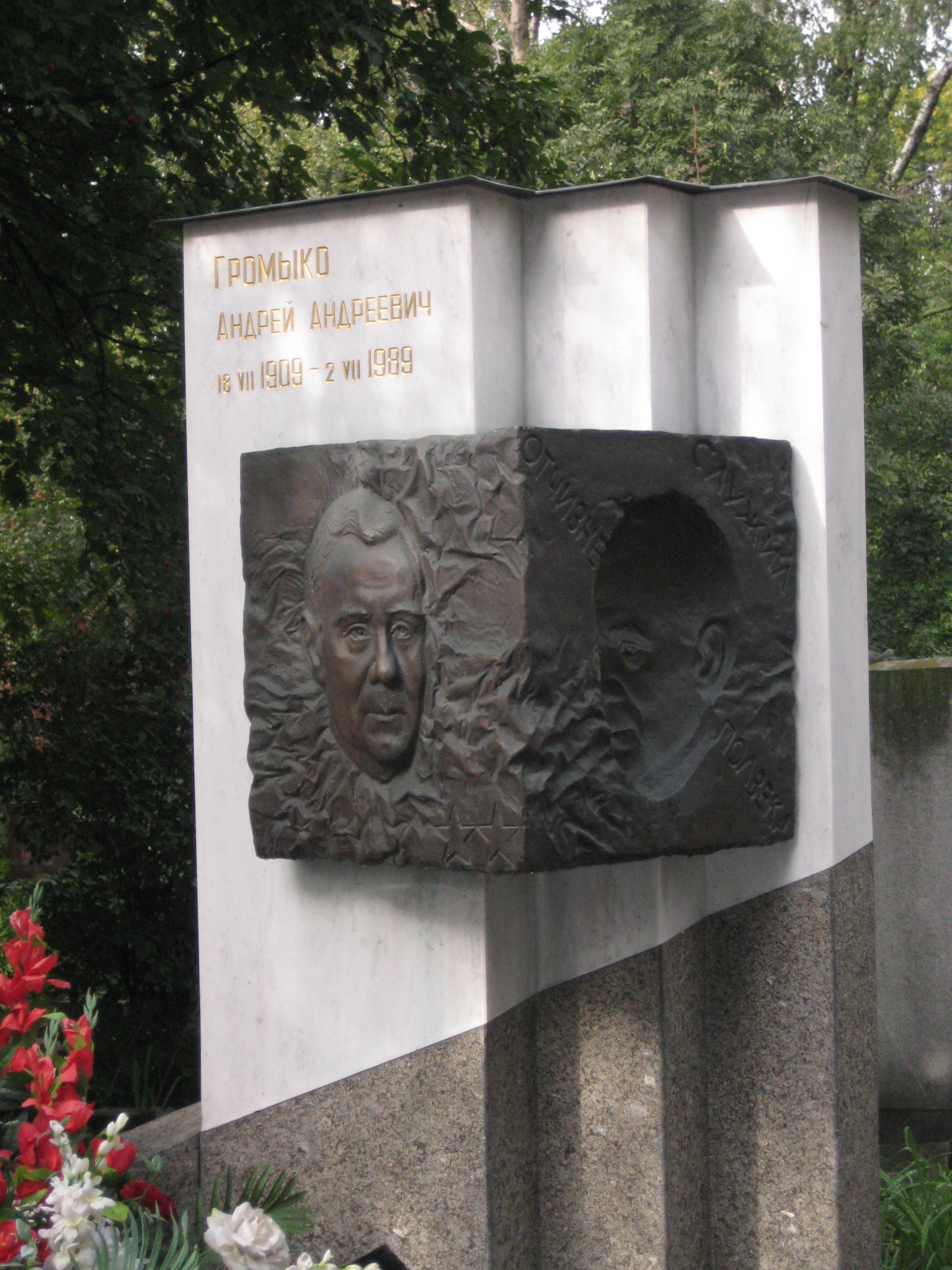
Gromyko's tomb in Moscow

- Soviet Union:
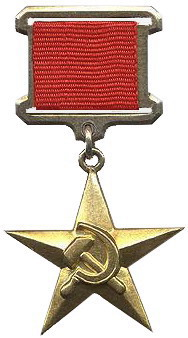
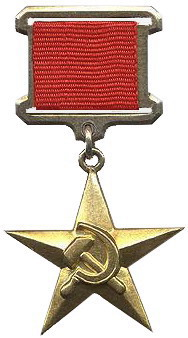
  - Hero of Socialist Labor, twice (1969, 1979)
  - Order of Lenin, seven times (1944, 1945, 1959, 1966, 1969, 1979, 1984)
  - Order of the Patriotic War, 1st class (1985)
  - Order of the Red Banner of Labour (1948)
  - Order of the Badge of Honour (1954)
  - Jubilee Medal "In Commemoration of the 100th Anniversary of the Birth of Vladimir Ilyich Lenin" (1969)
  - Jubilee Medal "Thirty Years of Victory in the Great Patriotic War 1941–1945" (1975)
  - Jubilee Medal "Forty Years of Victory in the Great Patriotic War 1941–1945" (1985)
  - Medal "For Valiant Labour in the Great Patriotic War 1941–1945" (1945)
  - Medal "Veteran of Labour" (1974)
  - Jubilee Medal "70 Years of the Armed Forces of the USSR" (1988)
  - Medal "In Commemoration of the 800th Anniversary of Moscow" (1947)
  - Lenin Prize (1982)
  - USSR State Prize (1984)
- Other countries:
  - Order of the Sun of Freedom (Afghanistan)
  - Order of Georgi Dimitrov (Bulgaria)
  - Order of José Martí (Cuba)
  - Order of Klement Gottwald (Czechoslovakia)
  - Star of Peoples' Friendship (East Germany)
  - Order of the Flag of the Republic of Hungary (Hungary)
  - Order of Peace and Friendship (Hungary)
  - Grand Cross of Order of the Sun of Peru (Peru)
  - Order of Merit of the Polish People's Republic, 1st class (Poland)
