= Brezhnev (surname) =

Brezhnev (masculine, Russian: Брежнев) or Brezhneva (feminine, Russian: Брежнева) is a Russian surname. Notable people with the surname include:

- Galina Brezhneva (1929–1998), Soviet politician, daughter of Leonid and Viktoria
- Leonid Brezhnev (1906–1982), Soviet politician
- Lyubov Brezhneva (born 1943), Soviet writer, niece of Leonid and Viktoria
- Vera Brezhneva (born 1982), Ukrainian actress, singer, and television presenter
- Viktoria Brezhneva (1908–1995), Soviet politician, wife of Leonid
- Vladimir Brezhnev (1935–1996), Russian ice hockey player
- Yuri Brezhnev (1933–2013), Soviet politician, son of Leonid and Viktoria
