= Golubtsov =

Golubtsov (Russian: Голубцов) is a Russian masculine surname, its feminine counterpart is Golubtsova. It may refer to:

- Igor Golubtsov (born 1955), Russian football functionary and coach
- Vadim Golubtsov (born 1988), Russian ice hockey player
- Valeriya Golubtsova (1901–1987), Russian scientist
- Vyacheslav Golubtsov (1894–1972), Soviet and Russian scientist
