= KIO (disambiguation) =

KIO (KDE Input/Output) is a system library incorporated into the KDE architecture.

KIO may also refer to:

- Kiō, a Japanese professional shogi title
- Kio, stage name of a Soviet magician dynasty
  - Emil Kio
  - Emil Kio, Jr.
  - Igor Kio
- Kachin Independence Organisation
- Keep Ireland Open, an organisation that campaigns for open access to the Irish countryside
- An abbreviation of Kibioctet, a unit of information or computer storage
- Kick It Out (organisation), an organisation that aims to keep racism out of football
- Kin On stop (MTR station code: KIO), Hong Kong
- Kuwait Investment Office, the London office of Kuwait Investment Authority
- Sida fallax (Marshallese: kio), a flowering plant in the Hibiscus family

People:

- Shimoku Kio (木尾 士目; born 1974), a Japanese manga artist
- YoungKio, stage name of Dutch record producer Kiowa Roukema
