= Kukharchuk =

Kukharczuk is a Ukrainian surname derived from the occupation kukhar / kucharz, a cook.

Kukharczuk may refer to:

- Ilya Kukharchuk (b. 1990), a Russian football (soccer) player
- Nina Kukharchuk (1900–1984), maiden name of the late wife of a Soviet premier, Nikita Khrushchev
