= Brezhnev (disambiguation) =

Leonid Brezhnev (1906–1982) was a Soviet politician.

Brezhnev may also refer to:

- Brezhnev (surname), including a list of other people with this last name
- Brezhnev (film), a 2005 biographical film about Leonid Brezhnev
- Brezhnev, former name of Naberezhnye Chelny, Russia
