= Wasylów, Gmina Telatyn =

Wasylów
- Village
- Interactive map of Wasylów
- Location within Poland
- Coordinates: 50°32′57″N 23°53′41″E
- Country: Poland
- Voivodeship: Lublin
- County: Tomaszów
- Gmina: Telatyn

Wasylów (Polish: [vaˈsɨluf]) is a village in the administrative district of Gmina Telatyn, within Tomaszów County, Lublin Voivodeship, in eastern Poland.

== Geography ==
Wasylów is located 13 kilometres (8.1 mi) west from the Poland–Ukraine border.

== Notable people ==
- Nina Khrushcheva, wife of Soviet leader Nikita Khrushchev
