= Sergei Khrushchev =

Soviet-American scientist (1935–2020)

- Сергей Хрущёв
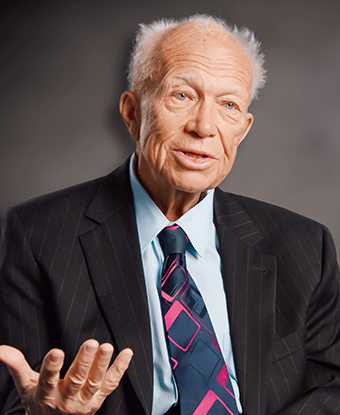
- Khrushchev in 2010
- Born: 2 July 1935; Moscow, Soviet Union
- Died: 18 June 2020 (aged 84); Cranston, Rhode Island, U.S.
- Education: Moscow Power Engineering Institute; Bauman Moscow State Technical University (DSc); National Academy of Sciences of Ukraine (PhD)
- Spouse(s): Galina Mikhailovna; Valentina Golenko
- Children: 3
- Parents: Nikita Khrushchev (father); Nina Petrovna Khrushcheva (mother)

Sergei Nikitich Khrushchev (Russian: Сергей Никитич Хрущёв; 2 July 1935 – 18 June 2020) was a Soviet-born American engineer and the second son of the Cold War-era Soviet Premier Nikita Khrushchev with his wife Nina Petrovna Khrushcheva. He moved to the United States in 1991 and became a naturalized American citizen.

He was a jury member of the Rainer Hildebrandt international human rights award.

== Career ==
Khrushchev held several advanced engineering degrees. From the Bauman Moscow State Technical University he earned his doctoral degree, and he earned a Ph.D. from the National Academy of Sciences of Ukraine. In addition, he earned an M.S. degree with distinction from the Moscow Power Engineering Institute. He also held an "occasional" professorship at the Naval War College in Newport, Rhode Island, meaning he was not a full-time professor (though he was for some time), but did teach there fairly often.

Prior to emigrating from the Soviet Union to the United States in 1991, Khrushchev worked in various high-level engineering positions. From 1968 to 1991, he served at the Control Computer Institute in Moscow, where he rose from section head to first deputy director in charge of research. From the years 1958 to 1968, Khrushchev worked as an engineer, then later as a deputy section head in charge of guidance systems for missile and space design. In this capacity, he worked on cruise missiles for submarine craft, military and research spacecraft, Moon vehicles, and the Proton space booster.

He often spoke to American audiences to share his memories of the "other" side of the Cold War. He told Scientific American that he had tried to see the Apollo 11 Moon landing through a telescope from Ukraine with a KGB officer. Khrushchev served as an advisor to The Cold War Museum. He was a Senior Fellow at the Watson Institute for International and Public Affairs at Brown University.

== Personal life ==
Khrushchev moved to the United States with his wife Valentina from the Soviet Union in 1991, to teach at Brown University in Providence, Rhode Island.

On 12 July 1999, Khrushchev and his wife, Valentina, became citizens of the United States through naturalization. Pronouncing "This is a great country and it's an honor to live here" at the citizenship ceremony. He retained his Russian citizenship, becoming a dual citizen. Khrushchev waited more than the required five years of living in the U.S., fearful his U.S. citizenship would restrict visits to see his extended family. His three sons and three grandchildren still live in Moscow.

His son from a previous marriage, Nikita Sergeyevich Khrushchev, a Russian journalist, died on 22 February 2007, aged 47, from a stroke.

== Death ==
Khrushchev died on 18 June 2020, at his home in Cranston, Rhode Island, at age 84, by suicide. The cause of death, as certified by the Rhode Island medical examiner's office, was a gunshot wound to the head. Cranston, Rhode Island police Major Todd Patalano said there were no signs of foul play, and the investigation by the police into his death was closed with no criminal charges filed.

== Awards ==
- Dr. Rainer Hildebrandt Medal endowed by Alexandra Hildebrandt
- The Medal of the Labor Hero, the Order of Lenin, the Lenin Prize and the Prize of the Soviet Union's Council of Ministers.

== Publications ==
- Sergei Khrushchev, Khrushchev on Khrushchev: An Inside Account of the Man and His Era, by His Son, Sergei Khrushchev, edited and translated by William Taubman, Little, Brown, and Company, 1990, ISBN 0-316-49194-2
- Sergei Khrushchev, Nikita Khrushchev and the Creation of a Superpower, Pennsylvania State University Press, 2000, hardcover: ISBN 0-271-01927-1, softcover: ISBN 0-271-02170-5
- Sergei Khrushchev, Memoirs of Nikita Khrushchev: Reformer, 1945–1964, Pennsylvania State University Press, 2006, hardcover: ISBN 0-271-02861-0
- Sergei Khrushchev, Khrushchev in Power: Unfinished Reforms, 1961–1964. Lynne Rienner Publishers, 2014, hardcover: ISBN 978-1626370326
