= List of spouses of the heads of state of the Soviet Union =

Spouses of the Head of State of the USSR

The spouses of the heads of state carried no official duties and received no salary. Nonetheless, they attended many official ceremonies and functions of state either along with or in place of the head of state.

== List of First Ladies of the USSR ==
| No. | Portrait | Name of spouse | Head of state de facto | |
|---|---|---|---|---|
| 1 | | Nadezhda Krupskaya | Vladimir Lenin | 30 December 1922 – 21 January 1924 |
| 2 | | Nadezhda Alliluyeva | Joseph Stalin | 21 January 1924 – 5 March 1953 |
| 3 | | Valeriya Golubtsova (Note: Domestic partner) | Georgy Malenkov | 5 March 1953 – 7 September 1953 |
| 4 | | Nina Kukharchuk-Khrushcheva (née Kukharchuk) | Nikita Khrushchev | 7 September 1953 – 14 October 1964 |
| 5 | | Viktoria Brezhneva (née Denisova) | Leonid Brezhnev | 14 October 1964 – 10 November 1982 |
| 6 | | Tatyana Andropova (née Lebedeva) | Yuri Andropov | 10 November 1982 – 9 February 1984 |
| 7 | | Anna Chernenko (née Lyubimova) | Konstantin Chernenko | 9 February 1984 – 10 March 1985 |
| 8 | | Raisa Gorbacheva (née Titarenko) | Mikhail Gorbachev | 10 March 1985 – 25 December 1991 |

== List of spouses ==
| No. | Portrait | Name of spouse | Head of state de jure | |
|---|---|---|---|---|
| 1 | | Ekaterina Kalinina (née Lorberg) | Mikhail Kalinin | 30 December 1922 – 19 March 1946 |
| 2 | | Mariya Shvernik (née Ulazovskaya) | Nikolay Shvernik | 19 March 1946 – 6 March 1953 |
| 3 | | Ekaterina Voroshilova (née Gorbman) | Kliment Voroshilov | 15 March 1953 – 7 May 1960 |
| 4 | | Viktoria Brezhneva (née Denisova) | Leonid Brezhnev | 7 May 1960 – 15 July 1964 |
| 5 | | Ashkhen Mikoyan (née Tumanyan) | Anastas Mikoyan | 15 July 1964 – 9 December 1965 |
| 6 | | Natalya Podgornaya (née Nazarova) | Nikolai Podgorny | 9 December 1965 – 16 June 1977 |
| 7 | | Viktoria Brezhneva (née Denisova) | Leonid Brezhnev | 16 June 1977 – 10 November 1982 |
| 8 | | Tatyana Andropova (née Lebedeva) | Yuri Andropov | 16 June 1983 – 9 February 1984 |
| 9 | | Anna Chernenko (née Lyubimova) | Konstantin Chernenko | 11 April 1984 – 10 March 1985 |
| 10 | | Lydia Gromyko (née Grinevich) | Andrei Gromyko | 27 July 1985 – 1 October 1988 |
| 11 | | Raisa Gorbacheva (née Titarenko) | Mikhail Gorbachev | 1 October 1988 – 25 December 1991 |
