= Valeriya Golubtsova =

Wife of Georgy Malenkov (1901–1987)

- Валерия Голубцова

Domestic partner of the Premier of the Soviet Union (Note: Golubtsova and Malenkov lived as husband and wife from 1920 but the marriage was never formally registered.)
- In office 6 March 1953 – 8 February 1955
- Preceded by: Polina Zhemchuzhina (de jure, until 1941); Nadezhda Alliluyeva (de facto, until 1932)
- Succeeded by: Nina Bulganina; Nina Kukharchuk-Khrushcheva (de facto)

Personal details
- Born: 15 May 1901 Nizhny Novgorod, Russia
- Died: 1 October 1987 (aged 86) Moscow, Soviet Union
- Resting place: Kuntsevo Cemetery
- Domestic partner: Georgy Malenkov (1920–1987)
- Children: 3
- Scientific career
- Awards: Order of the Red Banner of Labour; Order of the Red Star
- Fields: Power engineering

Valeriya Alexeyevna Golubtsova (15 May 1901 — 1 October 1987) was a Soviet scientist and the director of the Moscow Power Engineering Institute (MPEI) from 1943 to 1952. A professor who held a PhD in Technical Sciences, she was the longtime domestic partner of Georgy Malenkov.

== Biography ==
Golubtsova was born in Nizhny Novgorod to a teacher in the Cadet Corps, State Councilor Alexei Golubtsov (1852–1924) and Olga Nevzorova, a member of an old noble family. Nevzorova's older sisters were the famous "Nevzorov sisters" (Zinaida, Sophia, and Augustine) — Vladimir Lenin's comrades-in-arms in Marxist Discussion Circles in the 1890s. Zinaida married Gleb Кrzhizhanovky in 1899, who in the 1920s headed the GOELRO Commission.

The Golubtsov family raised five children: Lyudmila, Valeriya, Roman, Vyacheslav (who later became a professor of the Moscow Power Engineering Institute and a corresponding member of the Аcademy of Sciences of the Soviet Union), and Elena.

In 1917, Golubtsova graduated from a gymnasium in Nizhny Novgorod and went on to library courses. After 1920, during the Russian Civil War, she worked as a librarian on the Turkestan Front. In the agit-train of the cavalry brigade she met Commissar Georgy Malenkov. In 1920, she and Malenkov began living together as husband and wife; the union was never officially registered, and she kept her maiden name for the rest of her life. That same year she joined the Communist Party of the Soviet Union.

After moving to Moscow in 1921, Golubtsova got a job at the Organizing Department of the Central Committee and a separate room in the Loskutnaya Hotel on Тverskaya Street— the center of Moscow's Communist bohemia. Malenkov then entered the Bauman Moscow State Technical University and the couple decided to graduate one-by-one. From 1928 to 1930, she worked as a standardizer at the Moscow Metallurgical Plant.

In 1930, at the direction of the party organization, Golubtsova entered the Moscow Power Engineering Institute. As a student, she took the post of Secretary of the Institute Organization of the CPSU. After graduating in 1934, she worked as an engineer at the Dynamo machine-building company until 1936.

In 1936, she enrolled in the graduate school of the Moscow Power Engineering Institute and dropped out in 1938 due the birth of her two sons.

During the Great Patriotic War, from 1941 to 1942, Golubtsova was evacuated with her family to Samara, where she worked as an instructor in the Samara Regional Committee of the CPSU for the aviation and electrical industries. For her work on commissioning the evacuated factories at a rapid pace, general quarters, and start-up of enterprises, and fulfilment of the plan at all costs, Golubtsova was awarded the Order of the Red Banner of Labour.

In 1942, she returned to Moscow. On 3 June 1943, Golubtsova, an assistant at the Department of Cable Engineering, was appointed director of the Moscow Order of Lenin of the V.M. Molotov Power Engineering Institute. She was the director of the university until 4 January 1952.

=== As the director of the MPEI ===
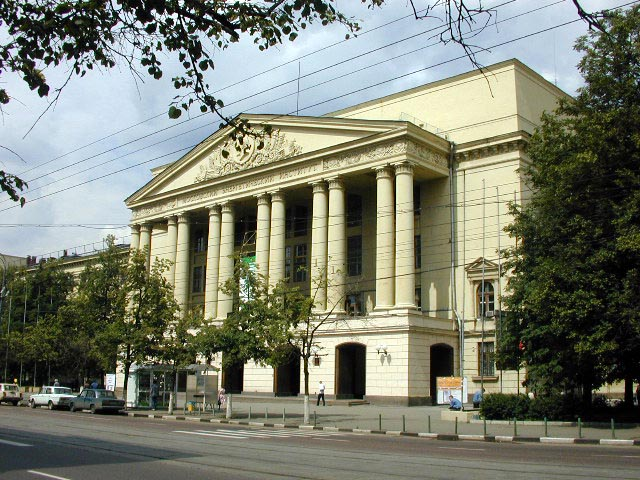
Moscow Power Engineering Institute (MPEI)

Leading the MPEI, Golubtsova knew the institute well. A graduate of the institute, she had also completed its graduate program and was frequently elected to the institution's party bureau. She knew the teaching staff, the party, Komsomol, trade union activists, the traditions, and the material base of the institute. Consequently, she held considerable renown within the inner circles of the country's foremost party and state officials, as well as the leadership of the electric and thermal power industry, among which were MPEI graduates Alexei Pavlenko, Dmitry Zhimerin, and Аnatoly Petrakovsky. In the position of the director of the institute, Golubtsova did a lot to expand the institute and increase its scientific potential. Those who knew her at work noted her ability to see the future and the ability to organize people to solve tasks.

According to Boris Chertok's memoirs about Golubtsova during the Great Patriotic War:

She assumed full responsibility, removed the confused director from the leadership, and organized, as far as possible, a normal evacuation and then the continuation of the educational activities of the institute in a new place. After the war, Golubtsova, as director, showed exceptional activity in the construction of new educational buildings, a pilot plant, the expansion of the laboratory and research base, the construction of a palace of culture, a hostel and residential buildings for professors and teachers. Largely thanks to her energy, combined with her proximity to the highest authorities of the country, a whole town of the Moscow Power Engineering Institute grew up in the area of Krasnokazarmennaya Street. She generously endowed her with organizational talent. The inherent sensitivity found in individuals helped her to unite the efforts of all scientists of the institute with a minimum of contradictions. In any case, the solid MPEI professorship supported the director in all her activities.

The work of Golubtsova as director was highly appreciated by her colleagues. Professor R.G. Romanov stated:

Valeria Alekseyevna's place is among the most prominent MPEI figures.

In my opinion, after the creator of the MPEI, Karl Krug, Valeria Alekseyevna Golubtsova is in second place in terms of importance, in terms of the weight of all her daily work.

Professor A.N. Starostin stated: I saw in her not only a beautiful intelligent woman, a scientist, and a leader, but also a loving mother, for whom the success and happiness of children is the most important thing in life.

Academician Alexander Sheindlin stated:

This woman, to be fair, really did a lot to turn the MPEI into a first-class institution of higher education.

The director of the MPEI at the time of Golubtsova's application for the post, Ilya Teltelbaum, stated: Director of the MPEI V. A. Golubtsova acted exceptionally bravely and decently. After reviewing the documents and the main works of Ilya Markovich and talking with him, in the midst of the "doctors' case" and the fight against "cosmopolitanism", she ordered the head of the MPEI personnel department to take this employee under her personal responsibility.

Golubtsova found an opportunity and took care of the life of students. From the memoirs of students of this time:

Valeria Alekseevna tried to do everything possible to help poor students, and literally dressed the graduate Kalina from head to toe, sending her to the disposal of the Altaienergo department after defending her diploma.

Professor A. L. Zinovev stated:

Valeria Alekseevna constantly found opportunities to provide specific targeted assistance to those in particular need of it. And always "at first there was a word", a kind word...

At the same time, in the memoirs of Raisa Kuznetsova, the wife of the Director of the IIET Ivan Kunetsov, Golubtsova's pronounced antisemitism is clearly noted, in her opinion.

In 1944, the Council of People's Commissars of the USSR issued a resolution on the development of the Moscow Power Engineering Institute, an all-Union training base for power engineers. Valeria Alekseevna took up the implementation of the government's decision with her characteristic energy and perseverance. In a short time, she obtained the necessary funds and materials for the construction of the main building of the MPEI — House Number 17. The construction battalion, with the active participation of students and employees, built buildings "B", "C", "G", "D" of house number 17, row buildings on the territory of a student hostel, all red brick houses on Energeticheskaya Street. Under the conditions of hostilities, such construction was practically impossible, since each builder was counted, but Valeria Alekseevna succeeded. It was she who was able to resolve the issue of transferring two buildings to MPEI: a large 8-story building No. 13, built in 1928–1930 according to the project of a team of domestic authors, and house No. 14, where until 1944 the headquarters of the partisan movement in the Great Patriotic War was located. Later, house number 14 was completed.

In the spring of 1945, Golubtsova, who had the rank of major, visited Vienna, which had just been taken, in order to obtain a test bench and measuring equipment for MPEI, which were located at the Allgemeine Electrische Gesellschaft (AEG) electrical enterprise that was to be dismantled.

Golubtsova personally supervised the MPEI research department, the capital construction department, the campus, and the educational department. She took away from the people's commissars, or in her words, "grabbed captured equipment in Germany" what was needed to equip the MPEI.

With the participation and assistance of Valeria Alekseyevna, the MPEI built the only education and experimental combined heat and power plant in the USSR — the MPEI CHPP with a capacity of 12 megawatts, commissioned in 1951. She achieved the allocation of territory for the construction of rest houses near Moscow and in Crimea, in Аlupka, and when the rest house in Alupka was confiscated from the MPEI and converted into a tuberculosis sanatorium of the All-Union Central Council of Trade Unions, she insisted on compensation, and the MPEI was allocated a site for the construction of a sports camp in Crimea, in the Аlush ta region, which later became a cult place for MPEI students.

Golubtsova actively helped employees in difficult moments of their lives: for many, she "knocked out" work cards and vouchers to a sanatorium. She did not expel Boris Chertok (in the future, a prominent figure in the Soviet rocket and space industry) from the MPEI for debt, and Vladimir Kotelnikov (later a radio physicist) covered up from the Minister of State Security Viktor Abakumov. Among the personal nominees of Golubtsova are MPEI graduates Vladimir Kotelnikov, Boris Chertok, Vladimir Kirillin, Alexander Sheindlin, Alexei Vogomolov, and dozens of professors.

=== Later years and death ===
In 1952, after a serious illness, she was forced to leave the post of director and took up scientific work. From 1953 onwards, she was deputy director of the Institute of the History of Natural Science and Technology. In 1956 she defended her doctoral dissertation on the history of the development of cable technology in the USSR, at the same time she was awarded the academic title of professor in the Department of General Electrical Engineering.

V. A. Golubtsova put forward the idea of publishing and became the editor-in-chief of the capital two-volume History of Power Engineering in the USSR (1957).

After her partner, Georgy Malenkov, was removed from all party and state posts in 1957, she followed him into exile in Oskemen, and later in Ekibastuz. After the death of Malenkov's mother in 1968, they moved to the village of Udelnaya in the Moscow region. In 1971, she was made a political pensioner.

From 1973 onwards, she lived with Malenkov in Moscow, on 2 Sinichkina Street, in a two-room apartment. In 1980, by the order of Yuri Andropov, they were given a two-room apartment on the Frunzenskaya Embankment, where the couple spent the last years of their lives.

Golubtsova died on 1 October 1987. She was buried alongside Malenkov at the Kuntsevo Cemetery in Moscow.

== Family ==
Her partner was Georgy Malenkov, a Soviet statesman and party leader, and an ally of Joseph Stalin. They had three children, who each chose various professions, and who all became doctors of science.

- Volta Malenkova (1924–2010) was an architect. She had one son from her first marriage, Sergei (1946–2010). During her second marriage, she had another son, Alexander Stepanov. Together with Alexander, they had Proterozoic Aleksandrovich Stepanov (1953–2014). Malenkova took part in the construction of the Church of St. George the Victorious in the village of Semyonovskoye near Moscow.
- Andrei Malenkov (born 29 May 1937) is a Doctor of Biological Sciences, a professor, a specialist in the field of biophysics; and the honorary vice-president of the Russian Academy of Natural Sciences.
- Georgy Georgievich Malenkov (born 20 October 1938) is a Doctor of Chemical Sciences, a professor, and a member of the editorial board of the Structural Chemistry Journal.

Grandchildren

- Daria Andreevna Malenkova is a marketing director in a food-related firm.
- Yegor Andreevich Malenkov is a carpenter-restorer, engaged in the restoration of the interior decoration of churches. With his participation, 10 churches were restored.
- Dmitry Andreevich Malenkov is a cardiac surgeon at the Center for Cardiovascular Surgery, A. N. Bakulev of the Ministry of Health of Russia.
- Anastasia Andreevna Malenkova is a lecturer at the Institute of Asian and African Countries of Moscow State University.

== Awards ==
- Order of the Red Banner of Labour (1944) — for the performance by the institute of important work for the front
- Order of the Red Star (1945)— for work on the restoration of the MPEI in wartime
- Various medals of the USSR

== Works ==
- History and Prospects for the Development of Electrical Insulating Materials. — M.: Gosenergoizdat, 1957. — 78 p.
- Issues of Training Engineering Personnel for the Power Industry. // Journal of Electricity, 1946, No. 4. p. 3.

== Sources ==
- Romanov, R. G. (2010). Дела директорские [Director's affairs] (PDF). МЭИ: история, люди, годы. Сборник воспоминаний. Т. 1 [MEI: history, people, years. Collection of memories. Vol. 1]. Выдающиеся деятели МЭИ (Prominent figures of MPEI) (in Russian). Moscow: Издательский дом МЭИ. pp. 298–316. ISBN 978-5-383-00576-7.
