= Anna Chernenko =

Belarusian woman specialized in agriculture (1913–2010)

- Анна Черненко

Spouse of the General Secretary of the Central Committee of the Communist Party of the Soviet Union
- In office 13 February 1984 – 10 March 1985
- Preceded by: Tatyana Andropova
- Succeeded by: Raisa Gorbacheva

Personal details
- Born: Anna Dmitrievna Lyubimova; 3 September 1913
- Died: 25 December 2010 (aged 97)
- Spouse: Konstantin Chernenko (m. 1944; died 1985)
- Occupation: Technician

Anna Chernenko (Russian: Анна Черненко, née Lyubimova; 3 September 1913 – 25 December 2010) was the wife of Soviet leader Konstantin Chernenko.

== Biography ==
Anna Dmitrievna Lyubimova was born into an illiterate family and joined the Pioneer movement and Komsomol in the 1930s. She was educated as a tractor technician.

She was the second wife of Konstantin Chernenko, and the couple had three children: a son and two daughters. She served as the director of the University of Culture. In addition, she worked for Moscow cultural organizations for nearly thirty years, particularly in the house on Kutuzovsky Prospekt. However, Anna left professional life later due to the objection of her sister-in-law who insisted that she should focus on her family.

Anna's husband, Konstantin Chernenko, served as the Soviet head of state from 11 April 1984 to 10 March 1985. She reportedly protested over the election of her husband as party leader in 1984, saying "his health would never stand the strain." When a red telephone line was installed in their bedroom following the appointment of Chernenko it was kept on her side of the bed. She answered the calls and mostly refused to wake him. During this period, she was the patron of Soviet movies.

Anna was described as a modest, kind, shy and courageous woman. She was not a public figure like other spouses of the Soviet leaders and was seen with her husband in parliamentary elections in March 1984. The other public appearance was in her husband's funeral in March 1985.
