= Tatyana Andropova =

Russian pedagog and spouse of Yuri Andropov (1917–1991)

- Татьяна Андропова
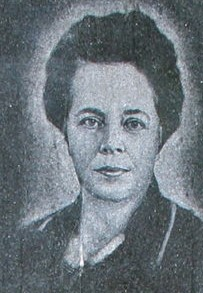

Spouse of the General Secretary of the Central Committee of the Communist Party of the Soviet Union
- In office 12 November 1982 – 9 February 1984
- Preceded by: Viktoria Brezhneva
- Succeeded by: Anna Chernenko

Personal details
- Born: Tatyana Filippovna Lebedeva; 1917
- Died: 1991 (aged 73–74)
- Spouse: Yuri Andropov (m. 1940; died 1984)
- Children: 2
- Occupation: Pedagogue

Tatyana Filippovna Andropova (Russian: Татьяна Филипповна Андропова; née Lebedeva; 1917–1991) was a Soviet woman who was the second wife of Soviet leader Yuri Andropov.

== Biography ==
Lebedeva was born in 1917. She graduated from a pedagogical school and joined the Komsomol activities where she was appointed to the Komsomol in Karelia in 1940. The same year Tatyana met her future husband at the Komsomol work in Petrozavodsk where she was the secretary of the Zaretsk district committee. At that time Yuri Andropov was serving as the first secretary of the Central Committee of the Komsomol of the Karelo-Finnish SSR. Andropov's wife and two children did not move to the region with him when he was appointed the post. Following his contact with Tatyana Yuri Andropov divorced his first wife. Tatyana and Yuri married in Summer 1941 and had two children, Igor and Irina. Igor was born shortly before their marriage which was harmonious.

In 1951 the family began to live in Moscow when Yuri Andropov was assigned to the central committee of the Communist Party. From 1954 to 1957 Yuri Andropov served as the Ambassador Extraordinary and Plenipotentiary of the Soviet Union to Hungary. Tatyana and their children accompanied him. In the late October 1956 extensive protests against the Soviet Union occurred in Budapest, and their residence was besieged by the protestors which had negative long-term effects on Tatyana's health. She left Budapest, but returned there after two months. As a result of this incident Tatyana would experience hypertension and suffer from acute headaches during her lifetime. In addition, since then, she was terrified of crowds and open spaces.

The family lived at Kutuzovsky Prospekt in Moscow where Suslov and Brezhnev also lived. Due to health problems Tatyana did not fulfil the official duties when Andropov was the general secretary of the Communist Party and lived as a recluse in their apartment. She died in 1991.
