= Raisa Gorbacheva =

Wife of Mikhail Gorbachev (1932–1999)

- Раиса Горбачёва
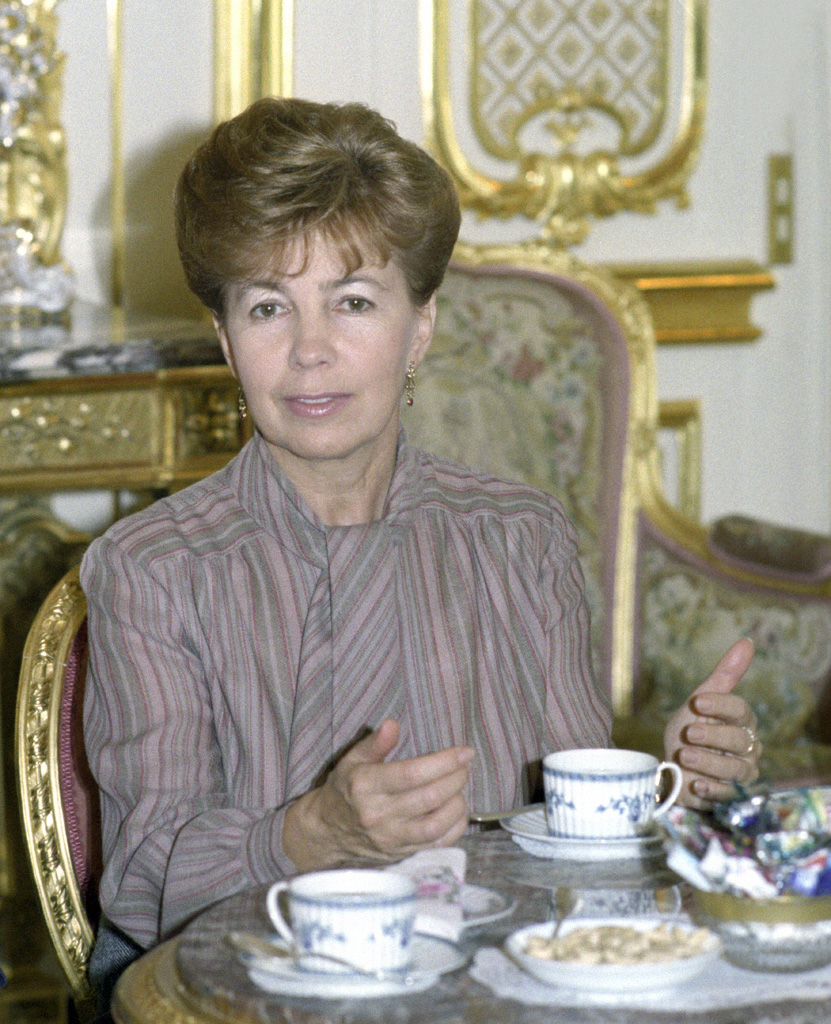
- Gorbacheva in 1985

First Lady of the Soviet Union
- In role 15 March 1990 – 25 December 1991
- President: Mikhail Gorbachev
- Preceded by: Position established
- Succeeded by: Position abolished

Spouse of the General Secretary of the Central Committee of the Communist Party of the Soviet Union
- In role 11 March 1985 – 24 August 1991
- Preceded by: Anna Chernenko
- Succeeded by: Liudmyla Ivashko (acting)

Personal details
- Born: Raisa Maximovna Titarenko; 5 January 1932 Rubtsovsk, West Siberian Krai, Soviet Union
- Died: 20 September 1999 (aged 67) Münster, Germany
- Resting place: Novodevichy Cemetery
- Spouse: Mikhail Gorbachev (m. 1953)
- Children: 1
- Education: Moscow State Pedagogical Institute
- Profession: Activist; philanthropist

Raisa Maximovna Gorbacheva (Note: Russian: Раи́са Макси́мовна Горбачёва, romanized: Raisa Maksimovna Gorbachyova) (Note: In this name that follows East Slavic naming customs, the patronymic is Maximovna and the family name is Gorbacheva or Titarenko.) (née Titarenko; (Note: Russian: Титаренко) 5 January 1932 – 20 September 1999) was a Soviet and Russian activist and philanthropist who was the wife of Soviet leader Mikhail Gorbachev.

She raised funds for the preservation of Russian cultural heritage, fostering of new talent, and treatment programs for children's blood cancer.

== Early life and education ==
Raisa Maximovna Titarenko was born on 5 January 1932 in the city of Rubtsovsk in the Altai region of Siberia. She was the eldest of three children of Maxim Andreyevich Titarenko, a railway engineer from Chernihiv in Ukraine, and his Siberian wife, Alexandra Petrovna Porada, from Veseloyarsk. She spent her childhood in the Ural Mountains, and met her future husband while studying philosophy in Moscow. She earned an advanced degree at the Moscow State Pedagogical Institute and taught briefly at Moscow State University.

== Life with Mikhail Gorbachev ==
She married Mikhail Gorbachev in September 1953 and moved to her husband's home region of Stavropol in southern Russia upon graduation. There she taught Marxist–Leninist philosophy and defended her sociology research thesis about kolkhoz life. She gave birth to a daughter, Irina Mikhailovna (married name: Virganskaya; Ирина Михайловна Вирганская), on 6 January 1957. (Note: According to Mikhail Gorbachev, Gorbacheva had an induced abortion after they married in Moscow due to heart complications associated with an attack of rheumatic fever one year earlier.) When her husband returned to Moscow as a rising Soviet Communist Party official, Gorbacheva took the post of a lecturer at her alma mater, Moscow State University. She left the post when her husband became General Secretary of the Communist Party of the Soviet Union in 1985. Her public appearances beside her husband as first lady were a novelty at home and went a long way in humanizing the country's image. She was one of the few communist party leaders' wives to have a high public profile of her own.

On 1 June 1990, Gorbacheva accompanied U.S. first lady Barbara Bush to Wellesley College in Massachusetts. Both women spoke before the graduating class during the commencement service, touching on the role of women in modern society. All the American television networks covered the addresses live; CNN provided live cable-TV coverage around the world.

The events of the Soviet Coup of 1991, which attempted to depose her husband from power, left a lasting scar on Gorbacheva, who suffered a minor stroke on the final day. The political turmoil that followed pushed the Gorbachevs into the shadows.

== Philanthropy ==
In 1989, following a personal address from Professor Rumyantsev and others, Gorbacheva contributed US$100,000 to the charity "International Association of Hematologists of the World for Children". This and further donations raised by both of the Gorbachevs helped to buy equipment for blood banks and to train Russian doctors abroad.

In 1997 she established the Raisa Maksimovna's Club aimed at galvanizing the participation of women in politics. She also worked to raise awareness of children's issues (she had frequently welcomed youth delegations to the Kremlin when her husband could not be present).

== Illness and death ==
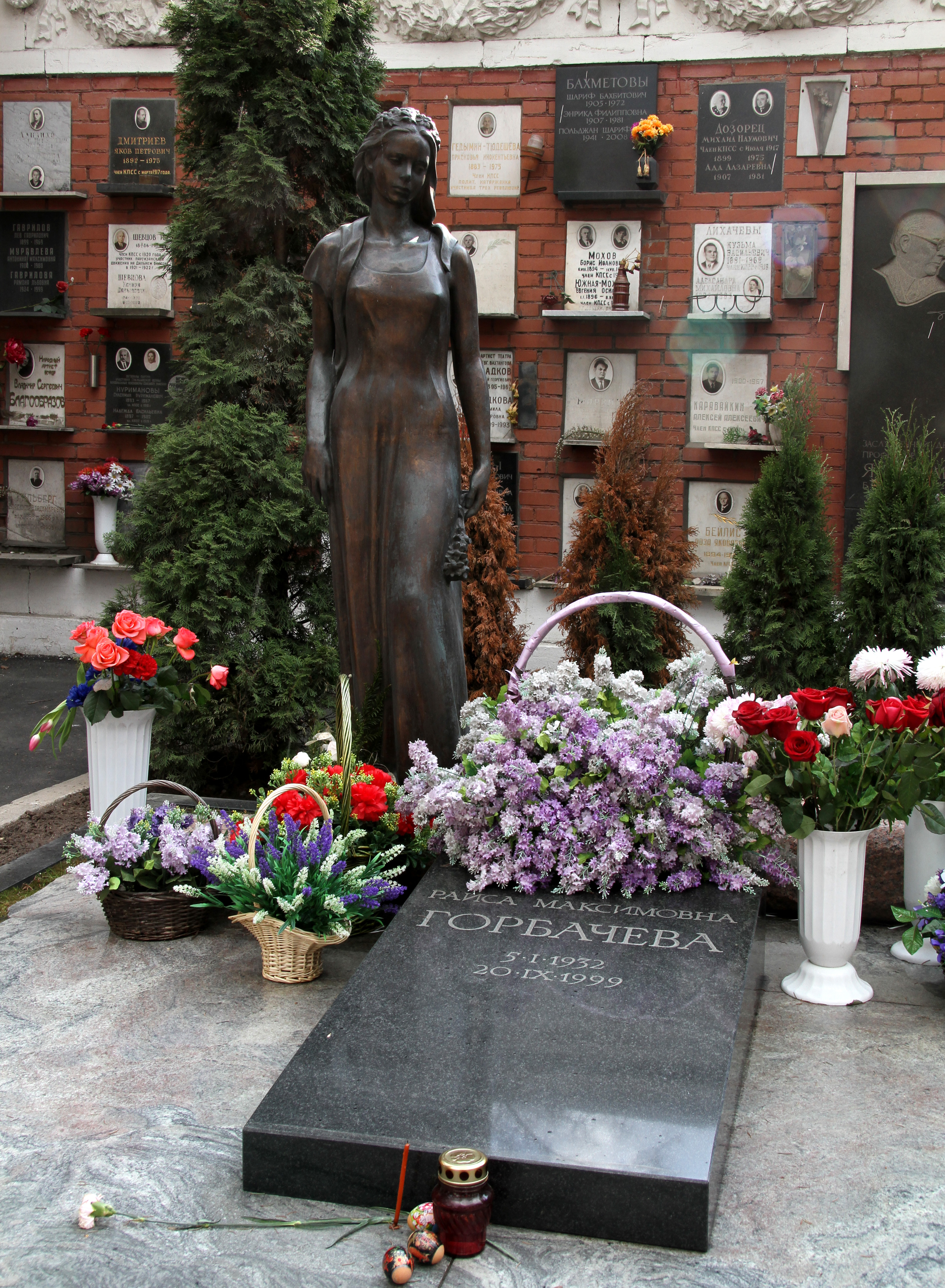
Gorbacheva's grave in 2012. The tombstone was altered in 2022 to accommodate her husband's burial.

Gorbacheva suffered a stroke in October 1993, two years after leaving office as First Lady. In July 1999, she was diagnosed with leukemia by the Institute of Haematology at the Russian Academy of Medical Sciences. Shortly after, she travelled with her husband and daughter to Münster in Germany for treatment at the medical clinic of the Münster University Hospital. She received treatment for two months under the supervision of Thomas Büchner, a leading haematologist, but died on 20 September aged 67. She is buried at Novodevichy Cemetery in Moscow.

== Legacy ==
In 2006, her family founded the Raisa Gorbacheva Foundation, which raises money to support those with childhood cancer.

In 2007, the Raisa Gorbacheva Institute of Pediatric Hematology and Transplantology opened at the First Pavlov State Medical University of St. Petersburg.

== Books ==
- Gorbachyova, Raisa Maksimovna (1991). Ya nadejus'... (in Russian). Kniga. ISBN 5-21200324-5.
- Moroz, B. D. (2000). Raisa. Vospominaniya, dnevniki, interview, statyi, telegrammy (in Russian). Moscow: Vagrius Petro-News. ISBN 5-26400432-3.
