= Igor Kio =

Russian illusionist (1944-2006)

- Игорь Кио
- Born: Igor Emilievich Hirschfeld-Renard; March 13, 1944; Moscow, Russian SFSR, Soviet Union
- Died: August 30, 2006 (aged 62); Moscow, Russia
- Occupation: Illusionist
- Years active: 1960–2006
- Spouse: Galina Brezhneva (m. 1962; div. 1963)

Igor Emilievich Kio (né Hirschfeld-Renard; March 13, 1944 – August 30, 2006), a Russian illusionist with the Russian State Circus, was the son of the legendary magician Emil Kio (1894-1965). At age 5 he began to work with his father, eventually replacing him in the act in 1960. Upon the death of his father in 1965, he inherited the act, which he continued to present in the Soviet Union (and later, in the Russian Federation) and all over the world well into the 21st century.

In 1962, he was married briefly to Galina Brezhneva, the daughter of Leonid Brezhnev; he was 18 years old, she was 33, and already married. Leonid Brezhnev had the marriage immediately cancelled by the KGB: it had lasted only nine days. In 1966, Igor Kio married circus artist Yolanta Olkhovikova (born 1944), who came from a famous Russian circus family. They divorced in 1974, and Yolanta married Igor's elder half-brother, Emil Kio Jr., himself a famous illusionist. Igor's third wife, Viktoria Ivanovna, whom he married in 1977, was a dancer in his company. Together they had a daughter, also named Viktoria.

In addition to his work in the circus ring, Kio often performed on television, including in an annual New Year's Day program in the 1980s. He also appeared on television as a presenter, and featured in a Soviet film, The Girl On The Rolling Globe, in 1966. Igor Kio became a major star of Russian entertainment — known not least for his tumultuous private life.

Igor Kio was a member of the International Brotherhood of Magicians, and won numerous international awards for his work as a magician. The Soviet Government awarded him the title of People's Artist of the Soviet Russian Federative Republic in 1980. The Russian Federal Government awarded him the title of People's Artist of Russia in 2003.

In 1999 Igor Kio published his memoirs, titled Illusions without illusions (Russian: Иллюзии без иллюзий). He died in August 2006 at age 62.
