= Vyacheslav Golubtsov =

- Born: Vyacheslav Alekseyevich Golubtsov; 10 April 1894; Nizhny Novgorod, Russian Empire
- Died: 18 October 1972 (aged 78); Moscow, USSR
- Occupation: specialist in the field of thermal engineering

Vyacheslav Alekseyevich Golubtsov (Russian: Вячеслав Алексеевич Голубцо́в; 10 April 1894 – 18 October 1972) was a Soviet and Russian scientist and a specialist in the field of thermal engineering.

== Biography ==
He was born on 29 March (10 April New Style) in 1894 in Nizhny Novgorod in the family of a teacher. He was a brother of Valeria Golubtsova, the wife of the Soviet statesman Georgy Malenkov.

In 1913–1915 he worked in Pavlovsky Posad as a mechanic and as a technician at Elektrogorsk Power Plant, which was one of the first power plants in Russia. In 1915-1918 he served in Russian Imperial Army. In 1918—1922 he again worked at the Power Plant: first as an Assistant to the Head of the Electric department, then as an Assistant to the Director of the Power plant.

In 1925 Golubtsov graduated from Leningrad Electrotechnical Institute with a degree in the field of electrical power stations engineering. He was a member of the CPSU(b) since 1931. Until 1937 he worked in leading positions in the construction and operation of power plants in Leningrad, Volkhovstroy, Kashira, Chelyabinsk, Dneprodzerzhinsk and other cities. In 1931-1933 he was Chief engineer and Deputy manager of Mosenergo. Since 1937 he was Deputy Chief Engineer of Glavenergo; in 1939–1945, deputy head of the technical department of the People's Commissariat of Power Plants of the USSR.

From 1944 he worked at Moscow Power Engineering Institute, appointed a professor in 1945. He taught in the Department of Boiler Plants. In 1947, he organized, and until 1964 headed, the Department of Water and Fuel Technology. From 1964 he was professor-consultant of MPEI.

He was a Corresponding Member of the USSR Academy of Sciences from 1953, and was awarded the Stalin Prize, III degree, in 1950.

He died on 18 October 1972 in Moscow.
