= Lyubov Brezhneva =

Russian writer

Lyubov Yakovlevna Brezhneva (Russian: Любовь Яковлевна Брежнева; born 1943 in Magnitogorsk) is a niece of Soviet leader Leonid Brezhnev (an illegitimate but acknowledged daughter of Leonid's brother, Yakov Brezhnev). She was hounded by the KGB for many reasons including being somewhat liberal in her political philosophy and for being in love with a colonel from the army of East Germany.

She wrote a book about her experience called, in the English-language edition, The World I Left Behind (Russian: Племянница Генсека, meaning Niece of the General-Secretary). She describes the hypocrisy of the Soviet system from the point of view of a member of the privileged elite or nomenklatura. She also says that they were prisoners of the system.

The most poignant part of her memoirs deals with the cruelties which happened during the Russian Civil War (1918–1922) and collectivization of agriculture (1927–1933), large-scale events which devastated the Cossack communities from which the Brezhnev family came. She did not experience those events personally, having been born after they occurred, but heard of them from family members.

Brezhneva begged her father to protect her from the KGB, which both hated the fact that she had a German boyfriend and also wanted to attack her father (and his corrupt and black marketeer hangers-on), but her father could do nothing and eventually the KGB beat her so severely as to cause a miscarriage.

She describes in her memoir the two-tier (in fact multi-tier) system of shops, goods and services (including healthcare) available to members of the Soviet elite (members of the nomenklatura), in contrast with the barren shops available for the ordinary person. She describes the aimless job she worked, at an office where rooms full of people had nothing to do but file their fingernails. Some of her friends were sent to hard labour in internal exile or detention simply because they could not stand being part of the system.

She eventually married an Armenian. They had a child and lived for a while during the 1980s in Boumerdès, Algeria, about 56 km from Algiers, her husband having been posted there as a Soviet "specialist" advising the Algerian government.

She later fled to a Soviet satellite state and from there emigrated in 1990 to the United States (to California) where she still lives.

Brezhneva now writes and publishes books for children, and is based in San Mateo, California. She also takes an interest in world politics.
