= Nina Kukharchuk-Khrushcheva =

Second wife of Nikita Khrushchev, the former leader of the Soviet Union

Nina Khrushcheva
- Нина Хрущёва
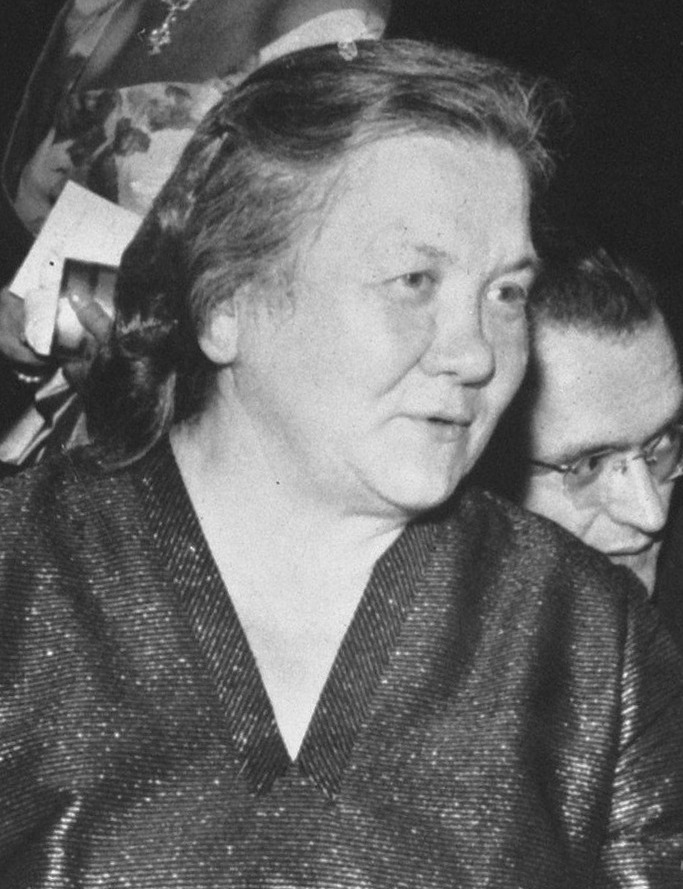
- Khrushcheva in 1961

Spouse of the First Secretary of the Communist Party of the Soviet Union
- In office 14 September 1953 – 14 October 1964
- Preceded by: Position established Valeriya Golubtsova (de facto)
- Succeeded by: Viktoria Brezhneva

Personal details
- Born: Nina Petrovna Kukharchuk; 14 April 1900 Wasylów, Lublin Governorate, Russian Empire
- Died: 13 August 1984 (aged 84) Moscow, Russian SFSR, Soviet Union
- Resting place: Novodevichy Cemetery, Moscow
- Party: Communist Party of the Soviet Union; Communist Party of Western Ukraine
- Spouse: Nikita Khrushchev (m. 1965; died 1971)
- Children: 3, including Sergei
- Education: Sverdlov Communist University; N. K. Krupskaya Communist Education Academy

Nina Petrovna Kukharchuk-Khrushcheva (Note: Also transliterated as Khrushchyova) (Note: Russian: Нина Петровна Хрущёва Ukrainian: Ні́на Петрі́вна Хрущо́ва, romanized: Nina Petrivna Khrushchova) (née Kukharchuk; (Note: Russian and Ukrainian: Кухарчук) 14 April 1900 – 13 August 1984) was the second wife of the Soviet leader Nikita Khrushchev.

== Biography ==
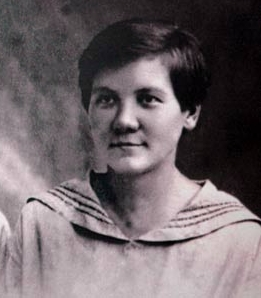
Nina Khrushcheva, 1924

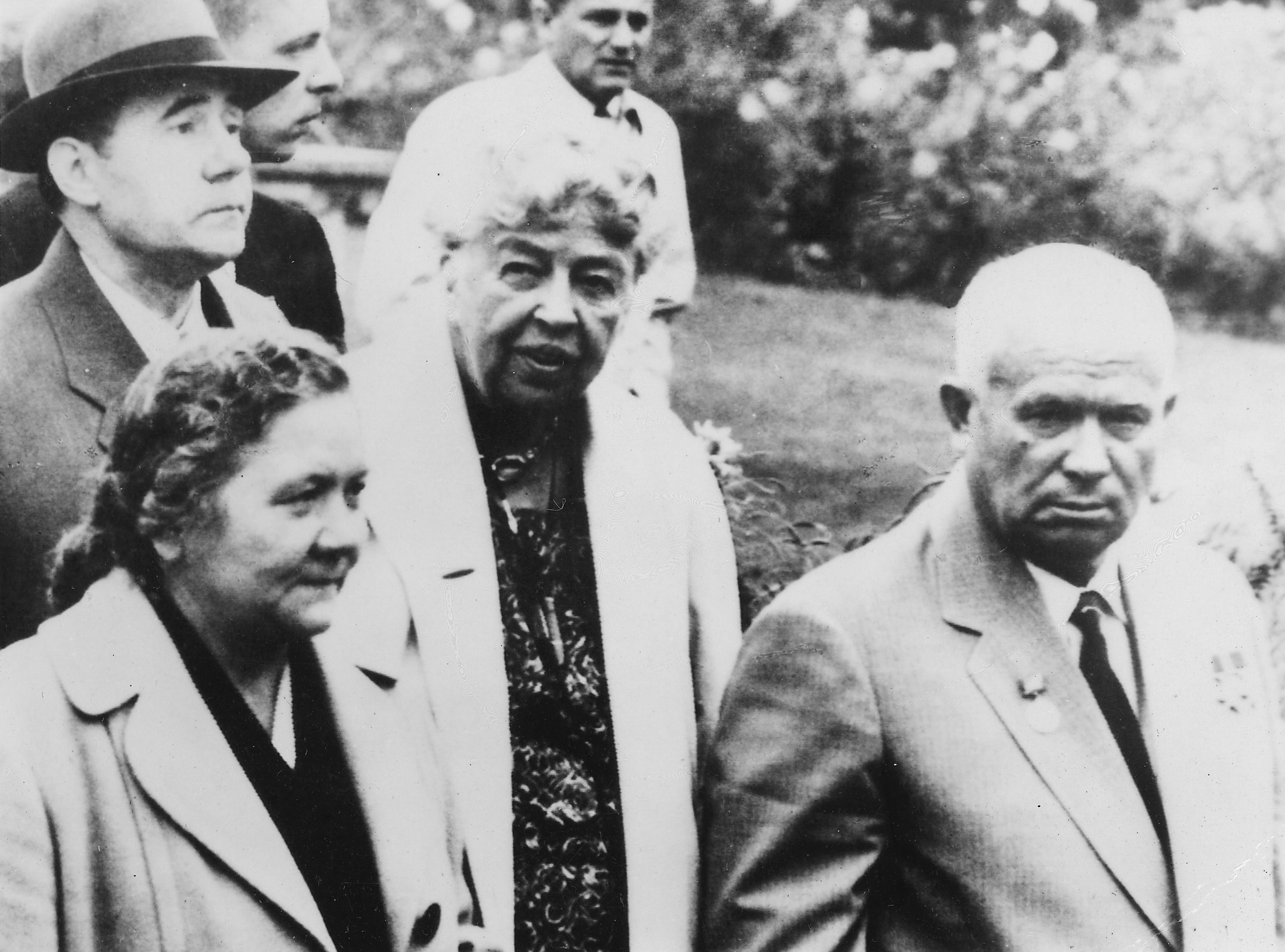
Andrei Gromyko, Nina Khrushcheva, Eleanor Roosevelt and Nikita Khrushchev in Hyde Park, New York, in 1959

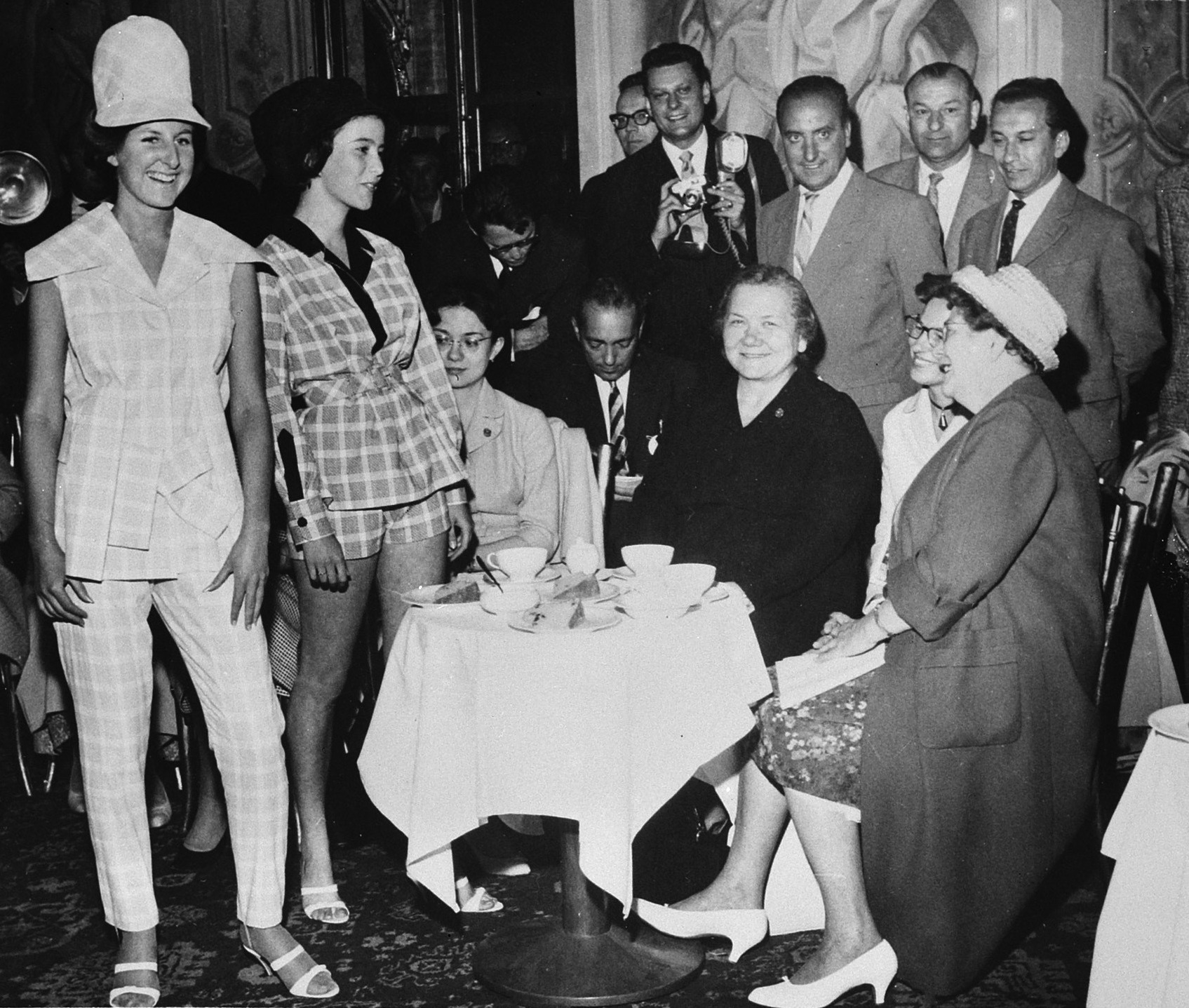
Nina Khrushcheva at a fashion show in 1960

Nina Kukharchuk was born in the small village of Wasylów in the Russian Empire (present-day Poland). Her parents, Petro Vasyliovych Kukharchuk (Note: Ukrainian: Петро Васильович Кухарчук) and Kateryna Petrivna Bondarchuk, (Note: Ukrainian: Катерина Григорівна Бондарчук) were Ukrainian peasants. After completing three years of primary school in her village, in 1912 she enrolled in a school in Lublin, and then in a senior school in Chełm.

After the beginning of World War I, Kukharchuk relocated to Odessa, where she studied until 1919 and worked as a secretary. In 1919, she joined the Bolsheviks in Odessa. Kukharchuk fluently spoke French, Polish, Russian, Ukrainian as well as her local Ukrainian dialect, and she became one of the leaders of the Young Communist League in Odessa, then occupied by the French. Kukharchuk and Taras Franko, the son of Ivan Franko, then joined the Galician party bureau, created at the order of Vladimir Lenin, to spread communist ideas among the Ukrainian Galician Army. In June 1920, she was appointed as an agitator to the Polish front and became the leader of the education department and of the women's department of the Central Committee of the Communist Party of Western Ukraine. Later that year, Kukharchuk was sent to Moscow to continue her studies.

In 1921, she became a teacher at a Communist Party school in Bakhmut, but soon became ill with typhus, and after recovery was moved to a similar school in Donetsk. There, in 1922, Kukharchuk met Nikita Khrushchev, with whom she spent most of her remaining life. In 1926, Kukharchuk was again sent to Moscow, to study political economy, and after that taught at a party school in Kiev. In 1929, in Kiev, she gave birth to Rada, her first child with Khrushchev. She also took care of Khrushchev's two children from his previous marriage, and when in 1930 Khrushchev was sent to Moscow, she followed him there. In Moscow, Kukharchuk lived with Khrushchev's parents and worked as a party leader at a lamp factory. In 1935, she gave birth to their son Sergei, and in 1937, to their daughter Elena, who died at the age 35 due to poor health.

In 1938, Khrushchev was appointed as the First Secretary of the Communist Party of Ukraine, and his family returned to Kiev, but only three years later they were evacuated to Samara due to the German invasion of the Soviet Union.

After Khrushchev became the Soviet leader in 1953, Kukharchuk became the first lady of the Soviet Union, in a position that was non-existent with previous Soviet leaders. In contrast to her predecessors, she accompanied Khrushchev in his foreign trips, took part in official events, and was the de facto manager of Khrushchev's private life. She could communicate in five languages: Russian, Ukrainian, Polish, French and English, which she studied for many years in various Communist Party schools.

Kukharchuk and Khrushchev officially married only in 1965, after Khrushchev was retired from office. Despite popular belief, she never took her husband's last name, instead opting to hyphenate and add it after her own. After his death, she spent the rest of her life in Zhukovka in Moscow Oblast. She died on 13 August 1984, at the age of 84.
