= Semyonovskoye-Sovetskoye =

Semyonovskoye-Sovetskoye Семеновское-Советское
- Selo
- Location within Vladimir Oblast Location within Russia
- Coordinates: 56°22′N 40°15′E
- Country: Russia
- Region: Vladimir Oblast
- District: Suzdalsky District
- Time zone: UTC+3:00

Semyonovskoye-Sovetskoye (Russian: Семеновское-Советское) is a rural locality (a selo) in Seletskoye Rural Settlement, Suzdalsky District, Vladimir Oblast, Russia. There are 4 streets; and the population was 9 as of 2010.

== Geography ==
Semyonovskoye-Sovetskoye is located 15 km southwest of Suzdal (the district's administrative centre) by road. Vysheslavskoye is the nearest rural locality.
