= Viktoria Brezhneva =

First Lady of the Soviet Union (1907–1995)

- Виктория Брежнева

Spouse of the General Secretary of the Central Committee of the Communist Party of the Soviet Union
- In office 14 October 1964 – 10 November 1982
- Preceded by: Nina Kukharchuk-Khrushcheva
- Succeeded by: Tatyana Andropova

Personal details
- Born: Viktoria Petrovna Denisova; 11 December 1907 Belgorod, Kursk Governorate, Russian Empire
- Died: 5 July 1995 (aged 87) Moscow, Russia
- Party: Communist Party of the Soviet Union
- Spouse: Leonid Brezhnev (m. 1928; died 1982)
- Children: Galina; Yuri

Viktoria Petrovna Brezhneva (Russian: Виктория Петровна Брежнева, IPA: [vʲɪkˈtorʲɪjə pʲɪˈtrovnə ˈbrʲeʐnʲɪvə]; née Denisova [Дени́сова], IPA: [dʲɪˈnʲisəvə]; 11 December 1907 – 5 July 1995) was the wife of Soviet politician and longtime General Secretary Leonid Brezhnev. She was the mother of Yuri Brezhnev and Galina Brezhneva.

== Biography ==
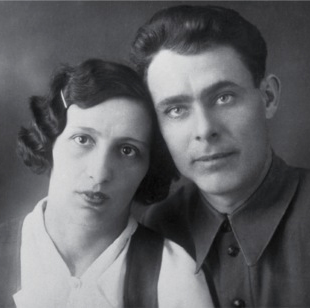
Leonid and Viktoria Brezhnev as a young couple, 1927

She was born in Belgorod in 1908 as Viktoria Petrovna Denisova (Дени́сова). It is claimed by historian Robert Service that she was of Jewish ancestry but Denisova herself has denied having any Jewish ancestry. She met Leonid Brezhnev in 1926 and they married in 1928. The following year, Viktoria gave birth to their first child, Galina. Four years later, their second child, Yuri, was born. Viktoria's relationship with Brezhnev was described as "old fashioned" and one that "without exaggeration [could] be called gentle".

According to the memoirs of Brezhnev's relatives, Viktoria encouraged Brezhnev's materialistic outlook. During Brezhnev's General Secretaryship, Viktoria remained at the sidelines; she did not like attracting public attention. Her last appearance in public was at Brezhnev's state funeral in 1982. Following the death of Brezhnev, Viktoria lived on for another 13 years, living in Brezhnev's old apartment for the remainder of her life.

Victoria Petrovna Brezhneva died on July 5, 1995 after struggling for several years with diabetes. She was buried next to her parents at Novodevichy Cemetery in Moscow. Her daughter, Galina, did not attend the funeral although the rest of the family did.
