= Emil Kio =

Soviet illusionist (1894–1965)

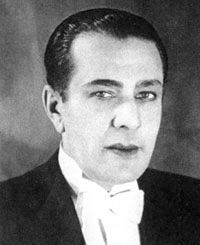

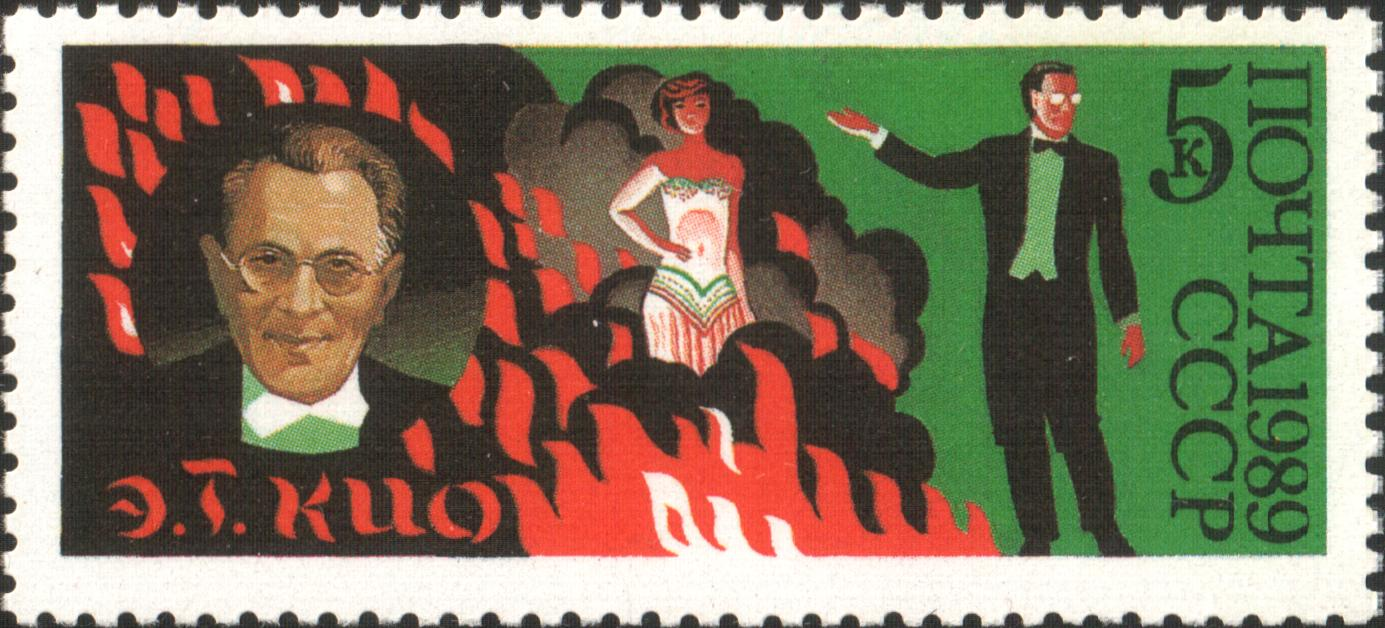
A 1989 Soviet stamp dedicated to Kio

Emil Teodorovich Kio (né Emil Teodorovich Girshfeld-Renard) (Russian: Эмиль Теодорович Кио, Эмиль Теодорович Гиршфельд-Ренард; 11 April 1894 – 19 December 1965) was a Soviet illusionist, People's Artist of the RSFSR.

His sons, Igor Kio and Emil Kio, Jr., became famous Soviet magicians as well.
