= Yuri Brezhnev =

Soviet politician (1933–2013)

- Юрий Брежнев

First Deputy Minister of Foreign Trade
- In office 1979–1986
- Minister: Nikolai Patolichev; Boris Aristov
- Premier: Alexei Kosygin; Nikolai Tikhonov; Nikolai Ryzhkov

Personal details
- Born: Yuri Leonidovich Brezhnev; 31 March 1933 Kamenskoye, Dnipropetrovsk Oblast, Ukrainian SSR, USSR (present-day Ukraine)
- Died: 3 August 2013 (aged 80) Moscow, Russia
- Party: Communist Party of the Soviet Union
- Spouse: Lyudmila Vladimirovna Brezhneva
- Relations: Galina Brezhneva (sister)
- Children: Andrei Brezhnev; Leonid Brezhnev
- Parent(s): Leonid Brezhnev; Viktoria Denisova

Yuri Leonidovich Brezhnev (Russian: Юрий Леонидович Брежнев; 31 March 1933 – 3 August 2013) was a Soviet politician and the son of Soviet politician and longtime Soviet leader Leonid Brezhnev and Viktoria Denisova.

== Life and career ==
Before his retirement, Brezhnev was a Candidate Member of the Central Committee (CC) of the 26th Congress of the Communist Party of the Soviet Union (CPSU), and worked as a First Deputy Minister of the Ministry of Foreign Economic Relations. After his forced retirement following allegations of embezzlement and corruption, Brezhnev became a pensioner. Soon after becoming a pensioner, he was arrested by police, and all his belongings were confiscated.

In contrast to his sister, Galina Brezhneva, who was known for her temper and self-gratification, Brezhnev was a shadowy figure who disliked public attention. His friends and colleagues claim that he only maintained relations with fellow students of the Diplomatic Academy of the Ministry of Foreign Affairs of the Russian Federation. Brezhnev was not active in politics following the dissolution of the Soviet Union in 1991.

After the Soviet Union's collapse, he stopped making public appearances, and rejected an offer made by the Russian government to cooperate with them. In 2000, Brezhnev rejected an offer to appear on a documentary detailing the "Era of Stagnation", an era some believe Brezhnev's father started. He denied these allegations, claiming that his father had nothing to do with the dissolution of the Soviet Union.

He was married to Lyudmila Vladimirovna. She gave birth to two sons, Andrei and Leonid. Andrei Brezhnev (15 March 1961 – 10 July 2018) accused the Communist Party of the Russian Federation (CPRF) of deviating from communist ideology and launched the unsuccessful All-Russian Communist Movement in the late 1990s. He was Secretary General of the All-Russian Communist Movement in 1998. By 2004, Andrei had become a well-established member of the CPRF.
