= Galina Brezhneva =

Daughter of the General Secretary of the Communist Party of the Soviet Union

- Галина Брежнева

Personal details
- Born: Galina Leonidovna Brezhneva; 18 April 1929 Sverdlovsk, Russian SFSR, Soviet Union
- Died: 30 June 1998 (aged 69) Dobryniha, Moscow Oblast, Russia
- Party: Communist Party of the Soviet Union
- Spouses: Eugene (Yevgeny Timofeyevich) Milaev (m. 1951; div. 1961) Igor Kio (m. 1961; div. 1963) Yuri Churbanov (m. 1971; div. 1993) Unknown (m. 1993)
- Relations: Yuri Brezhnev (brother)
- Children: 1 biological and 2 step-children
- Parent(s): Leonid Brezhnev (father); Viktoria Brezhneva (mother)

Galina Leonidovna Brezhneva (Russian: Галина Леонидовна Брежнева; 18 April 1929 – 30 June 1998) was the daughter of Soviet politician and General Secretary of the Communist Party of the Soviet Union, Leonid Brezhnev, and his wife, Viktoria Brezhneva.

== Life and death ==
Galina Brezhneva was born on 18 April 1929 in Sverdlovsk, Russian SFSR, Soviet Union. She was the first child of Leonid Brezhnev and Viktoria Petrovna Brezhneva (née Denisova). Within the family, she was given the affectionate nickname "Galya".

The same year she was born, Galina's father joined the Communist Party. At the time he was working as a land manager for the Party and Galina was a year old, the family moved in with Galina's paternal grandparents on the Pelina street in Kamenskoye. Her father, being a student, was then granted student housing where, in 1933, Galina's younger brother, Yuri, was born. To support the family her father worked several day jobs, including as stoker and steam engine lubricator and fitter, and by night he studied to become a metallurgist. Her mother, who had been a midwife before marriage, tended to the children and the home.

During this period the USSR endured devastating and widespread famine, but by virtue of her father's being a Party functionary, even if only a low-ranking one, the Brezhnev family had sufficient access to food and avoided starvation.

Between supporting his family and his obligations to the Party, Galina's father was often away from home and rarely saw his family.

In July 1941, the Soviet Union was invaded by Nazi Germany and the Brezhnev's hometown was shelled by German artillery. They nonetheless remained until being forced to evacuate to Almaty in Kazakhstan in August of the same year. Galina's father subsequently left her, her brother, and her mother to go and join the war effort.

After the liberation of Dnepropetrovsk in November 1943, the family was able to return to their home, but Galina would not see her father again until the war ended in 1945.

In June 1945, her father was promoted to chief of the political administration of the Fourth Ukrainian Front. Benefits granted in connection with the Moscow Victory Day Parade held to celebrate the end of WWII included his being allowed to visit his family and spend a week with them.

Later the same year, Brezhnev was tasked by Stalin to implement the sovietization of Ruthenia and Bucovina. He flew to Dnepropetrovsk to fetch his family and they settled in Chernovtsy before moving to Zaporizhzhia, where Galina would attend school and graduate in 1947.

As a teenager, she refused to become a member of the Komsomol.

In 1950, her father, who had steadily been rising through the ranks of the Party, became First Secretary of the Communist Party of Moldova. He and Galina's mother then moved to Kishinev at Sadovaya ulitsa, while Galina and her brother remained in Ukraine.

Galina began pursuing a degree in history in Dnepropetrovsk, but later abandoned her studies, instead joining her parents in Kishinev in 1951. She subsequently enrolled at Chișinău State University and began studying literature and philosophy, ultimately earning her degree.

Her time at Chișinău State University was not a positive experience, however, as the students knew of her father's high position in the Party, which socially ostracized her. Consequently, none of her classmates dared even speak to her. Bored, she formed her own friend group, and they drank together frequently. On one occasion, when she and her friends took a taxi to a secret military base in Chișinău, the guards there recognized her as Brezhnev's daughter and turned a blind eye out of fear of provoking trouble.

Galina married for the first time to circus artist, Yevgeny Timofeyevich Milaev (1910–1983) in 1951. They first met in Dnepropetrovsk when Milaev's company performed there. Since Galina's father loved the circus the family went to many of the performances.

Milaev had twin children, Alexander "Sasha" and Natalya "Natasha" (born 1948) from his first marriage to Natalya Yurchenko who died from blood poisoning during childbirth. They had one daughter, Viktoria Yevgenyevna Milaeva (1952–2018). After her divorce, Galina lived in the same house as her parents on Kutuzovskiy prospekt. Out of concern for what company Galina was finding herself in, Galina's father arranged for her to move into an apartment next to her parents, having the wall between the two removed and the entrance to her apartment bricked up.

She was married briefly to Igor Kio, a union that lasted only ten days. By 1971, her father had become displeased with the way things were going in her life. He wanted to arrange a marriage for her after having her second marriage annulled. She ended up selecting Yuri Churbanov from a number of suitors, despite Churbanov already being married and having children. By the end of her father's life, Galina went out in public much less, and while Yuri Andropov was in office, she disappeared from the public eye altogether. She nonetheless made a public comeback during Konstantin Chernenko's short rule and appeared in a conference commemorating International Women's Day. At the conference, she wore just one piece of jewelry, the Order of Lenin that she had been awarded by Andrei Gromyko in 1978 for her fiftieth birthday.

Later, after Churbanov had been arrested on charges of corruption, Brezhneva divorced him. She married for a fourth and final time at the age of 64, to a 29-year-old man. Before her death, Brezhneva was a guest on British television to talk about life in the USSR. In her later life, Brezhneva gradually became a heavy drinker, and her daughter placed her in a psychiatric hospital where she died on 30 June 1998, aged 69.

== Personal life and rumors ==
Historian Larisa Vasil'eva wrote in her book that "Galina Brezhneva was an all-too-typical product of what came to be known as the Era of Stagnation". Brezhneva was a heavy drinker and was known to be heavy-tempered. She was promiscuous and had little self-discipline, and had a seemingly natural tendency toward self-gratification. She was known for her passion for jewellery and diamonds. Why and how Brezhneva received the diamonds in her possession was unknown to the majority of the population during her father's career, though according to a former director of Yuvelirtorg, the state-run jewellery company in the USSR, all jewelry and valuables seized from criminals were given to members of the nomenklatura. Many rumors circulated in Soviet society about Brezhneva, most notably during Leonid Brezhnev's tenure as General Secretary; these rumors have been colloquially termed "diamond legends". In one such story, Brezhneva, during her visit to the Georgian SSR, visited a museum where she noticed two relics on display. She then demanded the two relics to be given to her as a gift. The museum director refused to comply and instead called the First Secretary of the Georgian Communist Party, Eduard Shevardnadze, to discuss the matter with General Secretary Brezhnev. Shevardnadze told Brezhnev that given her Georgian national heritage, her behaviour was unacceptable; Brezhnev agreed and ordered his daughter back to Moscow.

Stories such as these greatly affected Leonid Brezhnev. He said once to a party colleague that "The world respects you, but your own family causes you pain". At the height of perestroika, a reform initiated by Mikhail Gorbachev, many of the rumours about Brezhneva became increasingly wild and questionable; new details and information, possibly apocryphal, were increasingly included in the rumours. In popular culture, these rumours helped depict the Brezhnev era as an "Era of Stagnation". Many of the rumours stemmed from the fact that most of Brezhneva's friends and colleagues had earlier been arrested, and the majority of them had been linked to some sort of corruption or vice.

== Embezzlement ==
In January 1982, as part of Andropov's anti-corruption campaign while Leonid Brezhnev was still alive, several prominent jewellery smugglers who all had links with Brezhneva were arrested, some of them even receiving the death sentence. It was later proven that Brezhneva was smuggling jewellery out of the Soviet Union on such a scale as to threaten the business of De Beers Consolidated Mines. Brezhneva was detained by the authorities, being summoned in one instance to the KGB headquarters for questioning. Her being the daughter of Leonid Brezhnev resulted in dismissal of the charges against her; she was, however, internally exiled by the Andropov administration. When Mikhail Gorbachev became General Secretary, the criminal investigations against Brezhneva and her brother, Yuri Brezhnev, were resumed. Her brother, a former First Deputy of the Ministry of Foreign Trade, and her husband, Yuri Churbanov, were both arrested on charges of corruption. However, investigators were never able to produce any solid charges against Brezhneva for her post-1982 criminal activities. In her later life, Brezhneva had become an alcoholic and usually signed statements without reading them properly.
