= Leonid Brezhnev =

Leader of the Soviet Union from 1964 to 1982

- Леонид Брежнев
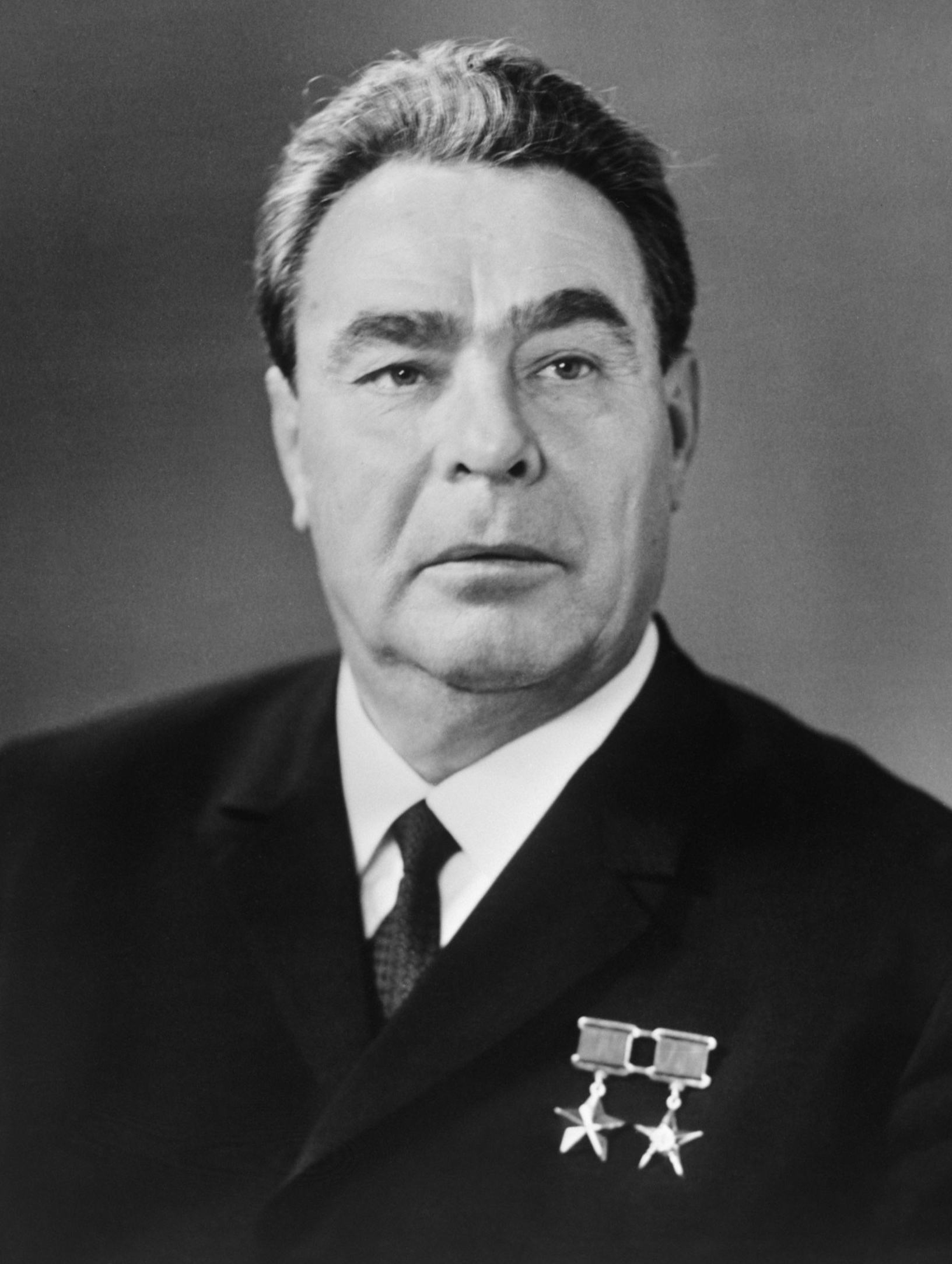
- Official portrait, 1972

General Secretary of the Communist Party of the Soviet Union (Note: Known as First Secretary of the Communist Party of the Soviet Union from 14 October 1964 to 8 April 1966. The office was subsequently renamed back to General Secretary at the 23rd Party Congress, which had been its name from 1922 to 1952.)
- In office 14 October 1964 – 10 November 1982
- Preceded by: Nikita Khrushchev (as First Secretary)
- Succeeded by: Yuri Andropov

Chairman of the Presidium of the Supreme Soviet of the Soviet Union
- In office 16 June 1977 – 10 November 1982
- Premier: Alexei Kosygin; Nikolai Tikhonov
- Deputy: Vasily Kuznetsov
- Preceded by: Nikolai Podgorny
- Succeeded by: Vasily Kuznetsov (acting)
- In office 7 May 1960 – 15 July 1964
- Premier: Nikita Khrushchev
- Preceded by: Kliment Voroshilov
- Succeeded by: Anastas Mikoyan

Second Secretary of the Communist Party of the Soviet Union
- In office 15 July 1964 – 14 October 1964
- Preceded by: Frol Kozlov
- Succeeded by: Nikolai Podgorny
Additional positions
First Secretary of the Communist Party of Kazakhstan
In office 8 May 1955 – 6 March 1956
Preceded by	Panteleimon Ponomarenko
Succeeded by	Ivan Yakovlev
First Secretary of the Communist Party of Moldavia
In office 3 November 1950 – 16 April 1952
Preceded by	Nicolae Coval
Succeeded by	Dimitri Gladki

Personal details
- Born: 19 December 1906 Kamenskoye, Russian Empire
- Died: 10 November 1982 (aged 75) Zarechye, Moscow Oblast, Soviet Union
- Cause of death: Heart attack
- Resting place: Kremlin Wall Necropolis, Moscow
- Party: CPSU (1929–1982)
- Spouse: Viktoria Denisova (m. 1928)
- Children: Galina Brezhneva; Yuri Brezhnev
- Profession: Metallurgical engineer; civil servant
- Awards: Full list

Military service
- Allegiance: Soviet Union
- Branch/service: Soviet Armed Forces
- Years of service: 1941–1982
- Rank: Marshal of the Soviet Union (1976–1982)
- Commands: Soviet Armed Forces
- Battles/wars: World War II; Soviet–Afghan War
- Central institution membership: 1957–1982: Full member, 20th, 22nd, 23rd, 24th, 25th, 26th Politburo; 1956–1982: Member, 20th, 22nd, 23rd, 24th, 25th, 26th Secretariat; 1956–1957: Candidate member, 20th Presidium; 1952–1953: Candidate member, 19th Presidium; 1952–1982: Full member, 19th, 20th, 22nd, 23rd, 24th, 25th, 26th Central Committee; Other political offices held: 1964–1982: Chairman, Defense Council; 1964–1966: Chairman, Bureau of the Central Committee of the Russian SFSR; Jan–Mar 1958: Deputy chairman, Bureau of the Central Committee of the Russian SFSR; 1947–1950: First Secretary, Dnipropetrovsk Regional Committee; 1946–1947: First Secretary, Zaporizhzhia Regional Committee; 1940–1941: Head, Defense Industry Department of the Dnipropetrovsk Regional Committee; 1938–1939: Head, Trade Department of the Dnipropetrovsk Regional Committee; 1937–1938: Deputy chairman, Dnipropetrovsk City Council; 1936–1937: Director, Dnipropetrovsk Regional Committee; Military offices held: 1953–1954: Deputy Head, Main Political Directorate of the Soviet Army and Navy; 1953: Head, Political Department of the Ministry of the Navy; 1945–1946: Head, Political Directorate of the Carpathian Military District; May–Jul 1945: Head, Political Directorate of the Fourth Ukrainian Front; 1944–1945: Deputy Head, Political Directorate of the Fourth Ukrainian Front; 1943–1944: Head, Political Department of the 18th Army of the North Caucasian Front; 1942–1943: Deputy Head, Political Department of the Black Sea Group of the Transcaucasian Front; 1941–1942: Deputy Head, Political Department of the Southern Front; Leader of the Soviet Union: ← Khrushchev; Andropov →

Leonid Ilyich Brezhnev (Note: /ˈbrɛʒnɛf/; Russian: Леонид Ильич Брежнев [lʲɪɐˈnʲit ɨˈlʲjidʑ ˈbrʲeʐnʲɪf]; Ukrainian: Леонід Ілліч Брежнєв, romanized: Leonid Illich Brezhniev [leoˈn⁽ʲ⁾id iˈl⁽ʲ⁾ːidʒ ˈbrɛʒnʲeu̯].) (19 December 1906 – 10 November 1982) was a Soviet politician who served as General Secretary of the Communist Party of the Soviet Union from 1964 until his death in 1982. He also held office as Chairman of the Presidium of the Supreme Soviet (head of state) from 1960 to 1964 and later from 1977 to 1982. His tenure as General Secretary was second only to Joseph Stalin's in duration.

Brezhnev was born to a working-class family in Kamenskoye within the Yekaterinoslav Governorate of the Russian Empire. After the October Revolution created the Soviet Union, he joined the ruling Communist party's youth league in 1923 before becoming an official party member in 1929. When Nazi Germany invaded the Soviet Union in June 1941, he joined the Red Army as a commissar and rose rapidly through the ranks to become a major general during World War II. After the war ended, Brezhnev was promoted to the party's Central Committee in 1952 and became a full member of the Politburo by 1957. In 1964, he took part in the removal of Nikita Khrushchev as leader of the Soviet Union and replaced him as First Secretary of the CPSU. When Khrushchev was ousted, Brezhnev formed a triumvirate alongside Premier Alexei Kosygin and CC Secretary Nikolai Podgorny that initially led the country in Khrushchev's place. By the end of the 1960s, he had successfully consolidated power to become the dominant figure within the Soviet leadership.

In the short term, Brezhnev's governance improved the Soviet Union's international standing while stabilizing the position of its ruling party at home. Whereas Khrushchev regularly enacted policies without consulting the Politburo, Brezhnev was careful to minimize dissent among the party elite by reaching decisions through consensus, thereby restoring the semblance of collective leadership. Additionally, while pushing for détente between the two Cold War superpowers, he achieved nuclear parity with the United States and strengthened Moscow's dominion over Central and Eastern Europe. Furthermore, the country's massive arms buildup and widespread military interventionism under Brezhnev's leadership served to substantially expand Soviet influence abroad, particularly in the Middle East and Africa. By the mid-1970s, numerous observers argued that the Soviet Union had surpassed the United States to become the world's strongest military power.

Conversely, Brezhnev's leadership also witnessed a significant increase in repression and censorship throughout the Soviet Union compared with the relatively liberal years of the Khrushchev Thaw. Ultimately, Brezhnev's hostility towards political and economic reform ushered in an era of socioeconomic decline referred to as the Era of Stagnation. In addition to pervasive corruption within the country, this period was characterized by the shrinking availability of consumer goods and declining economic growth.

After 1975, Brezhnev's health rapidly deteriorated and he increasingly withdrew himself from governing the country despite remaining its highest authority. He eventually died on 10 November 1982 and was succeeded as General Secretary by Yuri Andropov. Upon coming to power in 1985, Mikhail Gorbachev denounced Brezhnev's government for its inefficiency and inflexibility before launching a campaign to liberalize the Soviet Union. Notwithstanding the backlash to his regime's policies in the mid-1980s, Brezhnev's rule has received consistently high approval ratings in public polls conducted in post-Soviet Russia.

== Early life and early career ==
=== 1906–1939: Origins ===
Leonid Ilyich Brezhnev was born on 19 December 1906 in Kamenskoye (now Kamianske, Ukraine) within the Yekaterinoslav Governorate of the Russian Empire to metalworker Ilya Yakovlevich Brezhnev (1874–1934) and his wife, Natalia Denisovna Mazalova (1886–1975). His father lived in Brezhnevo, Kursk Governorate, before moving to Kamenskoye. The parents of Brezhnev's mother came from Yenakiieve. Brezhnev's ethnicity was given as Ukrainian in some documents, including his passport, and Russian in others.

Brezhnev's niece wrote that in 1913, Brezhnev enrolled in a parish school. Two years later, he was admitted to a grammar school. Brezhnev left Kamenskoe for Kursk due to the famine of 1921–1923 and got employment as a porter at a cooking fat factory.

In 1923, Brezhnev joined the Komsomol, the Bolshevik youth organization. His biographer Paul J. Murphy believed he did it for careerist reasons. In the same year, Brezhnev enrolled at a college and four years later got a degree in land management. He started to work a year before graduation, first as a trainee in the Byelorussian SSR and, after receiving the diploma, in the Kursk Governorate and later in the Ural Oblast. During his work there, Brezhnev applied for Communist Party membership in 1929, spending two years as a candidate before becoming a full Party member two years later. Brezhnev reached the position of head of the land registry of Sverdlovsk in 1930, but relinquished it just half a year later to move to Moscow to enroll at the Institute of Agricultural Machinery. Historian Susanne Schattenberg speculates that he did so to avoid the excesses of collectivization that the Soviet Union was undergoing at that time.

Brezhnev did not stay in Moscow for long and left only two months later due to a housing shortage. Initially, he worked as a fitter at a plant in Zaporozhye. A year later, he enrolled in an evening program to study thermal engineering, while simultaneously working at the Dnieper Metallurgical Combine. While still a student, Brezhnev was appointed as the director of the Workers’ Faculty in 1933. He graduated from the institute in 1935, but worked as an engineer for less than half a year before being drafted into the Red Army. During his one-year service, Brezhnev received military training in Chita and became a political commissar of a tank division.

During Stalin's Great Purge, Brezhnev was one of many apparatchiks who exploited the resulting openings in the government and the party to advance rapidly in the regime's ranks. In 1936, he was appointed director of the Dniprodzerzhynsk Technical College and a year later he became Deputy Chairman of the Kamenskoye City Soviet. In May 1938, he obtained a position in Dnepropetrovsk and met Nikita Khrushchev, who had just taken control of the Ukrainian Communist Party. This relationship would be decisive for Brezhnev's future career. In 1939, he was appointed propaganda secretary of the Dnipropetrovsk party committee. During this time, Brezhnev took the first steps toward building a network of supporters which came to be known as the "Dnipropetrovsk Mafia" that would greatly aid his rise to power.

=== 1941–1945: World War II ===
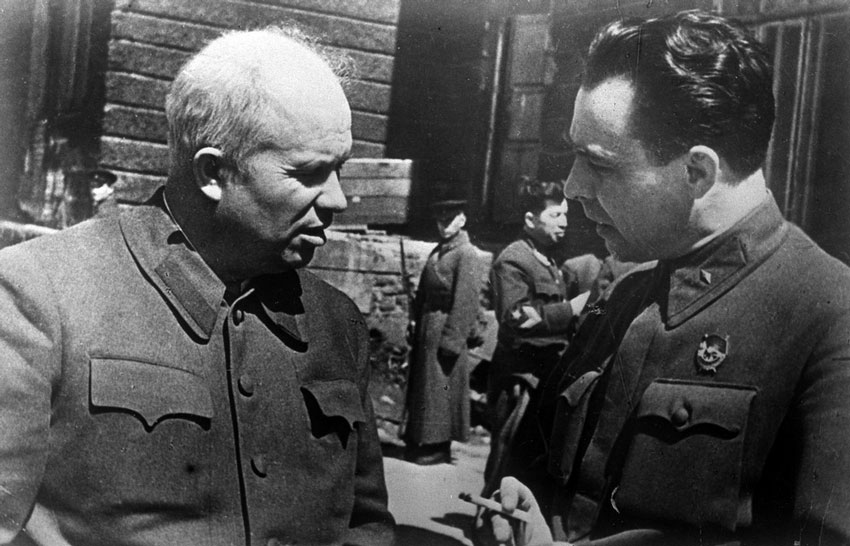
Brezhnev (right) speaks with Nikita Khrushchev, 23 April 1943

When Nazi Germany invaded the Soviet Union, Brezhnev was tasked with overseeing mobilization plans and the evacuation of Soviet factories. In July, he requested to be drafted into the military and was assigned to the Southern Front. During the retreat of Soviet forces, he returned to Dnepropetrovsk and remained in the city up to 25 August, the day it fell. In Autumn, Brezhnev was made deputy of political administration for the Southern Front, with the rank of Brigade-Commissar (equivalent to Colonel). During this period, Brezhnev developed his contacts with Khrushchev further, directly serving under his leadership from July to October 1941.

When the Germans occupied Ukraine in 1942, Brezhnev was sent to the Caucasus as deputy head of political administration of the North Caucasus Front. In April 1943, he became head of the Political Department of the 18th Army. Later that year, the 18th Army became part of the 1st Ukrainian Front, as the Red Army regained the initiative and advanced westward through Ukraine. In 1944, Brezhnev was promoted to the rank of major general as the Soviets successfully pushed German forces out of Transcarpathia. At the end of the war in Europe, Brezhnev was chief political commissar of the 4th Ukrainian Front, which entered Prague in May 1945, after the German surrender.

== Rise to power ==
=== Promotion to the Central Committee ===
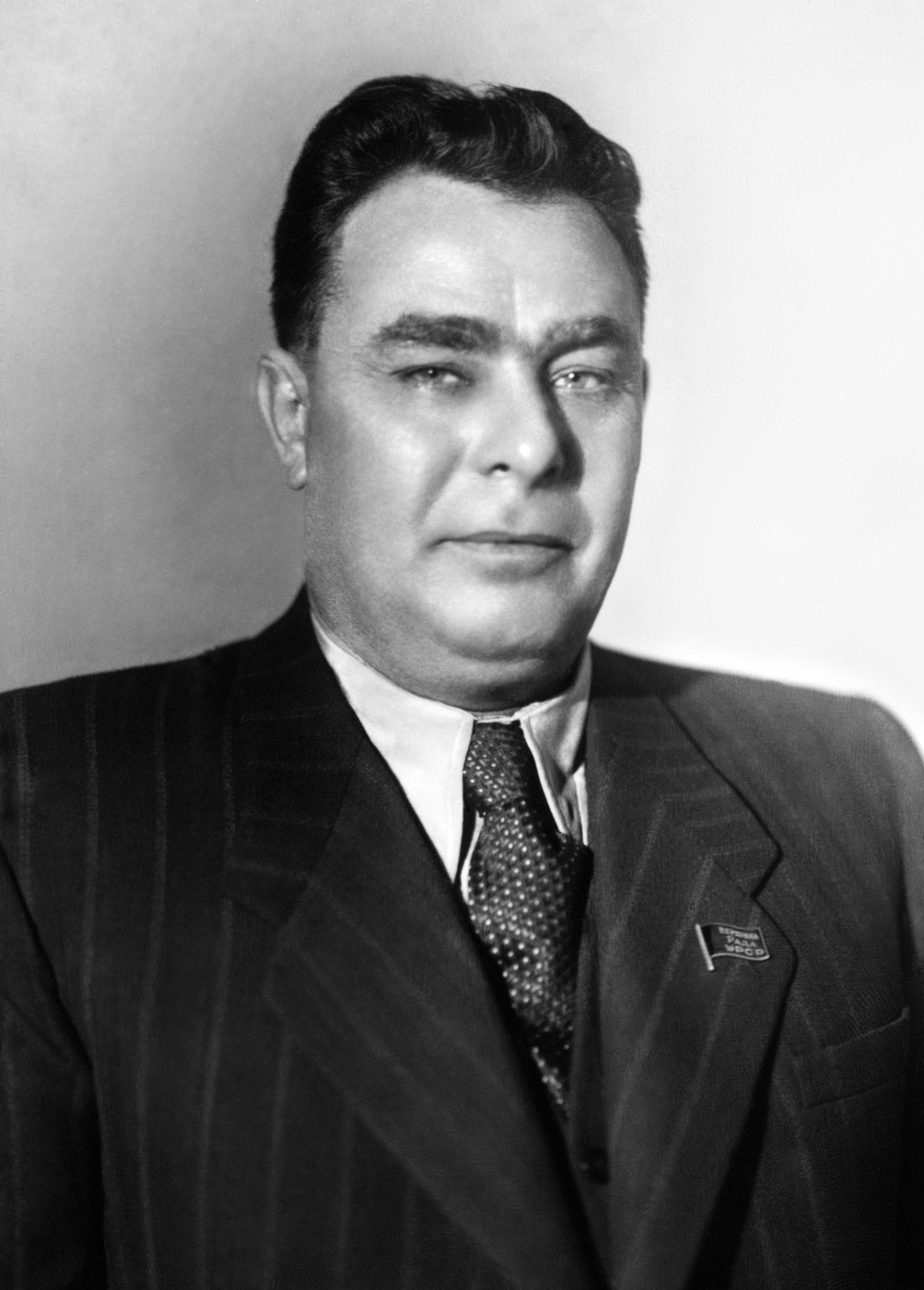
Brezhnev in 1950

At the end of the war, Brezhnev was the head of the political administration of the Carpathian Military District and oversaw the Sovietization of newly incorporated territories. He left the position in June 1946, and a few months later was appointed the first secretary of the Zaporizhzhia regional party committee, where his deputy was Andrei Kirilenko, one of the most important members of the Dnipropetrovsk Mafia. After working on reconstruction projects in Ukraine, he returned to Dnipropetrovsk in November 1947 as regional first party secretary. In 1950 Brezhnev became a deputy of the Supreme Soviet of the Soviet Union, the Soviet Union's supreme state organ of power. In July that year, he was sent to the Moldavian SSR and appointed Party First Secretary of the Communist Party of Moldova, where he was responsible for completing the introduction of collective agriculture. Konstantin Chernenko, a loyal addition to the "mafia", was working in Moldova as head of the agitprop department, and one of the officials Brezhnev brought with him from Dnipropetrovsk was the future USSR Minister of the Interior, Nikolai Shchelokov.

In 1952, Brezhnev met with Stalin who subsequently promoted him to the Communist Party's Central Committee as a candidate member of the Presidium (formerly the Politburo) and made him a member of the Secretariat. Following Stalin's death in March 1953, Brezhnev was demoted to first deputy head of the political directorate of the Army and Navy. He remained close to the main events, as he participated in the arrest of Lavrentiy Beria in June. In August, he was promoted to lieutenant general.

=== Advancement under Khrushchev ===
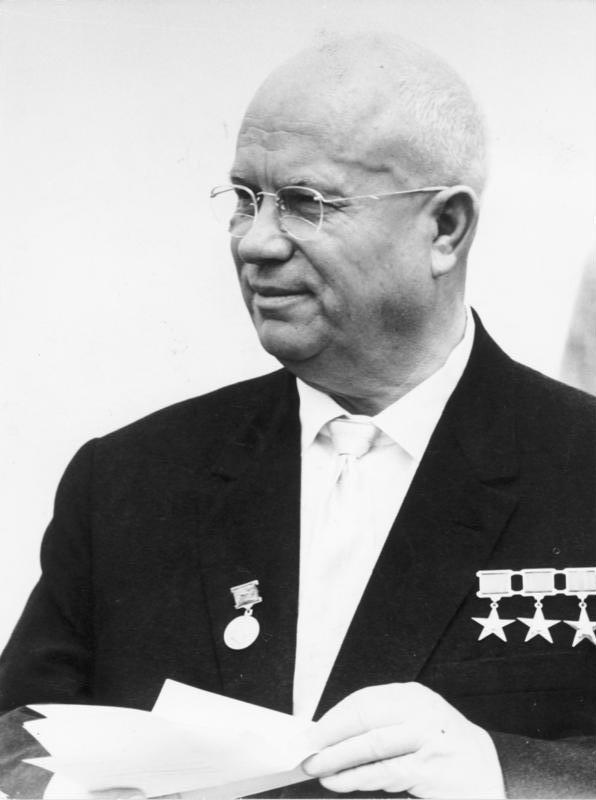
Nikita Khrushchev, the leader of the Soviet Union from 1953 to 1964 and Brezhnev's main patron

Brezhnev's patron Khrushchev succeeded Stalin as General Secretary, while Khrushchev's rival Georgy Malenkov succeeded Stalin as Chairman of the Council of Ministers. In February 1954, Brezhnev was appointed second secretary of the Communist Party of the Kazakh SSR, where he worked under Panteleimon Ponomarenko who was Malenkov's protege. Following Khrushchev's victory over Malenkov, Ponomarenko was removed in May 1955 and Brezhnev was promoted to First Secretary in August. In Kazakhstan, Brezhnev oversaw the construction of the Baikonur Cosmodrome and conducted the Virgin Lands campaign. He was recalled to Moscow in 1956, before it became clear that the campaign would turn out to be disappointing.

In Moscow, Brezhnev became a candidate member of the Politburo and was appointed secretary of Defense Industry. In this position, he oversaw the development of the Soviet missile and nuclear arms programs. In June 1957, he backed Khrushchev in his struggle with Malenkov's Stalinist old guard in the Party leadership, the so-called "Anti-Party Group". Following the Stalinists' defeat, Brezhnev became a full member of the Politburo. In May 1960, he was promoted to the post of Chairman of the Presidium of the Supreme Soviet, making him the nominal head of state, although the real power resided with Khrushchev as First Secretary of the Soviet Communist Party and Premier.

=== Replacement of Khrushchev as First Secretary ===
Khrushchev's position as Party leader was secure until about 1962, but as he aged, he grew more erratic, and his performance undermined the confidence of his fellow leaders. The Soviet Union's mounting economic problems also increased the pressure on Khrushchev's leadership. Brezhnev remained outwardly loyal to Khrushchev, but became involved in a 1963 plot to remove him from power, possibly playing a leading role. Also in 1963, Brezhnev succeeded Frol Kozlov, another Khrushchev protégé, as Secretary of the Central Committee, thereby positioning himself as Khrushchev's likely successor. Khrushchev made him Second Secretary, or deputy party leader, in 1964.

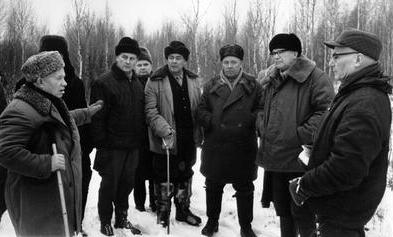
Brezhnev (center) partaking in a hunting outing with Khrushchev (far left) and Finnish president Urho Kekkonen (second from right) in 1963, one year before Khrushchev's ousting

After returning from Scandinavia and Czechoslovakia in October 1964, Khrushchev, unaware of the plot, went on holiday to the Pitsunda resort on the Black Sea. Anastas Mikoyan visited Khrushchev, hinting that he should not be too complacent about his present situation. Vladimir Semichastny, head of the KGB, was a crucial part of the conspiracy, as it was his duty to inform Khrushchev if anyone was plotting against his leadership. Nikolai Ignatov, whom Khrushchev had sacked, discreetly requested the opinion of several Central Committee members. After some false starts, fellow conspirator Mikhail Suslov phoned Khrushchev on 12 October and requested that he return to Moscow to discuss the state of Soviet agriculture. Finally, Khrushchev understood what was happening, and said to Mikoyan, "If it's me who is the question, I will not make a fight of it." Mikoyan wanted to remove Khrushchev from the office of First Secretary but retain him as the Chairman of the Council of Ministers, but the rest of the Presidium, headed by Brezhnev, wanted to remove him from active politics altogether.

Brezhnev and Suslov appealed to the Central Committee, blaming Khrushchev for economic failures, and accusing him of voluntarism and immodest behavior. Influenced by Brezhnev's allies, Politburo members voted on 14 October to remove Khrushchev from office. Some members of the Central Committee wanted him to undergo punishment of some kind, but Brezhnev, who had already been assured the office of the First Secretary, saw little reason to punish Khrushchev further. Brezhnev was appointed First Secretary on the same day, but at the time was believed to be a transitional leader, who would only "keep the shop" until another leader was appointed. Alexei Kosygin was appointed head of government, and Mikoyan was appointed head of state. Brezhnev and his companions supported the general party line taken after Stalin's death but felt that Khrushchev's reforms had removed much of the Soviet Union's stability. When Khrushchev left the public spotlight, there was no popular commotion, as most Soviet citizens, including the intelligentsia, anticipated a period of stabilization, steady development of Soviet society and continuing economic growth in the years ahead.

Political scientist George W. Breslauer has compared Khrushchev and Brezhnev as leaders. He argues they took different routes to build legitimate authority, depending on their personalities and the state of public opinion. Khrushchev worked to decentralize the government system and empower local leadership, which had been wholly subservient; Brezhnev sought to centralize authority, going so far as to weaken the roles of the other members of the Central Committee and the Politburo.

== Leader of the Soviet Union (1964–1982) ==
=== Consolidation of power ===
Other members of the governing Troika

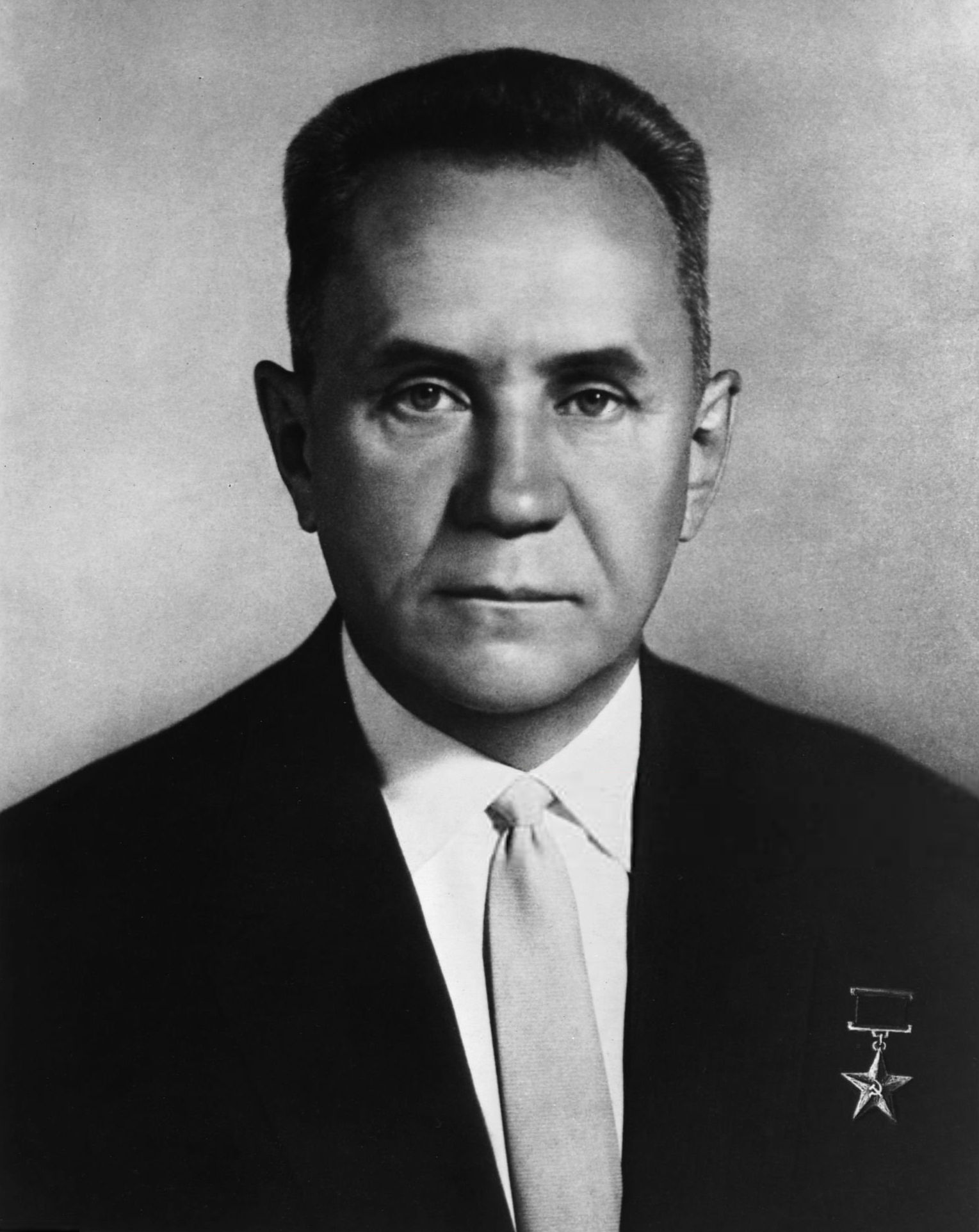
Alexei Kosygin

Nikolai Podgorny

Upon replacing Khrushchev as the party's First Secretary, Brezhnev became the de jure supreme authority of the Soviet Union. However, he was initially forced to govern as part of an unofficial Triumvirate (also known by its Russian name Troika) alongside the country's Premier, Alexei Kosygin, and Nikolai Podgorny, a Secretary of the CPSU Central Committee and later Chairman of the Presidium. Due to Khrushchev's disregard for the rest of the Politburo upon combining his leadership of the party with that of the Soviet government, a plenum of the Central Committee in October 1964 forbade any single individual from holding both the offices of General Secretary and Premier.

According to Tomas Sniegon and Nikita Pivovarov, Brezhnev ousted or demoted potential rivals, thus enabling him to consolidate power when Khrushchev was removed from power.

During his consolidation of power, Brezhnev first had to contend with the ambitions of Alexander Shelepin, the former chairman of the KGB and current head of the Party-State Control Committee. In early 1965, Shelepin began calling for the restoration of "obedience and order" within the Soviet Union as part of his own bid to seize power. Towards this end, he exploited his control over both state and party organs to leverage support within the regime. Recognizing Shelepin as an imminent threat to his position, Brezhnev mobilized the Soviet collective leadership to remove him from the Party-State Control Committee before having the body dissolved altogether on 6 December 1965.

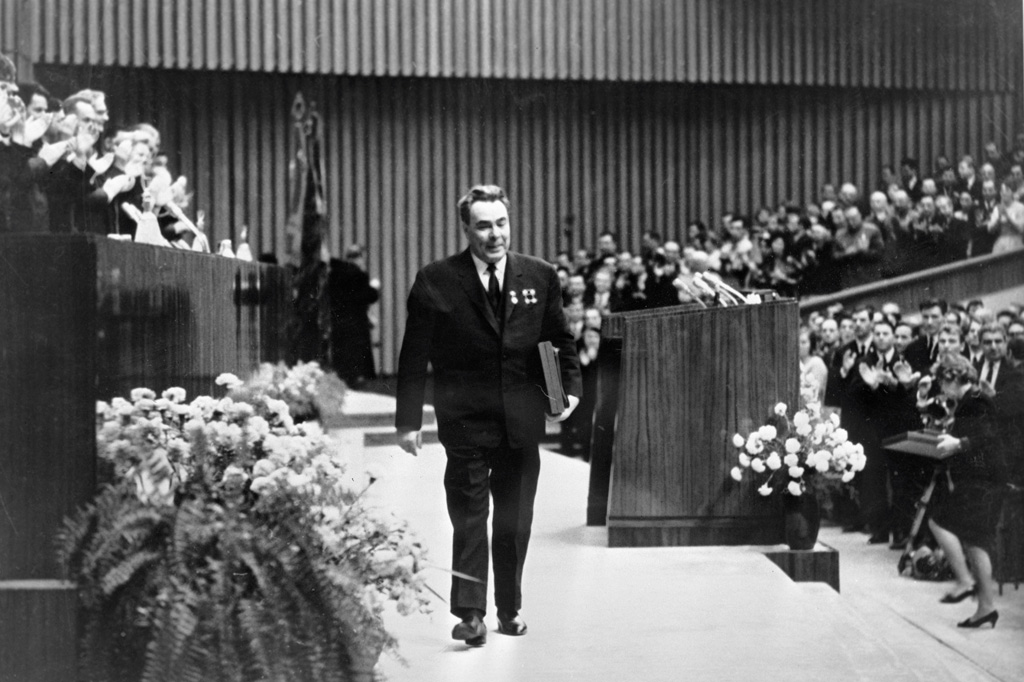
Brezhnev following a speech to the 1968 Komsomol Central Committee plenary session in his capacity as General Secretary. By then, he had reestablished the post as the top authority in both name and practice.

Additionally, by the end of 1965, Brezhnev had Podgorny removed from the Secretariat, thereby significantly curtailing the latter's ability to build support within the party apparatus. In the ensuing years, Podgorny's network of supporters was steadily eroded as the protégés he cultivated in his rise to power were removed from the Central Committee. By 1977, Brezhnev was secure enough in his position to replace Podgorny as head of state and remove him from the Politburo altogether.

After sidelining Shelepin and Podgorny as threats to his leadership in 1965, Brezhnev directed his attentions to his remaining political rival, Alexei Kosygin. In the 1960s, U.S. National Security Advisor Henry Kissinger initially perceived Kosygin to be the dominant leader of Soviet foreign policy in the Politburo. Within the same timeframe, Kosygin was also in charge of economic administration in his role as Chairman of the Council of Ministers. However, his position was weakened following his enactment of several economic reforms in 1965 that collectively came to be known within the Party as the "Kosygin reforms". Due largely to coinciding with the Prague Spring (whose sharp departure from the Soviet model led to its armed suppression in 1968), the reforms provoked a backlash among the party's old guard who proceeded to flock to Brezhnev and strengthened his position within the Soviet leadership. In 1969, Brezhnev further expanded his authority following a clash with Second Secretary Mikhail Suslov and other party officials who thereafter became firm supporters of his leadership over the Party.

Brezhnev was adept at politics within the Soviet Union. Unlike Khrushchev, he did not make decisions without consulting with his colleagues and hearing their opinions. By the early 1970s, Brezhnev had successfully consolidated his position as first among equals within the Politburo. While Kosygin continued to hold office as Premier until shortly before his death in 1980, Brezhnev's dominance over the Soviet leadership remained secure from the mid-1970s up until his eventual death in 1982.

=== Domestic policies ===
==== Ideological development ====
Ideologically, Brezhnev's rule was associated with the doctrine of Developed Socialism. This concept initially appeared in the Eastern Bloc countries during the 1960s, was rhetorically adopted by Brezhnev in 1971, took the central position at the Party Congress in 1976, and was inscribed in the Constitution the following year.

Brezhnev has defined it as the Soviet-style socialism, which he believed had been successfully constructed in the Soviet Union. It emphasized the advanced technological developments with the use of nuclear power in production, computer planning, as well as a highly mechanized agriculture. Under developed socialism all social strata within the Soviet Union were closer to each other than ever before due to the highly developed productive force in the country.

One of the main reasons behind the doctrine was an attempt to secure Soviet leadership among the Socialist bloc by presenting the USSR as a country that had reached a more advanced level of socialist development which other countries were yet to achieve. Domestically, Developed Socialism was a response to the inability to reach communism by 1980, as had been promised by Khrushchev. It entrenched Party rule and promoted conservativism and caution by focusing on gradual change.

==== Repression ====
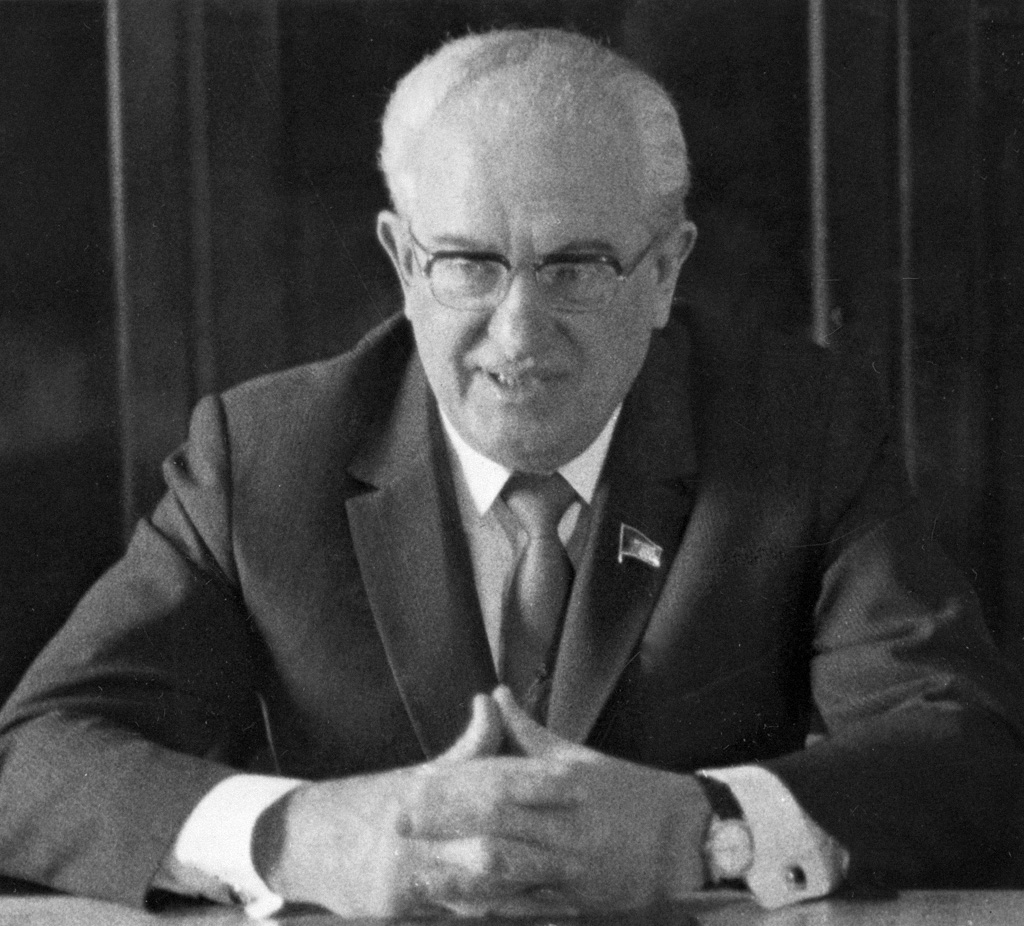
Yuri Andropov, the chairman of the KGB who presided over the pervasive crackdown under Brezhnev's regime

Brezhnev's stabilization policy included ending the liberalizing reforms of Khrushchev, and clamping down on cultural freedom. This policy gradually led to an increasingly authoritarian and conservative attitude.

By the mid-1970s, there were an estimated 10,000 political and religious prisoners across the Soviet Union, living in grievous conditions and suffering from malnutrition. Many of these prisoners were considered by the Soviet state to be mentally unfit and were hospitalized in mental asylums across the Soviet Union. Under Brezhnev's rule, the KGB infiltrated most, if not all, anti-government organisations, which ensured that there was little to no opposition against him or his power base.

The trial of the writers Yuli Daniel and Andrei Sinyavsky in 1966, the first such public trials since Stalin's reign, marked the reversion to a repressive cultural policy. Under Yuri Andropov the state security service (in the form of the KGB) regained some of the powers it had enjoyed under Stalin. However, there was no return to the purges of the 1930s and 1940s, and Stalin's legacy remained largely discredited among the Soviet intelligentsia.

==== Economics ====
===== Economic growth until 1973 =====
Period	Annual GNP growth (according to the CIA)	Annual NMP growth (according to Grigorii Khanin)	Annual NMP growth (according to the USSR)
1960–1965	4.8	4.4	6.5
1965–1970	4.9	4.1	7.7
1970–1975	3.0	3.2	5.7
1975–1980	1.9	1.0	4.2
1980–1985	1.8	0.6	3.5
(Note: Western specialists believe that the net material product (NMP; Soviet version of gross national product [GNP]) contained distortions and could not accurately determine a country's economic growth; according to some, it greatly exaggerated growth. Because of this, several specialists created GNP figures to estimate Soviet growth rates and to compare Soviet growth rates with the growth rates of capitalist countries. Grigorii Khanin published his growth rates in the 1980s as a "translation" of NMP to GNP. His growth rates were (as seen above) much lower than the official figures, and lower than some Western estimates. His estimates were widely publicized by conservative think tanks as, for instance, The Heritage Foundation of Washington, D.C. After the dissolution of the Soviet Union in 1991, Khanin's estimates led several agencies to criticize the estimates made by the Central Intelligence Agency (CIA). Since then the CIA has often been accused over overestimating Soviet growth. In response to the criticism of CIA's work, a panel led by economist James R. Millar was established to check out if this was in fact true. The panel concluded that the CIA were based on facts, and that "Methodologically, Khanin's approach was naive, and it has not been possible for others to reproduce his results." Michael Boretsky, a Department of Commerce economist, criticized the CIA estimates to be too low. He used the same CIA methodology to estimate West German and American growth rates. The results were 32% below the official GNP growth for West Germany, and 13 below the official GNP growth for the United States. In the end, the conclusion is the same, the Soviet Union grew rapidly economically until the mid-1970s, when a systematic crisis began. Growth figures for the Soviet economy varies widely (as seen below): Eighth Five-Year Plan (1966–1970): Gross national product (GNP): 5.2% or 5.3%; Gross national income (GNI): 7.1%; Capital investments in agriculture: 24%; Ninth Five-Year Plan (1971–1975): GNP: 3.7%; GNI: 5.1%; Labour productivity: 6%; Capital investments in agriculture: 27%; Tenth Five-Year Plan (1976–1980): GNP: 2.7%; GNP: 3%; Labour productivity: 3.2%; Eleventh Five-Year Plan (1981–1985))

Between 1960 and 1970, Soviet agriculture output increased by 3% annually. Industry also improved: during the Eighth Five-Year Plan (1966–1970), the output of factories and mines increased by 138% compared to 1960. The economic reform of 1965 was initiated by Kosygin, though its origins are often traced back to the Khrushchev Era. The reform introduced market principles to Soviet enterprises to reduce their dependence on plan indicators. It was ultimately cancelled by the Central Committee, though the Committee admitted that economic problems did exist

Under Brezhnev, the Politburo abandoned Khrushchev's decentralization experiments. By 1966, two years after taking power, Brezhnev abolished the Regional Economic Councils, which were organized to manage the regional economies of the Soviet Union. The Politburo became aggressively anti-reformist and the Soviet Union could not afford to maintain its massive subsidy for the Eastern Bloc in the form of cheap oil and gas exports. Brezhnev attempted to raise the standard of living by increasing the production of consumer goods during the Ninth Five-Year Plan, but it was ultimately unsuccessful, and the bulk of the state investment remained in industrial capital-goods production.

By the early 1970s, the Soviet Union had the world's second largest industrial capacity, and produced more steel, oil, pig-iron, cement and tractors than any other country. Before 1973, the Soviet economy was expanding at a faster rate than that of the American economy (albeit by a very small margin). The USSR also kept a steady pace with the economies of Western Europe. Between 1964 and 1973, the Soviet economy stood at roughly half the output per head of Western Europe and a little more than one third that of the U.S. In 1973, the process of catching up with the rest of the West came to an end and the Era of Stagnation was apparent.

===== Economic stagnation until 1982 =====
The Era of Stagnation is a term coined by Mikhail Gorbachev to describe the time when Brezhnev was in power and his inability to deal with changing times. The CIA estimated that the Soviet economy peaked in the early 1970s. After that, economic growth began to slow down due to the prioritization of heavy industry and military spending over consumer goods. The social stagnation was stimulated by the growing demands of unskilled workers, labor shortages and a decline in productivity and labor discipline.

The GNP growth rate fell to 1% to 2% per year, falling behind the rate for the United States. The Soviet Union outproduced the U.S. in heavy industry, but due to the cumbersome procedures of the centralized planning system, Soviet industries were incapable of the innovation needed to meet public demand. The Soviets had almost no access to microcomputers, and the availability of cars and phones per capita was lower than in its Eastern satellites. This gap was also seen in agriculture, where the Soviet Union was import-dependent. In 1978, all satellites surpassed the Soviet Union in meat and egg production per capita, and Hungary produced more wheat.

In 1971, Brezhnev acknowledged that vast military expenditure slowed the growth of the Soviet economy. However, he was able to defer economic collapse by selling oil to Western Europe and arms to the Arab World.

==== Agricultural policy ====
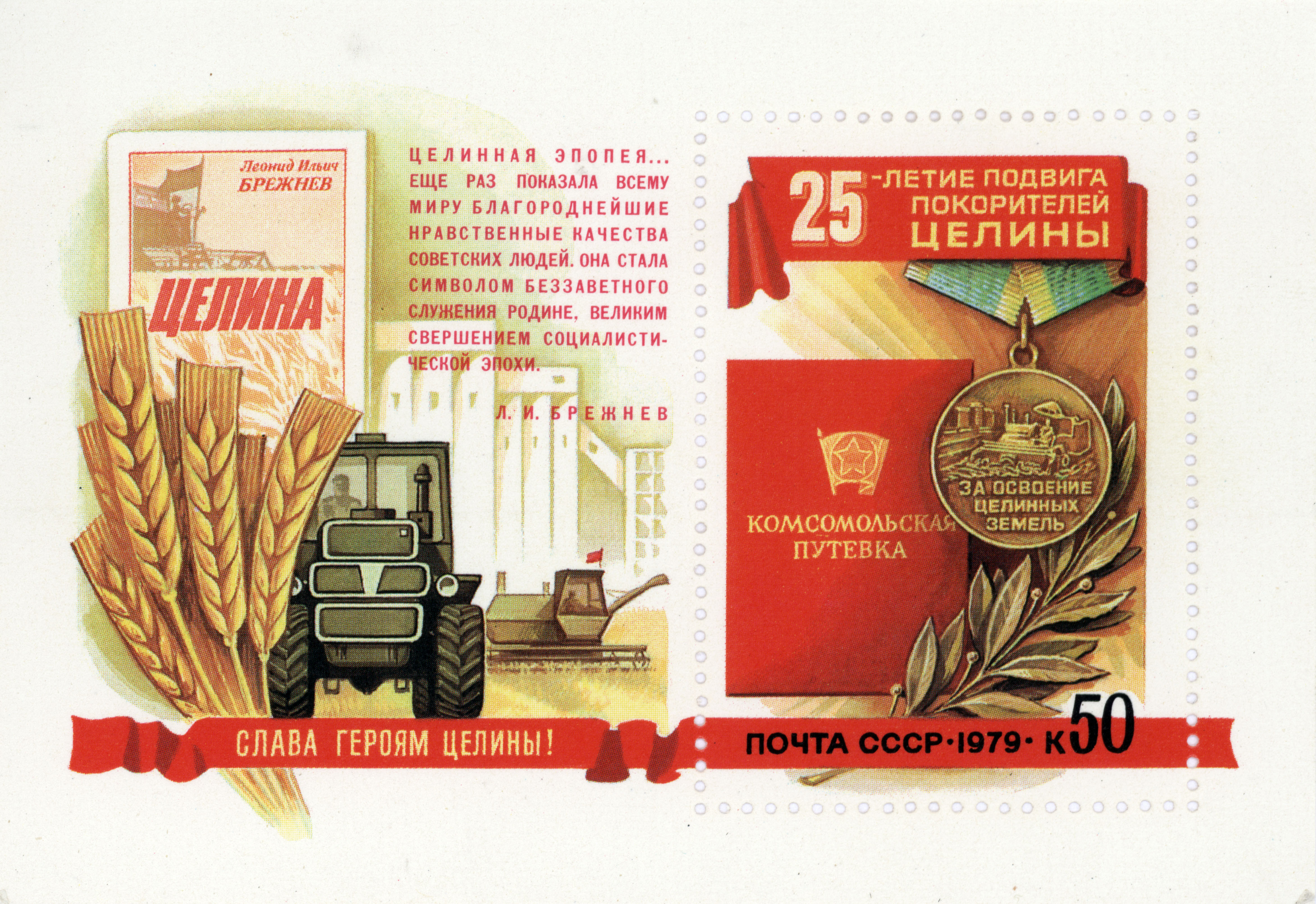
USSR postage stamp of 1979, celebrating the 25th anniversary of the Virgin Lands Campaign

Brezhnev's agricultural policy reinforced conventional methods for organizing the collective farms. Output quotas continued to be imposed centrally. Brezhnev also continued Khrushchev's policy of amalgamating farms. In order to address problems such as insufficient production of fodder crops and a declining sugar beet harvest, he allowed the enlargement of privately owned plots and pushed for an increase in state investments in farming, which amounted to an all-time high in the 1970s of 27% of all state investment.

Robert Service characterized the Soviet government's involvement in agriculture under Brezhnev as generally "unimaginative" and "incompetent". Since Khrushchev's rule, the import of cereal had become a staple of Soviet policy. When Brezhnev had difficulty sealing commercial trade agreements with the United States, he turned to other countries such as Argentina. In 1976, the Politburo issued a resolution that ordered kolkhozes close to each other to collaborate in their efforts to increase production. In the meantime, the state's subsidies to the food-and-agriculture sector did not prevent bankrupt farms from operating at a loss as rises in the price of produce were offset by the increased cost of fuel and other resources.

Brezhnev's call for an increase in the maximum size of privately owned plots within the Soviet Union removed important obstacles for the expansion of agricultural output but did not solve underlying problems. These included the growing shortage of skilled workers, the payment of workers in proportion to the quantity rather than quality of their work, and farm machinery that was too large for small collective farms and the roadless countryside. Under Brezhnev, private plots yielded 30% of the national agricultural production when they cultivated only 4% of the land. This was seen by some as proof that de-collectivization was necessary to prevent Soviet agriculture from collapsing, but leading Soviet politicians shrank from supporting such drastic measures due to ideological and political interests.

==== Society ====
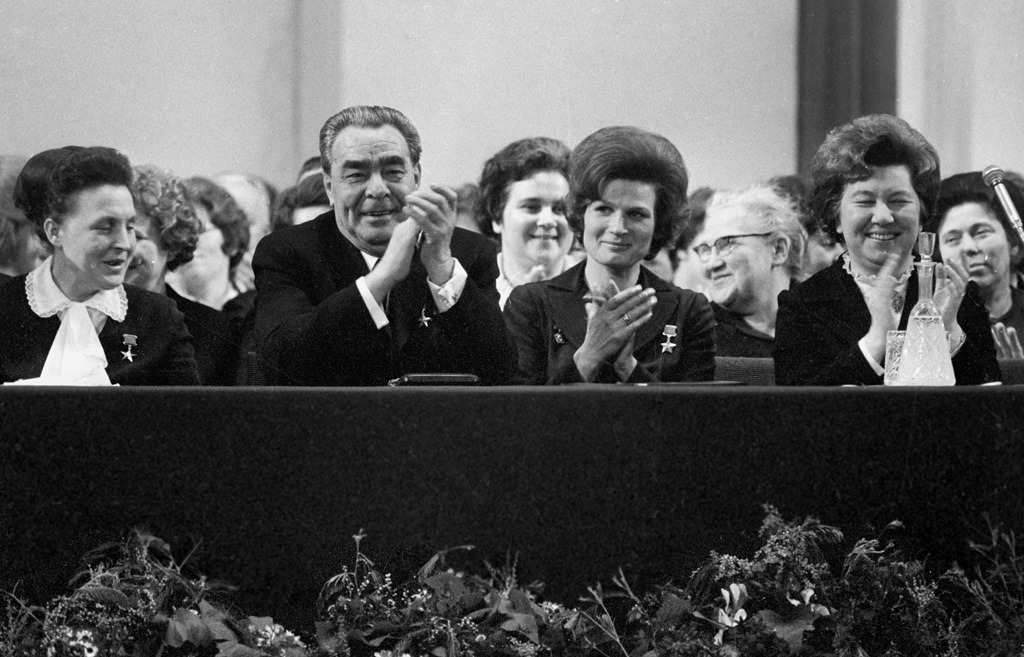
Brezhnev at International Women's Day celebrations, 1973

Over the eighteen years that Brezhnev ruled the Soviet Union, average income per head increased by half, slightly less growth than what it had been the previous years; three-quarters of this growth came in the 1960s and early 1970s. This can be explained by the end of the post-war recovery. Consumption per head rose by an estimated 70% under Brezhnev. Most of the increase in consumer production in the early Brezhnev era can be attributed to the Kosygin reform.

When the Soviet Union's economic growth stalled in the 1970s, the standard of living and housing quality improved significantly. The Soviet leadership under Brezhnev tried to improve the living standard in the Soviet Union by extending social benefits. Despite some improvements, the situation for ordinary Russians remained bad. Alcoholism, suicide, mental illness and divorce were on the rise. The living space remained rather small, with the average Soviet person living on 13.4 square metres. The standard of living in the Russian SFSR was lower than that of the Estonian or Georgian SSRs, a disparity that led to resentment among Russians.

Although difficulties in the Soviet economy became apparent as early as the late 1960s, the population’s living conditions continued to improve. The majority of the population earned what it considered an acceptable wage and lived in decent apartments. The state provided education, medical care, housing, and paid leave free of charge. Most families also had free access to daycare and after-school activities. Full employment, generous and free disability insurance, and the lowering of the retirement age with full benefits (55 for women and 60 for men) all contributed to an improvement in living standards.

Government industries such as factories, mines and offices were staffed by undisciplined personnel, this ultimately led, according to Robert Service, to a "work-shy workforce". The Soviet Government had no effective counter-measure, because of the country's lack of unemployment. The state provided recreation facilities and annual holidays for hard-working citizens.

In Brezhnev's Soviet Union, social rigidity became a common feature of Soviet society. Within the country's workforce, incompetence alone was not treated as a sufficient cause for dismissal. Consequently, those holding management positions were able to occupy them indefinitely regardless of the quality of their performance, thereby reducing advancement opportunities for those below them.

=== Foreign and defense policies ===
==== Invasion of Czechoslovakia ====
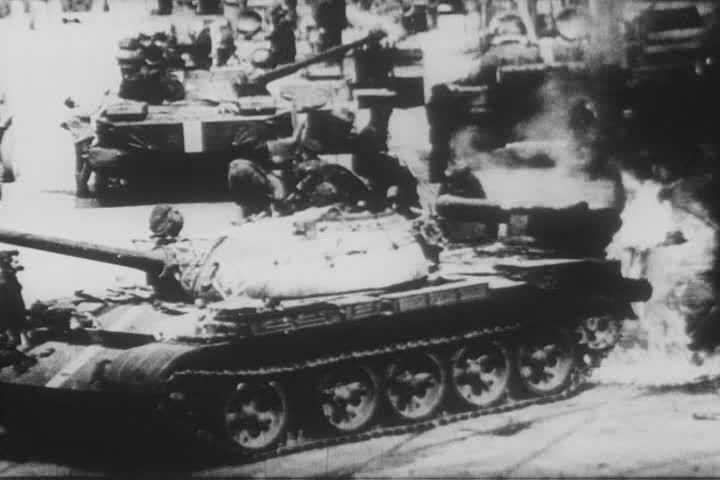
A Soviet T-55 tank catches fire while battling Czech protesters during the 1968 invasion of Czechoslovakia.

The first crisis for Brezhnev's regime came in 1968, with the attempt by the Communist leadership in Czechoslovakia, under Alexander Dubček, to liberalize the Communist system (Prague Spring). In July, Brezhnev publicly denounced the Czechoslovak leadership as "revisionist" and "anti-Soviet". Despite his hardline public statements, Brezhnev was not the one pushing hardest for the use of military force in Czechoslovakia when the issue was before the Politburo. Archival evidence suggests that Brezhnev initially sought a temporary compromise with the reform-friendly Czechoslovak government when their dispute came to a head. However, in the end, Brezhnev concluded that he would risk growing turmoil domestically and within the Eastern bloc if he abstained or voted against Soviet intervention in Czechoslovakia.

As pressure mounted on him within the Soviet leadership to "re-install a revolutionary government" within Prague, Brezhnev ordered the Warsaw Pact invasion of Czechoslovakia, and Dubček's removal in August. Following the Soviet intervention, he met with Czechoslovak reformer Bohumil Šimon (politik KSČ), then a member of the Politburo of the Czechoslovak Communist Party, and said, "If I had not voted for Soviet armed assistance to Czechoslovakia you would not be sitting here today, but quite possibly I wouldn't either." The invasion led to a drop in the belief in the Communist system among Czechoslovaks and prompted a rise of Eurocommunism, which was critical of the Soviet Union.

==== Vietnam War ====
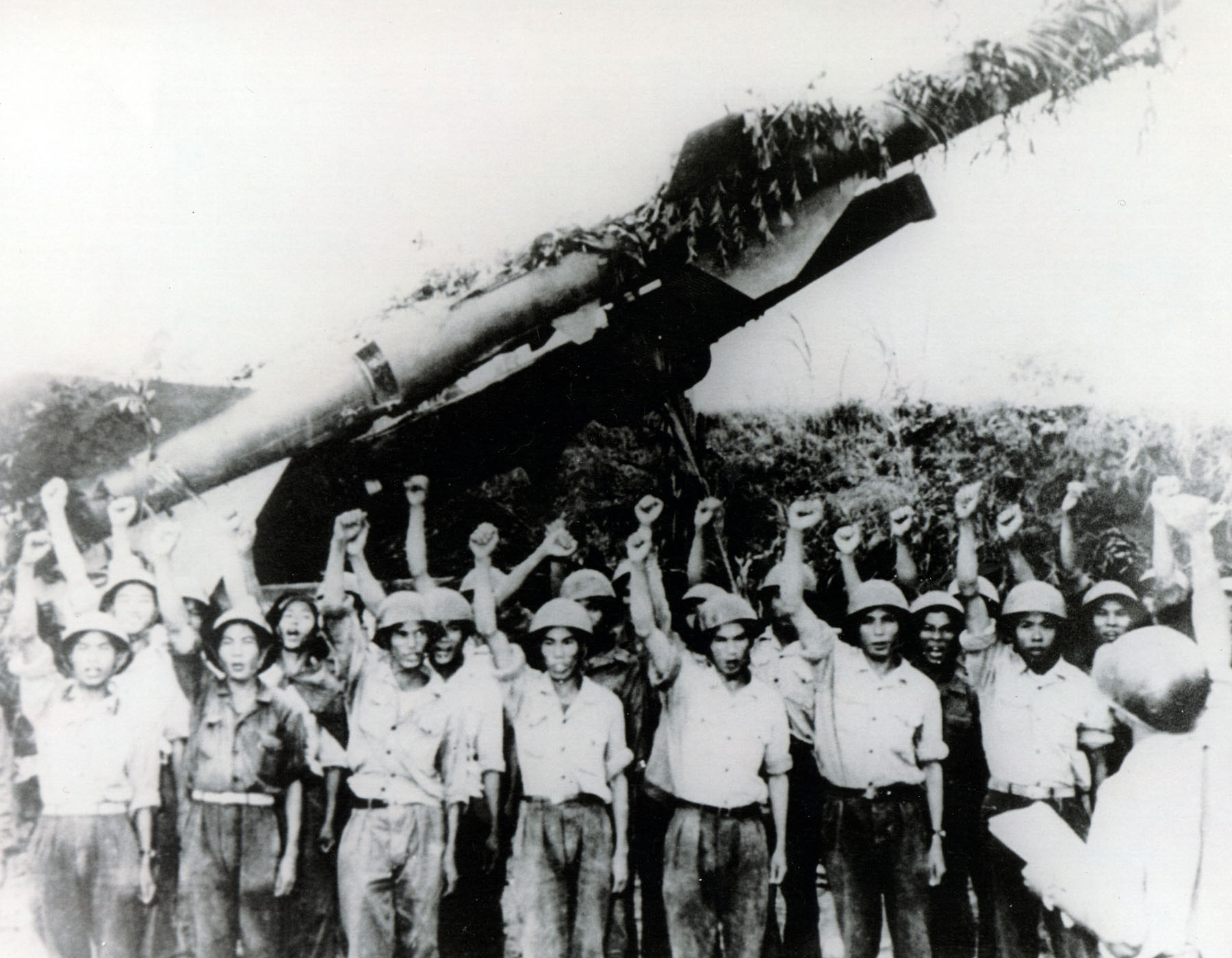
North Vietnamese troops pose in front of a Soviet S-75 missile launcher.

Under Khrushchev, the Soviet Union initially supported North Vietnam out of "fraternal solidarity". However, as the war escalated, Khrushchev urged the North Vietnamese leadership to give up the quest of liberating South Vietnam. After Khrushchev's ousting, Brezhnev resumed aiding the communist resistance in Vietnam. Under Brezhnev's leadership, the Soviet Union would ultimately ship $450 million worth of arms annually to North Vietnam over the course of the war.

The Lyndon B. Johnson administration privately discussed a diplomatic end to the conflict with the Soviets. Once that failed due to North Vietnamese rejection, they pursued a treaty on arms control, which did not materialize because of infighting in the Kremlin and the escalation of the war. Further attempts at reconciliation led to the Glassboro Summit Conference in the U.S., which, despite a friendly atmosphere, did not lead to any breakthroughs. U.S. President Richard Nixon visited Moscow in 1972 to, among other things, negotiate on the Vietnam War, but nothing was agreed upon. Ultimately, years of Soviet military aid to North Vietnam finally bore fruit when collapsing morale among U.S. forces compelled their complete withdrawal from South Vietnam by 1973, thereby making way for the country's unification under communist rule two years later.

==== Sino–Soviet relations ====
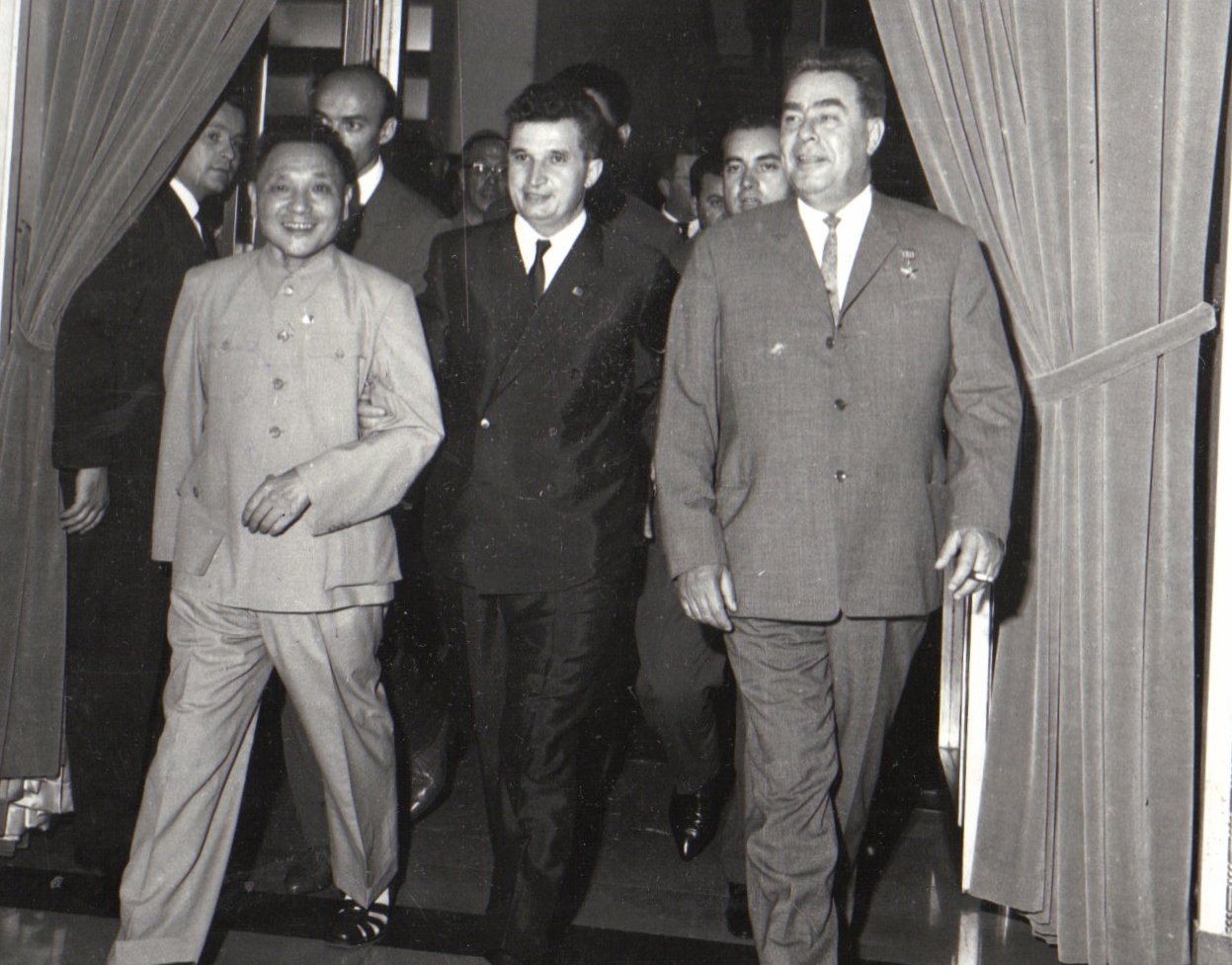
Deng Xiaoping (left) and Brezhnev (right) with Nicolae Ceaușescu in Bucharest, 1965

Soviet foreign relations with the People's Republic of China quickly deteriorated after Nikita Khrushchev's attempts to reach a rapprochement with more liberal Eastern European states such as Yugoslavia and with the West. When Brezhnev consolidated his power base in the 1960s, China was descending into crisis because of Mao Zedong's Cultural Revolution, which led to the decimation of the Chinese Communist Party and other ruling offices. Brezhnev, a pragmatic politician who promoted the idea of "stabilization", could not comprehend why Mao would start such a "self-destructive" drive to finish the socialist revolution.

In the aftermath of the Soviet invasion of Czechoslovakia, the Soviet leadership proclaimed the Brezhnev Doctrine: any threat to "socialist rule" in any state of the Soviet Bloc was a threat to all of them, and would justify the intervention. This new policy increased tension not only with the Eastern Bloc, but also the Asian communist states. By 1969, relations with other communist countries had deteriorated to a level where Brezhnev was not even able to gather five of the fourteen ruling communist parties to attend an international conference in Moscow. In the aftermath of the failed conference, the Soviets concluded, "there was no leading center of the international communist movement." Soviet leader Mikhail Gorbachev repudiated the Brezhnev Doctrine in the late 1980s, as the Kremlin accepted the peaceful overthrow of Soviet rule in all its satellite countries in Eastern Europe.

Later in 1969, the deterioration in bilateral relations culminated in the Sino–Soviet border conflict. The Sino–Soviet split had chagrined Premier Alexei Kosygin a great deal, and for a while he refused to accept its irrevocability; he briefly visited Beijing in 1969 in an effort to ease the tension between the USSR and China. By the early 1980s, both the Chinese and the Soviets were issuing statements calling for a normalization of relations between the two states. The conditions given to the Soviets by the Chinese were the reduction of Soviet military presence on the Sino–Soviet border, the withdrawal of Soviet troops in Afghanistan and the Mongolian People's Republic; furthermore, China also wanted the Soviets to end their support for the Vietnamese invasion of Cambodia. Brezhnev responded in his March 1982 speech in Tashkent where he called for the normalization of relations. Full Sino–Soviet normalization of relations would take years, until the last Soviet ruler, Mikhail Gorbachev, came to power.

==== Soviet–U.S. relations ====
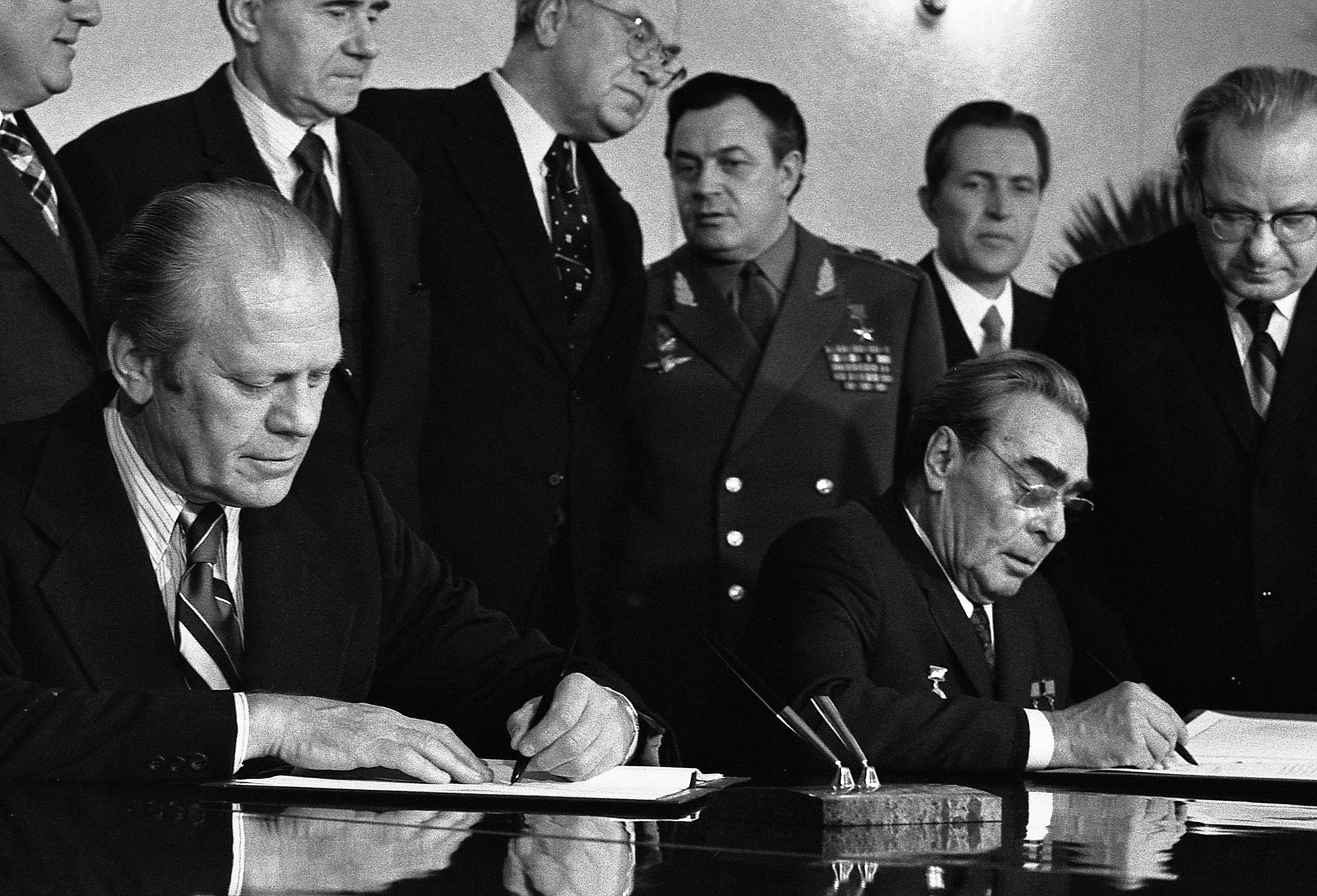
Brezhnev (seated right) and U.S. President Gerald Ford signing a joint communiqué on the SALT treaty in Vladivostok

During his eighteen years as Leader of the USSR, Brezhnev's signature foreign policy innovation was the promotion of détente. According to Melvyn P. Leffler, Brezhnev’s geopolitical vision was shaped by his memories of the Second World War which led him to remain anxious about a war of such scale breaking out once more. In 1974, he confided to U.S. President Gerald Ford that he did not want to ‘inflict that on the people once again.’.’

While sharing some similarities with approaches pursued during the Khrushchev Thaw, Brezhnev's policy significantly differed from Khrushchev's precedent in two ways. The first was that it was more comprehensive and wide-ranging in its aims, and included signing agreements on arms control, crisis prevention, East–West trade, European security and human rights. The second part of the policy was based on the importance of equalizing the military strength of the United States and the Soviet Union. Defense spending under Brezhnev between 1965 and 1970 increased by 40%, and annual increases continued thereafter. In the year of Brezhnev's death in 1982, 12% of GNP was spent on the military. This build up led numerous observers – including Western ones – to argue that by the mid-1970s the USSR had surpassed the United States as the world's strongest military power.

At the 1972 Moscow Summit, Brezhnev and U.S. president Richard Nixon signed the SALT I Treaty. The first part of the agreement set limits on each side's development of nuclear missiles. The second part of the agreement, the Anti-Ballistic Missile Treaty, banned both countries from designing systems to intercept incoming missiles so neither the U.S. or the Soviet Union would be emboldened to strike the other without fear of nuclear retaliation.

In 1979, Henry Kissinger acknowledged that his policy of détente was faltering by the mid-1970s. The détente had rested on the assumption that a "linkage" of some type could be found between the two countries, with the U.S. hoping that the signing of SALT I and an increase in Soviet–U.S. trade would stop the aggressive growth of communism in the third world. This did not happen, as evidenced by Brezhnev's continued military support for the communist guerillas fighting against the U.S. during the Vietnam War.

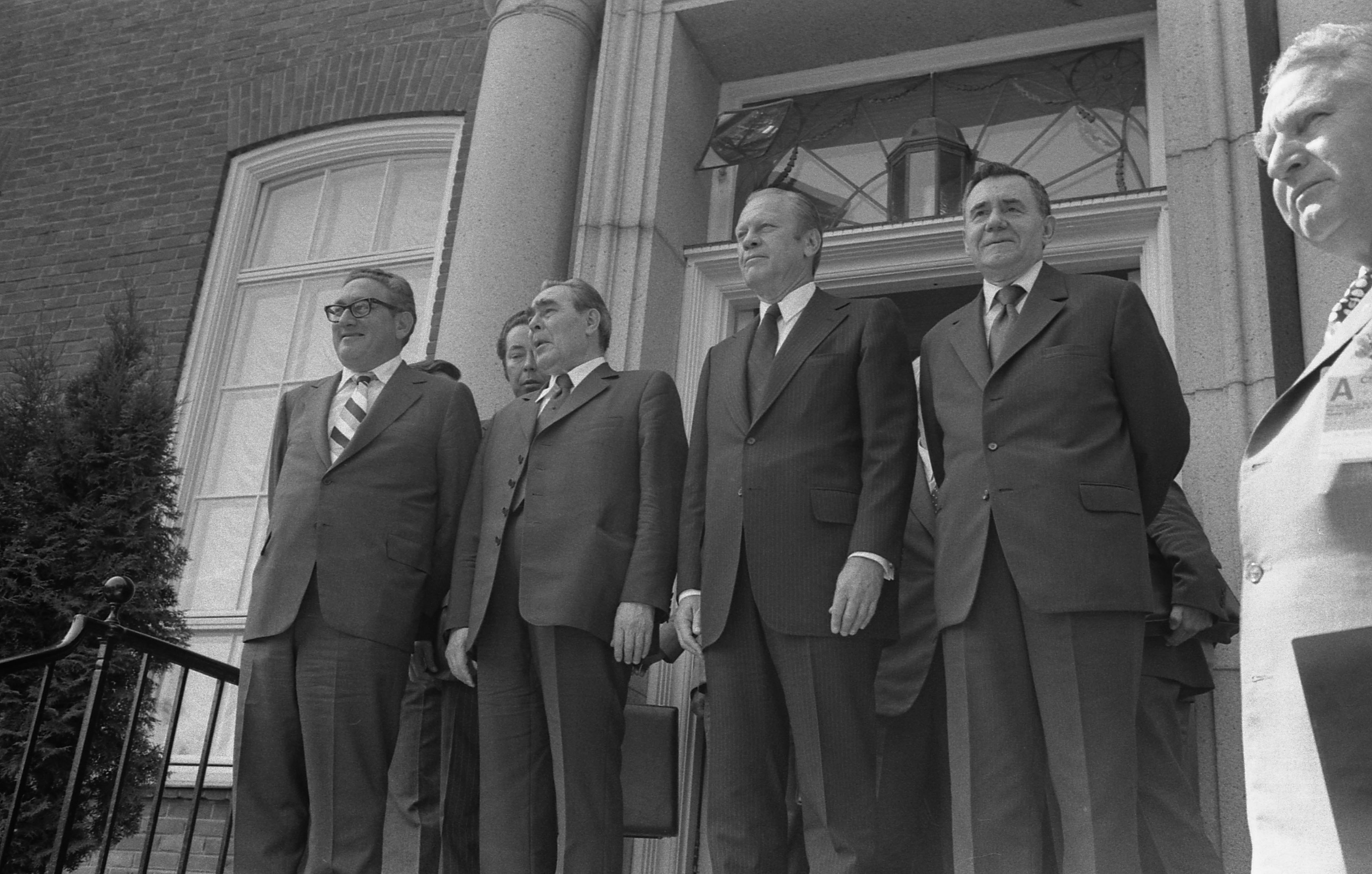
Brezhnev (second from left in front row) poses for the press in 1975 during negotiations for the Helsinki Accords.

After Gerald Ford lost the presidential election to Jimmy Carter, American foreign policies became more overtly aggressive in vocabulary towards the Soviet Union and the communist world. Attempts were also made to stop funding for repressive anti-communist governments and organizations the United States supported. While at first standing for a decrease in all defense initiatives, the later years of Carter's presidency would increase spending on the U.S. military. When Brezhnev authorized the Soviet invasion of Afghanistan in 1979, Carter, following the advice of his National Security Adviser Zbigniew Brzezinski, denounced the intervention, describing it as the "most serious danger to peace since 1945". The U.S. stopped all grain exports to the Soviet Union and boycotted the 1980 Summer Olympics held in Moscow. The Soviet Union responded by boycotting the 1984 Summer Olympics held in Los Angeles.

During Brezhnev's rule, the Soviet Union reached the peak of its political and strategic power in relation to the United States. As a result of the limits agreed to by both superpowers in the first SALT Treaty, the Soviet Union obtained parity in nuclear weapons with the United States for the first time in the Cold War. Additionally, as a result of negotiations during the Helsinki Accords, Brezhnev succeeded in securing the legitimization of Soviet hegemony over Central and Eastern Europe.

==== Intervention in Afghanistan ====
After the communist revolution in Afghanistan in 1978, authoritarian actions forced upon the populace by the Communist regime led to the Afghan civil war, with the mujahideen leading the popular backlash against the regime. To stabilize the situation, Afghanistan's leader Nur Muhammad Taraki visited Moscow and asked for a military intervention in March 1979. Brezhnev was against it and was ready only to send an additional 500 civilian and military specialists, doubling the current number. Taraki visited Moscow again in September, where Brezhnev cautioned him that his confrontation with another Afghanistan leader, Hafizullah Amin, could damage the revolutionary cause and urged for a reconciliation. Shortly after that, Taraki was assassinated on Amin's order. This, together with the Soviet desire to assert its influence in Central Asia, were the factors that led the Soviet Union to intervene.

The decision to invade Afghanistan was taken unanimously in December 1979 by the Politburo leadership, an unsubstantiated KGB report that Amin was a CIA agent was used as a justification. German historian Susanne Schattenberg writes that Brezhnev was no longer in charge of foreign policy due to his deteriorating health condition, allowing other members of the Politburo to lead him. The operation was expected to be swift and generate little opposition from the USA. The initial invasion was successful, and in February 1980, the Soviets started to consider withdrawal, with Brezhnev agreeing that it would take a year or two. Ultimately, the war dragged on far longer, lasting nearly a decade and involving hundreds of thousands of troops.

==== Brezhnev Doctrine ====
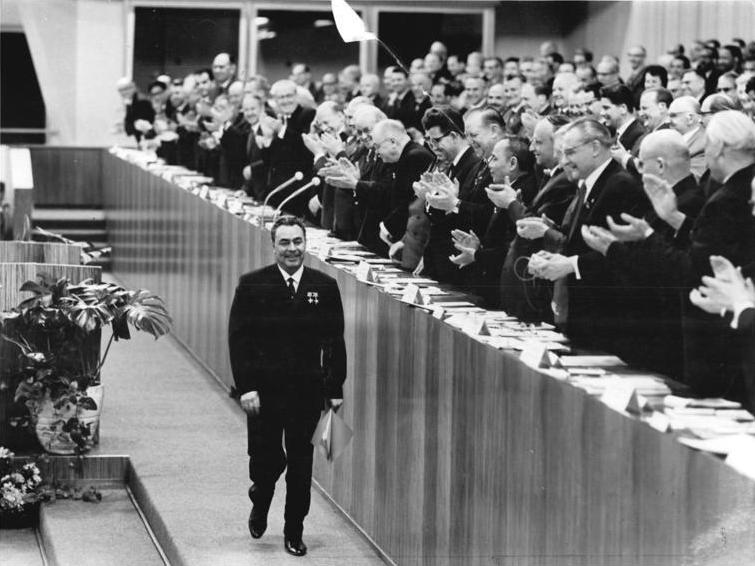
Brezhnev at a Party congress in East Berlin in 1967

In the aftermath of the Prague Spring's suppression, Brezhnev announced that the Soviet Union had the right to interfere in the internal affairs of its satellites to "safeguard socialism". This became known as the Brezhnev Doctrine, although it was really a restatement of existing Soviet policy, as enacted by Khrushchev in Hungary in 1956. Brezhnev reiterated the doctrine in a speech at the Fifth Congress of the Polish United Workers' Party on 13 November 1968:

When forces that are hostile to socialism try to turn the development of some socialist country towards capitalism, it becomes not only a problem of the country concerned, but a common problem and concern of all socialist countries.

— Brezhnev, Speech to the Fifth Congress of the Polish United Workers' Party in November 1968

Later in 1980, a political crisis emerged in Poland with the emergence of the Solidarity movement. By the end of October, Solidarity had 3 million members, and by December, had 9 million. In a public opinion poll organised by the Polish government, 89% of the respondents supported Solidarity. With the Polish leadership split on what to do, the majority did not want to impose martial law, as suggested by Wojciech Jaruzelski. The Soviet Union and other states of the Eastern Bloc were unsure how to handle the situation, but Erich Honecker of East Germany pressed for military action. In a formal letter to Brezhnev, Honecker proposed a joint military measure to control the escalating problems in Poland. A CIA report suggested the Soviet military were mobilizing for an invasion.

In 1980–81 representatives from the Eastern Bloc nations met at the Kremlin to discuss the Polish situation. Brezhnev eventually concluded on 10 December 1981 that it would be better to leave the domestic matters of Poland alone, reassuring the Polish delegates that the USSR would intervene only if asked to. This effectively marked the end of the Brezhnev Doctrine. Notwithstanding the absence of a Soviet military intervention, Wojciech Jaruzelski ultimately gave in to Moscow's demands by imposing a state of war, the Polish version of martial law, on 13 December 1981.

=== Cult of personality ===
Soviet souvenir sheet commemorating Brezhnev's enactment of the 1977 Soviet Constitution.

The last years of Brezhnev's rule were marked by a growing personality cult. His love of medals (he received over 100) was well known, so in December 1966, on his 60th birthday, he was awarded the Hero of the Soviet Union. Brezhnev received the award, which came with the Order of Lenin and the Gold Star, three more times in celebration of his birthdays. On his 70th birthday he was awarded the rank of Marshal of the Soviet Union, the Soviet Union's highest military honour. After being awarded the rank, he attended an 18th Army Veterans meeting, dressed in a long coat and saying "Attention, the Marshal is coming!" He also conferred upon himself the rare Order of Victory in 1978, which was posthumously revoked in 1989 for not meeting the criteria for citation. A promotion to the rank of Generalissimo of the Soviet Union, planned for Brezhnev's seventy-fifth birthday, was quietly shelved due to his ongoing health problems.

Brezhnev's eagerness for undeserved glory was shown by his memoirs recalling his military service during World War II, which treated the minor battles near Novorossiysk as a decisive military theatre. Despite his book's apparent weaknesses, it was awarded the Lenin Prize for Literature and was hailed by the Soviet press. The book was followed by two other books, one on the Virgin Lands campaign.

=== Health problems ===
Brezhnev's personality cult was growing at a time when his health was in rapid decline. His physical condition was deteriorating; he had been a heavy smoker until the 1970s, had become addicted to sleeping pills and tranquilizers. Over the years Brezhnev had become overweight. From 1973 until his death, his central nervous system underwent chronic deterioration and he had several minor strokes as well as insomnia. In 1975 he suffered his first heart attack. When receiving the Order of Lenin, Brezhnev walked shakily and fumbled his words. According to one American intelligence expert, United States officials knew for several years that Brezhnev had suffered from severe arteriosclerosis and believed he had suffered from other unspecified ailments as well. In 1977, American intelligence officials publicly suggested that Brezhnev had also been suffering from gout, leukemia and emphysema from decades of heavy smoking, as well as chronic bronchitis.

Upon suffering a stroke in 1975, Brezhnev's ability to lead the Soviet Union was significantly compromised. As his ability to define Soviet foreign policy weakened, he increasingly deferred to the opinions of a hardline brain trust comprising KGB Chairman Yuri Andropov, longtime foreign minister Andrei Gromyko, and Defense Minister Andrei Grechko (who was succeeded by Dmitriy Ustinov in 1976).

The Ministry of Health kept doctors by Brezhnev's side at all times, and he was brought back from near death on several occasions. The most notable instance was in 1976, when Brezhnev suffered a near-fatal stroke that left him clinically dead before the doctors were able to resuscitate him. At this time, most senior officers of the CPSU wanted to keep Brezhnev alive. Even though an increasing number of officials were frustrated with his policies, no one in the regime wanted to risk a new period of domestic turmoil which might be caused by his death. Western commentators started guessing who Brezhnev's heir apparent was. The most notable candidates were Andrei Kirilenko and Mikhail Suslov, who were both older than Brezhnev, and Fyodor Kulakov, who was younger; Kulakov died of natural causes in 1978.

=== Last years and death ===
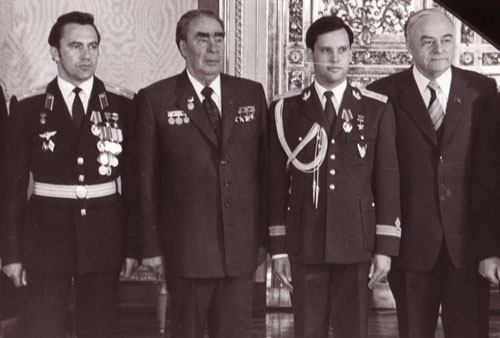
Brezhnev (second from left) on 1 June 1981, a year before his death

Brezhnev's health worsened in the winter of 1981–82. While the Politburo was pondering the question of who would succeed, all signs indicated that the ailing leader was dying. The choice of the successor would have been influenced by Suslov, but he died at the age of 79 in January 1982. Andropov took Suslov's seat in the Central Committee Secretariat; by May, it became obvious that Andropov would make a bid for the office of the General Secretary. With the help of fellow KGB associates, he started circulating rumors that political corruption had become worse during Brezhnev's tenure as leader, in an attempt to create an environment hostile to Brezhnev in the Politburo. Andropov's actions showed that he was not afraid of Brezhnev's wrath.

In March 1982, Brezhnev received a concussion and fractured his right clavicle while touring a factory in Tashkent, after a metal balustrade collapsed under the weight of a number of factory workers, falling on top of Brezhnev and his security detail. This incident was reported in Western media as Brezhnev having suffered a stroke. After a month-long recovery, Brezhnev worked intermittently through November. On 7 November 1982, he was present standing on the Lenin's Mausoleum's balcony during the annual military parade and demonstration of workers commemorating the 65th anniversary of the October Revolution. The event marked Brezhnev's final public appearance before dying three days later after suffering a heart attack. He was honored with a state funeral after a three-day period of nationwide mourning. He is buried in the Kremlin Wall Necropolis in Red Square, in one of the twelve individual tombs located between Lenin's Mausoleum and the Moscow Kremlin Wall. A number of countries including Cuba, Nicaragua, Mozambique, Afghanistan, India and others had declared national mourning over his death.

National and international statesmen from around the globe attended his funeral. His wife and family were also present. Brezhnev was dressed for burial in his Marshal's uniform.

== Personal life ==
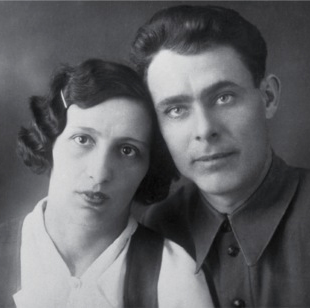
Brezhnev with his wife Viktoria, 1927

Brezhnev was married to Viktoria Denisova (1908–1995). He had a daughter, Galina, and a son, Yuri. His niece Lyubov Brezhneva published a memoir in 1995 which claimed that Brezhnev worked systematically to bring privileges to his family, including appointments, apartments, private luxury stores, private medical facilities, and immunity from prosecution.

=== Personality traits ===
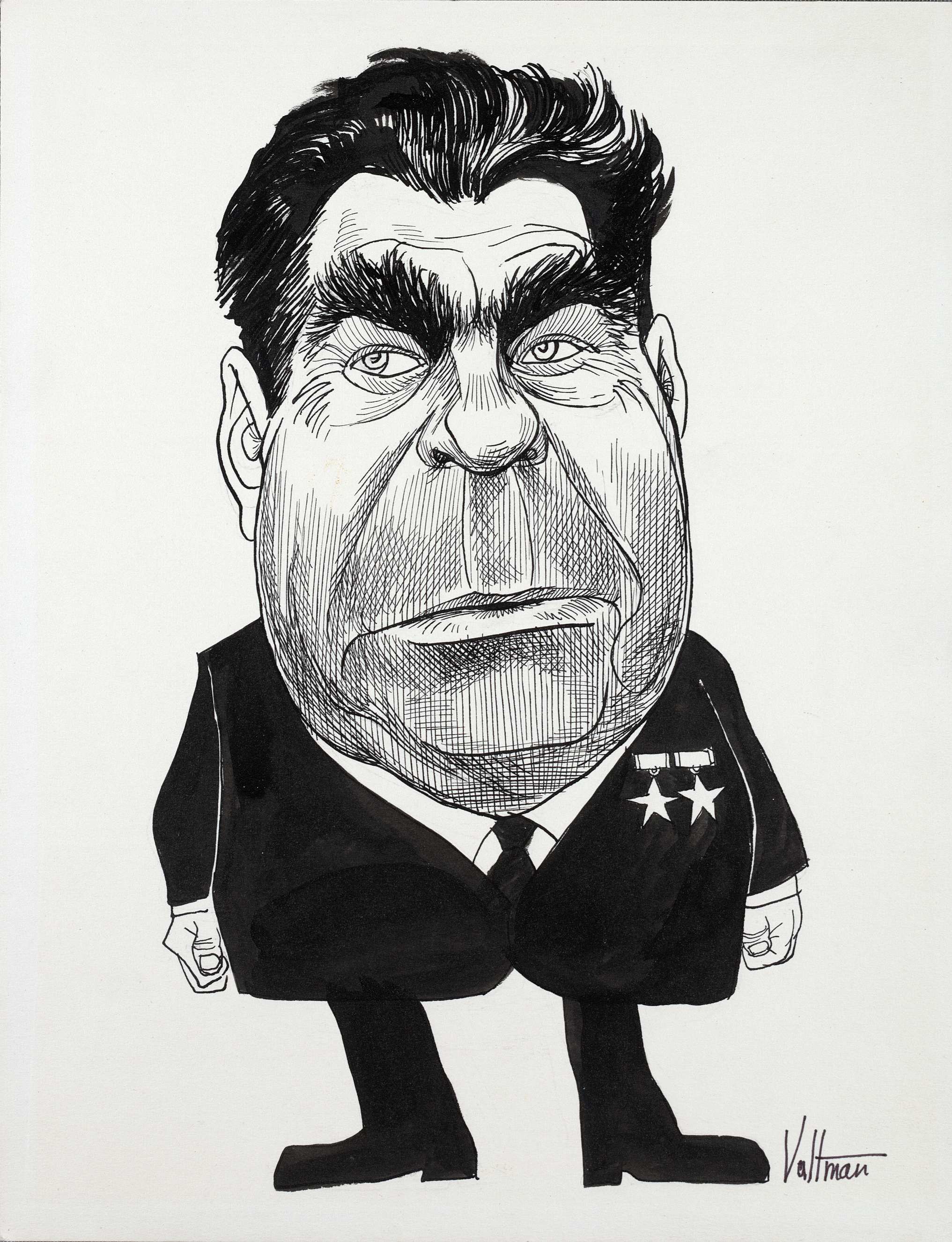
Caricature of Brezhnev by Edmund S. Valtman, 1968

Russian historian Roy Medvedev emphasizes the bureaucratic mentality and personality strengths that enabled Brezhnev to gain power. He was loyal to his friends, vain in desiring ceremonial power, and refused to control corruption inside the party. Especially in foreign affairs, Brezhnev increasingly took all major decisions into his own hands, without telling his colleagues in the Politburo. He deliberately presented a different persona to different people, culminating in the systematic glorification of his own career.

Brezhnev's vanity made him the target of many political jokes. Nikolai Podgorny warned him of this, but Brezhnev replied, "If they are poking fun at me, it means they like me."

In keeping with traditional socialist greetings, Brezhnev kissed many politicians on the lips during his career. One of these occasions, with Erich Honecker, was the subject of My God, Help Me to Survive This Deadly Love, a mural painted in 1990 on the Berlin Wall after its opening and dismantlement.

Brezhnev's main passion was driving foreign cars given to him by leaders of state from across the world. When visiting West Germany in 1973 and staying at the hill-top Hotel Petersberg, a Mercedes 450 SLC was presented to him. He soon crashed it in a tight turn of the mountain road. He usually drove these cars between his dacha and the Kremlin with, according to historian Robert Service, flagrant disregard for public safety. When visiting the United States for a summit with Richard Nixon in 1973, he expressed a wish to drive around Washington in a Lincoln Continental that Nixon had just given him; upon being told that the Secret Service would not allow him to do this, he said "I will take the flag off the car, put on dark glasses, so they can't see my eyebrows and drive like any American would", to which Henry Kissinger replied: "I have driven with you and I don't think you drive like an American!" He was also an avid fan of sports, and supported CSKA Moscow in ice hockey and Spartak Moscow in football. Kissinger claimed Brezhnev had on one occasion postponed a meeting on nuclear weapons because he did not want to miss a football match.

== Legacy ==
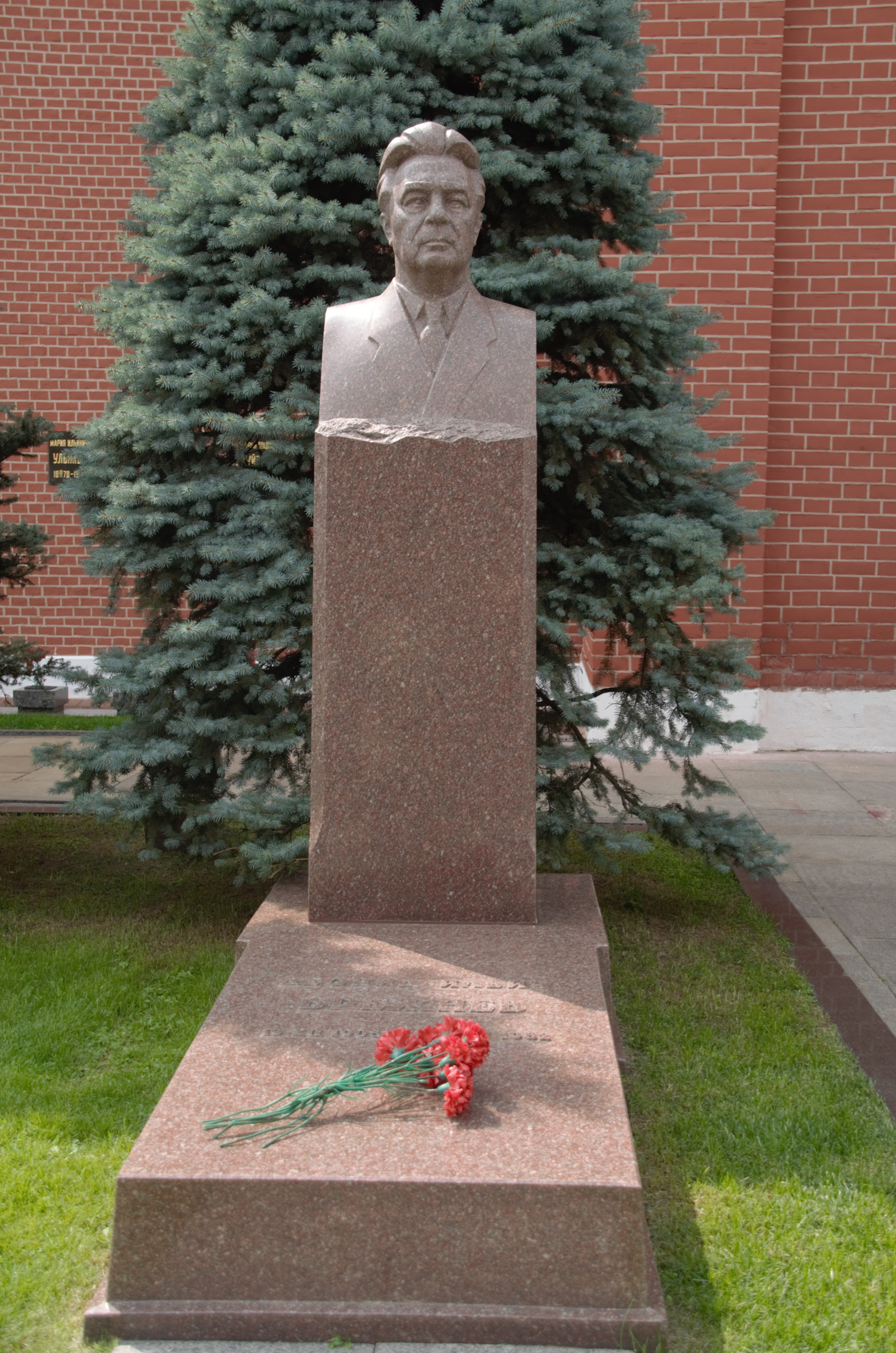
Brezhnev's tomb in the Kremlin Wall Necropolis

Brezhnev presided over the Soviet Union for longer than any other person except Joseph Stalin. He is remembered for donning the mantle of a peacemaker and a common-sense statesman. He is often criticised for the prolonged Era of Stagnation, in which fundamental economic problems were ignored and the Soviet political system was allowed to decline. During Mikhail Gorbachev's tenure as leader there was a sharp increase in criticism of Brezhnev's leadership, including claims that he followed "a fierce neo-Stalinist line" while consistently failing to modernize the country and change with the times. The intervention in Afghanistan, which was one of the major decisions of his career, also significantly undermined both the international standing and the internal strength of the Soviet Union.

Brezhnev fared better when compared to his successors and predecessors in Russia. In a 1999 poll, he ranked as the best Russian leader of the 20th century. In an opinion poll by VTsIOM in 2007 the majority of Russians chose to live during the Brezhnev era rather than any other period of 20th century Soviet history. In a Levada Center poll conducted in 2013, Brezhnev beat Vladimir Lenin and Joseph Stalin (respectively) as Russia's favorite leader in the 20th century with 56% approval. In another poll in 2013, Brezhnev was voted the best Russian leader of the 20th century. In a 2018 Rating Sociological Group poll, 47% of Ukrainian respondents had a positive opinion of Brezhnev.

In the West, the stagnation hypothesis is generally accepted with regards to the rule of Brezhnev.

=== Honours ===
Brezhnev received four times the Hero of the Soviet Union award, as well as the highest awards of socialist states such as Bulgaria, East Germany, Czechoslovakia, Cuba, Mongolia, and Vietnam.

== See also ==
- Attempted assassination of Leonid Brezhnev
- Bibliography of the post-Stalinist Soviet Union
- Neo-Stalinism

== General and cited references ==
- Anderson, David L.; Ernst, John (2007). The War That Never Ends: New Perspectives on the Vietnam War. University Press of Kentucky. ISBN 978-0813124735.
- Arnot, Bob (1988). Controlling Soviet Labour: Experimental Change from Brezhnev to Gorbachev. M.E. Sharpe. p. 67. ISBN 978-0873324700.
- Bacon, Edwin (2002). "Reconsidering Brezhnev". In Bacon, Edwin; Sandle, Mark (eds.). Brezhnev Reconsidered. Palgrave MacMillan Ltd. pp. 1–21. ISBN 978-0-333-79463-0.
- Bacon, Edwin; Sandle, Mark, eds. (2002). Brezhnev Reconsidered. Palgrave Macmillan. ISBN 978-0333794630.
- Bergson, Abram (1985). The Soviet Economy: Toward the Year 2000. Taylor & Francis. ISBN 978-0-04-335053-9.
- Braithwaite, Rodric (2011). Afgantsy: The Russians in Afghanistan 1979-89. Oxford University Press. ISBN 978-0199832651.
- Breslauer, George W. (1982). Khrushchev and Brezhnev as Leaders.
- Brown, Archie (2009). The Rise & Fall of Communism. New York City, NY: HarperCollins Publishers. ISBN 978-0061138799.
- Brutents, Karen N. (1998). Тридцать лет на Старой площади (Thirty Years on the Old Square) (in Russian). Moscow: Международные отношения (International Relations). ISBN 978-5-7133-0957-2. OCLC 1263966220.
- Byrne, Malcolm; Paczkowski, Andrzej (2008). From Solidarity to Martial Law: The Polish Crisis of 1980–1981. Central European University Press. p. 548. ISBN 978-9637326844.
- Chiesa, Giuliettlo (1991). Time of Change: Insider's View of Russia's Transformation. I.B. Tauris. ISBN 978-1850433057.
- Childs, David (2000). The Two Red Flags: European Social Democracy and Soviet communism since 1945. Routledge. ISBN 978-0415171816.
- Crump, Thomas (2013). Brezhnev and the Decline of the Soviet Union. Routledge. ISBN 978-1-134-66915-8.
- Dallin, David J. (1960). Soviet foreign policy after Stalin. OL 5800875M.
- Daniels, Robert Vincent (1998). Russia's Transformation: Snapshots of a Crumbling System. Rowman & Littlefield. ISBN 0-8476-8709-0.
- Dönninghaus, Victor; Savin, Andrei (2014). "Leonid Brezhnev: Public Display Versus the Sacrality of Power". Russian Studies in History. 52 (4): 71–93. doi:10.2753/RSH1061-1983520404.
- Dönninghaus, Victor; Savin, Andrei (2025). Леонид Брежнев. Опыт политической биографии [Leonid Brezhnev. An Experience of Political Biography] (in Russian). ЛитРес. ISBN 9785047794532.
- Gaddis, John Lewis (2005). The Cold War: A New History. Penguin Press. ISBN 978-1594200625.
- Green, William; Reeves, W. Robert (1993). The Soviet Military Encyclopedia: A–F. Westview Press. ISBN 978-0813314297.
- Guerrier, Steven W. (2020). "Podgorny, Nikolai Viktorovich (1903-1983)". In Tucker, Spencer C. (ed.). The Cold War: The Definitive Encyclopedia and Document Collection. ABC-CLIO. ISBN 9781440860768.
- Herd, Graeme P.; Moroney, Jennifer D. (2003). Security Dynamics in the former Soviet Bloc. Vol. 1. Routledge. ISBN 978-0415297325.
- Hiden, John; Made, Vahur; Smith, David J. (2008). The Baltic Question during the Cold War. Routledge. ISBN 978-0415569347.
- Hornsby, Robert (2023). The Soviet Sixties. Yale University Press. ISBN 9780300250527.
- Hough, Jerry; Fainsod, Merle (1979). How the Soviet Union Is Governed. Harvard University Press. ISBN 978-0674410305.
- Kakar, M. Hassan (1997). Afghanistan: The Soviet Invasion and the Afghan Response, 1979–1982. University of California Press. ISBN 978-0520208933.
- Kornberg, Judith; Faust, John (2005). China in World Politics: Policies, Processes, Prospects. UBC Press. ISBN 978-1588262486.
- Kort, Michael (2010). The Soviet Colossus: History and Aftermath. M. E. Sharpe. ISBN 978-0-7656-2387-4.
- Kotkin, Stephen (2008) [2001]. Armageddon Averted: The Soviet Collapse, 1970-2000 (2nd ed.). Oxford: Oxford University Press. ISBN 978-0195368642. OL 23187388M.
- Kotz, David Michael; Weir, Fred (2007). Russia's Path from Gorbachev to Putin: The Demise of the Soviet System and the New Russia. Taylor & Francis. ISBN 978-0-415-70146-4.
- Loth, Wilfried (2002). Overcoming the Cold War: a history of détente, 1950–1991. Palgrave Macmillan. ISBN 978-0-333-97111-6.
- McCauley, Martin (1997). Who's who in Russia since 1900. Routledge. ISBN 0-415-13898-1.
- McCauley, Martin (2008). Russia, America and the Cold War, 1949–1991. Pearson Education. ISBN 978-0582279360.
- McNeal, Robert (1975). The Bolshevik Tradition: Lenin, Stalin, Khrushchev, Brezhnev. Spectrum. ASIN B001VLGRB8.
- Magnúsdóttir, Rósa. "The Lives and Times of Leonid Brezhnev and Mikhail Gorbachev." Kritika: Explorations in Russian and Eurasian History 21.1 (2020): 207–217. excerpt
- Murphy, Paul J. (1981). Brezhnev: Soviet Politician. McFarland & Company. ISBN 978-0899500027.
- Nove, Alec. "Soviet agriculture under Brezhnev." Slavic Review 29.3 (1970): 379–410. online
- Oliver, Michael J.; Aldcroft, Derek Howard (2007). Economic Disasters of the Twentieth Century. Edward Elgar Publishing. ISBN 978-1848441583.
- Ostrovsky, Alexander. Кто поставил Горбачёва? (Who put Gorbachev?)(2010). Archived 7 August 2022 at the Wayback Machine. ISBN 978-5-699-40627-2.
- Pallot, Judith; Shaw, Denis (1981). Planning in the Soviet Union. Taylor & Francis. p. 51. ISBN 978-0-85664-571-6.
- Reynolds, David (2000). One World Divided:A Global History Since 1945. W.W. Norton. ISBN 0-393-04821-7.
- Rigby, T.H. (1989). "The Soviet Political Executive, 1917–1986". In Brown, Archie (ed.). Political Leadership in the Soviet Union. Bloomington, Indiana: Indiana University Press. pp. 4–53. ISBN 0-253-21228-6.
- Roeder, Philip G. (1993). Red Sunset: The Failure of Soviet Politics. Princeton University Press. ISBN 0691019428.
- Rutland, Peter; Smolkin-Rothrock, Victoria (2014). "Looking Back at Brezhnev". Russian History. 41 (3): 299–306. doi:10.1163/18763316-04103001.
- Sakwa, Richard (1998). Soviet Politics in Perspective. Routledge. ISBN 978-0415071536.
- Sakwa, Richard (1999). The Rise and Fall of the Soviet Union: 1917–1991. Routledge. ISBN 978-0582784659.
- Sandle, Mark (2002). "Brezhnev and Developed Socialism: The Ideology of Zastoi?". In Bacon, Edwin (ed.). Brezhnev Reconsidered. Palgrave MacMillan Ltd. pp. 165–187. ISBN 978-0-333-79463-0.
- Schattenberg, Susanne. "Emotions and Play-acting in the Cold War: How Leonid Brezhnev Won and Lost the West's Trust", Soviet and Post-Soviet Review 45.3 (2018): 313–341. online
- Schattenberg, Susanne (2017). Leonid Breschnew: Staatsmann und Schauspieler im Schatten Stalins: eine Biographie (in German). Wien: Böhlau Verlag. doi:10.7788/9783412509934. ISBN 978-3-412-50209-6. OCLC 1041432319. S2CID 186937428.
- Schattenberg, Susanne (2021). Brezhnev: The Making of a Statesman". Bloomsbury Publishing. ISBN 9780755642113.
- Service, Robert (2003). A History of Modern Russia: From Nicholas II to Vladimir Putin. Harvard University Press. ISBN 0-674-01801-X.
- Service, Robert (2009). History of Modern Russia: From Tsarism to the Twenty-first Century (3 ed.). Penguin Books Ltd. ISBN 978-0674034938.
- Mitrokhin, Nikolai [in Russian] (2011). "The rise of political clans in the era of Nikita Khrushchev: The first phase, 1953–1959". In Smith, Jeremy (ed.). Khrushchev in the Kremlin: Policy and Government in the Soviet Union, 1953–64. Taylor & Francis. pp. 26–40. ISBN 9781136831829.
- Szumski, Jakub (September 2018). "Leonid Brezhnev and Edward Gierek: The Making and Breaking of an Uneven Friendship" (subscription required). The Soviet and Post-Soviet Review 45.3: 253-286. doi:10.1163/18763324-20181290.
- Taubman, William (2003). Khrushchev: The Man and His Era. W. W. Norton & Company. ISBN 978-0393051445.
- Wegren, Stephen (1998). Agriculture and the State in Soviet and Post-Soviet Russia. University of Pittsburgh Press. ISBN 978-0-8229-8585-3.
- Wesson, Robert G. (1978). Lenin's Legacy: The Story of the CPSU. Hoover Press. ISBN 978-0817969226.
- Willerton, John P. (1992). Patronage and Politics in the USSR. Cambridge University Press. ISBN 0521392888.
- Zemtsov, Ilya (1989). Chernenko: The Last Bolshevik: The Soviet Union on the Eve of Perestroika. Transaction Publishers. ISBN 0-88738-260-6.
- Zubok, Vladislav (2009) [1st pub. 2007]. A Failed Empire: The Soviet Union in the Cold War from Stalin to Gorbachev. UNC Press. ISBN 978-0-8078-5958-2.
- Zubok, Vladislav (2015). "'Do Not Think I Am Soft...': Leonid Brezhnev". Mental Maps in the Era of Détente and the End of the Cold War 1968–91. pp. 6-23.

Party political offices
Preceded by Pavel Naidenov	Leader of the Regional Party Committee of Dnipropetrovsk; 1947–1950	Succeeded by Andrei Kirilenko
Preceded by Nicolae Coval	First Secretary of the Communist Party of Moldova; 1950–1952	Succeeded by Dimitri Gladki
Preceded by Panteleimon Ponomarenko	First Secretary of the Communist Party of Kazakhstan; 1955–1956	Succeeded by Ivan Yakovlev
Preceded by Frol Kozlov	Second Secretary of the Communist Party of the Soviet Union; 15 July 1964–14 October 1964	Succeeded by Nikolai Podgorny
Preceded by Nikita Khrushchev	General Secretary of the Communist Party of the Soviet Union (as First Secretary between 1964 and 1966); 14 October 1964 – 10 November 1982	Succeeded by Yuri Andropov
Preceded by Nikita Khrushchev	Chairman of the Bureau of the Central Committee of the Russian Soviet Federative Socialist Republic; 1964–1966	Position abolished
Political offices
Preceded by Kliment Voroshilov	Chairman of the Presidium of the Supreme Soviet; 7 May 1960 – 15 July 1964	Succeeded by Anastas Mikoyan
Preceded by Nikolai Podgorny	Chairman of the Presidium of the Supreme Soviet; 16 June 1977 – 10 November 1982	Succeeded by Yuri Andropov
