= Parity =

Parity may refer to:

== Computing ==
- Parity bit in computing, sets the parity of data for the purpose of error detection
- Parity flag in computing, indicates if the number of set bits is odd or even in the binary representation of the result of the last operation
- Parity file in data processing, created in conjunction with data files and used to check data integrity and assist in data recovery

== Mathematics ==
- Parity (mathematics), indicates whether a number is even or odd
  - Parity of a permutation, indicates whether a permutation has an even or odd number of inversions
  - Parity function, a Boolean function whose value is 1 if the input vector has an odd number of ones
  - Parity learning, a problem in machine learning
  - Parity of even and odd functions

== Physics ==
- Parity (physics), a symmetry property of physical quantities or processes under spatial inversion; see also intrinsic parity for the related quantum number
- Charge parity, a quantum number related to charge conjugation symmetry
- Parity measurement, a procedure used for error detection in quantum information science
- R-parity, an internal symmetry of the Minimal Supersymmetric Standard Model and other supersymmetric theories

== Other uses ==
- Parity (biology), the number of times a female has given birth; gravidity and parity represent pregnancy and viability, respectively
- Gender parity, ratios in statistical indicators between people of different genders in a population
- Parity (charity), UK equal rights organisation
- Parity (law), legal principle in European law
- In healthcare, the principal of assigning equal value to mental and physical wellbeing is sometimes referred to as parity
  - Parity of esteem, the name for this principle used in the UK
  - Mental Health Parity Act, legislation in the United States requiring parity in healthcare benefits
- Purchasing power parity, in economics, the exchange rate required to equalise the purchasing power of different currencies
- Interest rate parity, in finance, the notion that the differential in interest rates between two countries is equal to the differential between the forward exchange rate and the spot exchange rate
- Put–call parity, in financial mathematics, defines a relationship between the price of a European call option and a European put option
- Parity (sports), a situation in which competing sports teams have roughly equivalent levels of talent
- Potty parity, equalization of waiting times for males and females in restroom queues
- A tactic in reversi
- Grid parity of renewable energy
- Doctrine of parity, agricultural price controls
- Military parity, equipotential readiness between foes; the lack of such parity may be referred to as a "gap", such as the missile gap
  - Nuclear parity, a situation of equal strategic nuclear weapon capabilities between superpowers
- Special cases in combination puzzles
