= Paritarian institution =

Non-profit institutions which are jointly managed by the social partners

In the field of social protection, paritarian institutions are non-profit institutions which are jointly managed by the social partners (representatives of the employers and employees). In other words, the governance of these institutions is based on the equal representation of employees (normally the trade unions) and employers in their governing bodies.

The social protection funds managed by the paritarian institutions are set up through collective agreements at the company, the industry-wide (such as construction sector, metal sector, etc.) or the inter-sectoral level, and they can provide several social benefits such as pension (in particular occupational pension funds), health care, unemployment, disability, paid holidays, and other such benefits.

Within the paritarian model there are two phases: in the negotiation phase, when a collective agreement between the trade unions and the employers’ representatives set up the social fund; and in the management phase, the signatory parties decide to manage their negotiated social funds themselves by establishing a Paritarian Institution in which they are equally represented.

Paritarian Institutions of Social Protection are widespread in Europe, especially in Western Europe and Scandinavia. The combined funds currently managed by the Paritarian Institutions of Social Protection total to a rough estimate of 1.3 trillion euro in assets and cover about 80 million European citizens.

In 1996, a European Organization the European Association of Paritarian Institutions of Social Protection (AEIP) was created in order to represent the Paritarian Institutions to the European Union. AEIP underlines the specific peculiarities of the Paritarian Institutions compared to other similar actors like private insurance companies or mutual organizations.

Even though of European origins, paritarian institutions also exist in other parts of the world like in North America, South America, India, and Japan.

Paritarian governance is also found in some employee trusts.

== Etymology ==
Paritarian (from the French "paritaire"; "paritair" in Dutch, "paritätische" in German, "Paritetico" in Italian) means jointly managed on an equal basis (parity basis).
