= Victor Dönninghaus =

German historian

- Born: 1964 (age 61–62)

Academic background
- Education: Dnipropetrovsk State University
- Thesis: Nationality Policy in Crimea from 1921–1925 (1993)

Academic work
- Institutions: University of Freiburg; Northeast Institute

Victor Dönninghaus (born in 1964) is a German historian.

== Biography ==
Dönninghaus defended his Ph.D. thesis on Soviet nationalities policy at Dnipropetrovsk State University in Ukraine in 1993. After that, he moved to Germany and worked at the Institute for Culture and History of the Germans in Eastern Europe at the University of Düsseldorf from 1996 to 2002. In 2006, Dönninghaus obtained his habilitation degree from the University of Freiburg and also worked for a brief period of time at the University of Konstanz.

From 2009 to 2013, he worked at the German Historical Institute Moscow and served as its deputy director for three years. After that, Dönninghaus was associated with the North-East Institute, affiliated with the University of Hamburg, serving as its deputy director since 2014.

== Books ==
- — (2002). Die Deutschen in der Moskauer: Gesellschaft Symbiose und Konflikte (1494-1941) [The Germans in Moscow Society: Symbiosis and Conflicts (1494–1941)] (in German). München: Oldenbourg. ISBN 9783486566383.
- — (2002). Revolution, Reform und Krieg : die Deutschen an der Wolga im ausgehenden Zarenreich [Revolution, Reform, and War: The Germans on the Volga in the Late Tsarist Empire] (in German). Essen: Klartext. ISBN 389861090X.
- — (2009). Minderheiten in Bedrängnis : sowjetische Politik gegenüber Deutschen, Polen und anderen Diaspora-Nationalitäten 1917-1938 [Minorities in Distress: Soviet Policy Towards Germans, Poles, and Other Diaspora Nationalities 1917–1938] (in German). München: Oldenbourg Verlag. ISBN 9783486588729.
- —; Savin, Andrei (2019). Unter dem wachsamen Auge des Staates : Religiöser Dissens der Russlanddeutschen in der Breschnew-Ära [Under the Watchful Eye of the State: Religious Dissent of the Russian Germans in the Brezhnev Era] (in German). Wiesbaden: Harrassowitz Verlag. ISBN 9783447199452.
- —; Savin, Andrei (2024). Леонид Брежнев: опыт политической биографии [Leonid Brezhnev: An Experience of Political Biography] (in Russian). Moscow: ROSSPEN. ISBN 9785824325737.
