= Susanne Schattenberg =

German historian

- Born: 24 June 1969 (age 57); Hamburg, Germany

Academic background
- Education: European University Viadrina
- Doctoral advisor: Karl Schlögel

Academic work
- Institutions: Humboldt University of Berlin; University of Bremen

Susanne Schattenberg (born 24 June 1969, in Hamburg) is a German historian.

Schattenberg received a Master of Arts in Slavic studies in 1995. She defended a PhD thesis in 1999 at European University Viadrina under the supervision of Karl Schlögel.

In 2006, she was habilitated at Humboldt University of Berlin and two years later became a professor for Contemporary History and Culture of Eastern Europe at the University of Bremen. Since 2023, Schattenberg has served as a member of the editorial board of the historical journal, The Russian Review.

== Books ==
- Stalins Ingenieure : Lebenswelten zwischen Technik und Terror in den 1930er Jahren [Stalin's Engineers: Worlds of Life Between Technology and Terror in the 1930s] (in German). Berlin: Oldenbourg Wissenschaftsverlag. 2009 [2002]. ISBN 9783486596212. OCLC 999362239.
- Die korrupte Provinz? : Russische Beamte im 19. Jahrhundert [The Corrupt Province? : Russian Officials in the 19th Century] (in German). Frankfurt: Campus-Verlag. 2008. ISBN 9783593386102. OCLC 308561997.
- Brezhnev: The Making of a Statesman. London: I.B. Tauris, Bloomsbury Publishing Plc. 2022 [2017]. ISBN 9780755642120. OCLC 1245833830.
- Geschichte der Sowjetunion : von der Oktoberrevolution bis zum Untergang [History of the Soviet Union: From the October Revolution to the Collapse] (in German). Munich: C.H. Beck. 2022. ISBN 9783406785191. OCLC 1336989274.
