= Nuclear parity =

State of two powers having similar nuclear capabilities

Nuclear parity is a situation where opposing superpowers have comparable and roughly equal strategic nuclear weapons capabilities. The expiration of the New START treaty between Russia and the United States on February 5, 2026 was described as "the end of nuclear parity and the beginning of an era of uncertainty".

Following the dissolution of the Soviet Union, the issue of nuclear parity became temporarily moot as Russia signed the START II treaty. The 2000s saw a tendency for the reduction of Russian nuclear forces at a faster pace than American ones, as Russia decommissioned its out-of-service delivery means more quickly. But by 2014 Russia has caught up with the United States in the number of all nuclear delivery means within the Strategic Nuclear Forces, as well as in the number of deployed warheads.
