= Parity (law) =

Principle of parity is a legal concept used in codecision procedure that disables one European institution from making decisions without obtaining assent from any other institutions engaged in the procedure.
