= Tatjana Michaylovna Zacharova =

Tatjana Zacharova
- Татьяна Захарова
- Born: Tatjana Michaylovna Zacharova; 21 January 1931 (age 95); Verkhnii Lomovets, Dolgorukovsky District, Central Black Earth Oblast, Russian SFSR
- Occupations: Factory worker Author; Politician
- Years active: 1941–present
- Children: 3
- Awards: Medal "For Valiant Labour in the Great Patriotic War 1941–1945"; Order of the Red Banner of Labour; Hero of Socialist Labour; Order of Lenin "Hammer and Sickle" gold medal Order of the Badge of Honour; Order of Friendship of Peoples

Tatjana Michaylovna Zacharova (Russian: Татьяна Михайловна Захарова; born 21 January 1931) is a Russian production worker, author of prose and politician who worked for 33 years at the workshop of the Laminated Plastics Plant (today Sloplast LLC) from 1951 to 1984. She was an elected deputy of the tenth and eleventh convocations of the Supreme Soviet of Russia between 1980 and 1990 and was an active worker of the Union of Soviet Societies for Friendship and Cultural Relations with Foreign Countries and the Committee of Soviet Women. Zacharova has been awarded the Medal "For Valiant Labour in the Great Patriotic War 1941–1945", the Order of the Red Banner of Labour, the Hero of Socialist Labour with the Order of Lenin and the "Hammer and Sickle" gold medal, the Order of the Badge of Honour, the Order of Friendship of Peoples.

== Biography ==
On 21 January 1931, Zacharova was born into a large, peasant family in the village of Verkhnii Lomovets, Dolgorukovsky District, Central Black Earth Oblast (today the Lipetsk Oblast). She has one elder sister. Throughout the Great Patrotic War, from the age of ten, Zacharova worked on a collective farm 9 kilometres (5.6 mi) from the front line with adults. In early 1947, two years after the conclusion of the war, she left the collective farm and moved to Leningrad (today Saint Petersburg. Zacharova became employed at the Laminated Plastics Plant of the Ministry of the Chemical Industry (today Sloplast LLC) in 1951 and worked at its workshop for the following 33 years. Her name was entered into the plant's honorary book on 5 November 1953 when she was 22 years old "for the high production indicators achieved in the socialist competition".

To start the seventh five-year plan lasting from 1959 to 1965, the plant with Zacharova's participation finished a special government task and mastered a new product type. The eighth five-year plan between 1966 and 1970 saw her be part of the creation a workshop for decorative paper layered plastics in which she led a team mastered the new machines much earlier than the government deadline for which the country received products worth millions of Soviet rubles six months earlier than scheduled. The ninth five-year plan from 1971 to 1975 saw her team introduce the Shchekino method that freed 50 per cent of the apparatchiks while raising the volume output by one-and-a-half times within three years. The tenth five-year plan lasting 1976 to 1980 saw the laminated plant commence reconstruction and workers studied the construction of new equipment according to drawings and passed examinations. Zacharova retired from the plant in 1984.

She was a member of the Communist Party of the Soviet Union. Zacharova was an active worker of the Committee of Soviet Women, the Union of Soviet Societies for Friendship and Cultural Relations with Foreign Countries and she was vice-president of the USSR-USA society. She is a member of the board of the Cuba-Russia society, is a worker in the section of Heroes of Socialist Labour at the Interregional City of St. Petersburg and the Leningrad Region of the All-Russian Public Organization of Veterans of War, Labor, Armed Forces and law enforcement agencies. Zacharova is a member of the Union of Russian Writers, the Union of Writers of Russia since 2004, and of the editorial board of the radio station Radio Newspaper Slovo. She was a delegate to the 25th Congress of the Communist Party of the Soviet Union in 1976, and from 1980 to 1990, she was an elected deputy in the tenth and eleventh convocations of the Supreme Soviet of Russia. Zacharova served as an elected member of the Leningrad Regional Committee of the Communist Party of the Soviet Union and was a member of the city Committee of People's Control. She partook in the Moscow International Conference on Peace Problems in 1982.

Zacharova was the author of diaries throughout her life, and books on them have been published. She has written the books The joy of creative work in 1981, What will you come to people with in 2004, Mountain Eagle in 2006 A handful of earth in 2007, Life, Tell me about me in 2009, Non-foreign and Next:story in 2010 and the content of one of the books – Unbroken in 2013 – consists of a direct conversation with survivors of a blockage, who talk about the difficulties of such a life, The light of the soul is inextinguishable in 2018.

== Personal life ==
She got married in 1948 and she is the mother of three children.

== Awards ==
Zacharova has received various awards during her life. As a 14-year old teenager, upon the conclusion of the Great Patrotic War, she was awarded the Medal "For Valiant Labour in the Great Patriotic War 1941–1945". Zacharova received the Order of the Red Banner of Labour on 28 May 1966, the title of Hero of Socialist Labour with the Order of Lenin and the "Hammer and Sickle" gold medal by the Decree of the Presidium of the Supreme Soviet of the Soviet Union on 20 April 1971, the Order of the Badge of Honour on 5 March 1976 and the Order of Friendship of Peoples for her active social work on 6 April 1981. Zacharova is a laureate of the Big Dipper prize of the Association of Public Associations of St. Petersburg and the Leningrad Region and is an Honorary Resident of the Krasnogvardeysky District, Saint Petersburg.
