= Ninth five-year plan (Soviet Union) =

Soviet economic plan

The ninth five-year plan of the Union of Soviet Socialist Republics (USSR) was a set of economic goals designed to strengthen the country's economy between 1971 and 1975. There was a marked slowdown in nearly all sectors of the Soviet economy by the time it ended. The plan was presented by the Chairman of the Council of Ministers Alexei Kosygin at the 24th Congress of the Communist Party of the Soviet Union (CPSU) in 1971.

== The 24th Congress and development ==
The ninth five-year plan was presented to the 24th Congress of the Communist Party of the Soviet Union (CPSU) in 1971 by Alexei Kosygin, the Chairman of the Council of Ministers. The plan's main focus was to increase the growth of industrial produced consumer goods. It was the first five-year plan to call for a higher increase for industrial consumer goods than in capital goods. Brezhnev told the Congress that increasing the standard of living was more important than economic development. The plan proposed an increase in gross national income (GNP) by 37 to 40 percent.

== Fulfillment ==
The goals set by the 24th Party Congress were not fulfilled, and for the first time, the Soviet economy was facing stagnating growth. While the planned target in consumer goods was higher than in previous plans, the actual growth was far from that planned. Historian Robert Service notes in his book History of Modern Russia: From Tsarism to the Twenty-First Century that the economic ministries, in collaboration with the Soviet party-police-military-industrial complex, purposely prevented the targets from being fulfilled. During the plan, investment in the truck industry increased, but the inefficiencies and relative backwardness of blueprints and technology innovation, as noted by Kosygin, were not solved. During the period covered by the plan, Soviet agriculture was hit by chronic drought and bad weather, which led grain production to be 70 million tons short of the planned target. The plan called for the capacity of the Coal Handling and Preparation Plants (CHPP) to increase from 47,000 Megawatt (MW) to 65,000 by 1975; CHPP capacity only reached 59,800 MW. By the end of the ninth five-year plan, there was a marked slowdown in nearly all sectors of the Soviet economy.

Not everything was a failure, as investment in computer technology increased by 420 percent over the previous plan. It was estimated by the Soviet government that 200,000 workers were involved in improving and introducing modern computer technology in the country. These computer technicians were developing the Automated System for Management (ASU) in an attempt to improve factory and labour productivity. Average real income increased by 4.5 percent per annum.

== See also ==
- First five-year plan (Soviet Union)
- Tenth five-year plan (Soviet Union)
- Eleventh five-year plan (Soviet Union)

| Preceded by 8th Plan; 1968 – 1971 | 9th Five-Year Plan; 1971–1975 | Succeeded by 10th Plan; 1975 – 1980 |
