= Alexei Kosygin =

Soviet politician (1904–1980)

- Алексей Косыгин
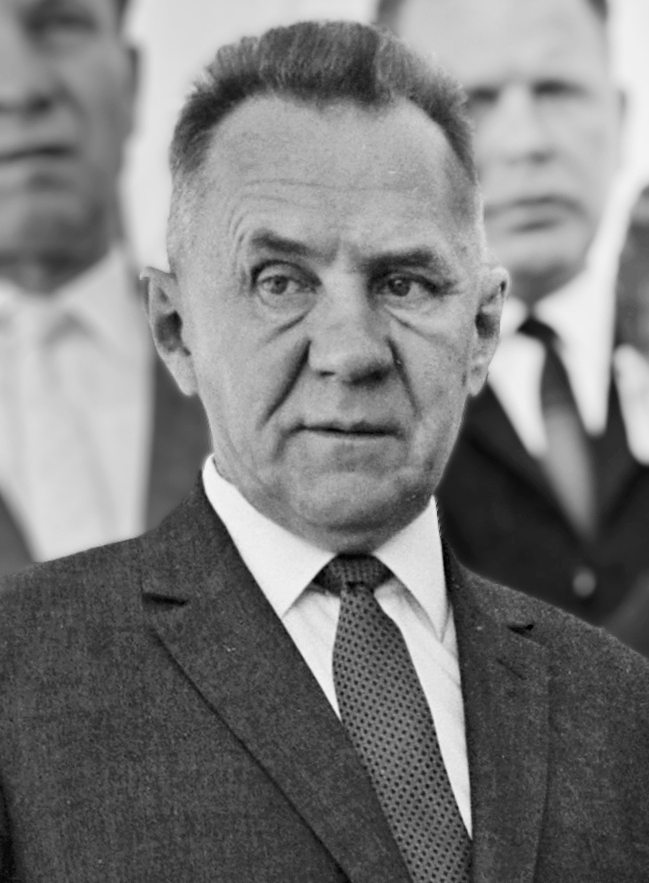
- Kosygin in 1966

Premier of the Soviet Union
- In office 15 October 1964 – 23 October 1980
- President: Anastas Mikoyan; Nikolai Podgorny; Leonid Brezhnev
- First Deputies: See list: Dmitriy Ustinov; Kirill Mazurov; Dmitry Polyansky; Nikolai Tikhonov
- Preceded by: Nikita Khrushchev
- Succeeded by: Nikolai Tikhonov

First Deputy Premier of the Soviet Union
- In office 4 May 1960 – 15 October 1964
- Premier: Nikita Khrushchev
- Preceded by: Frol Kozlov
- Succeeded by: Dmitriy Ustinov

Chairman of the State Planning Committee
- In office 20 March 1959 – 4 May 1960
- Premier: Nikita Khrushchev
- Preceded by: Joseph Kuzmin
- Succeeded by: Vladimir Novikov

Chairman of the Council of People's Commissars of the Russian SFSR
- In office 23 June 1943 – 23 March 1946
- President: Alexei Badayev; Nikolai Shvernik
- Preceded by: Ivan Khokhlov
- Succeeded by: Mikhail Rodionov (Note: As Chairman of the Council of Ministers)

Personal details
- Born: 21 February [O.S. 8 February] 1904 Saint Petersburg, Russian Empire
- Died: 18 December 1980 (aged 76) Moscow, Russian SFSR, Soviet Union
- Resting place: Kremlin Wall Necropolis, Moscow
- Citizenship: Soviet
- Party: Communist Party of the Soviet Union (1927–1980)
- Spouse: Klavdia Andreyevna (died 1967)
- Profession: Teacher, civil servant
- Awards: Hero of Socialist Labour

Military service
- Allegiance: Russian SFSR
- Branch/service: Red Army
- Years of service: 1919–1921
- Rank: Conscript
- Commands: Red Army
- Battles/wars: Russian Civil War
- Central institution membership: 1966-1980: Full member, 23rd, 24th, 25th Politburo; 1961-1966: Full member, 22nd Presidium; 1952-1953, 1957–1960: Candidate member, 19th & 20th Presidium of the Communist Party of the Soviet Union; 1948-1952: Full member, 18th Politburo; 1946-1948: Candidate member, 18th Politburo of the Communist Party of the Soviet Union; 1939–1980: Member of the 18th, 19th, 20th, 22nd, 23rd, 24th and 25th Central Committee of the Communist Party of the Soviet Union; Other political offices held: 1953–1956,1957–1960: Deputy Premier of the Soviet Union; 1953-1954: Minister of Consumer Goods; 1948-1953: Minister of Light and Food Industry; 1948, February–December: Minister of Finance; 1946-1953: Deputy Chairman of the Council of Ministers; 1940–1946: Deputy Chairman of the Council of People's Commissars; 1939–1940: People's Commissar for Textile & Industry; 1938–1939: Chairman of the Leningrad Executive Committee

Alexei Nikolayevich Kosygin (Note: Russian: Алексе́й Никола́евич Косы́гин, IPA: [ɐlʲɪkˈsʲej nʲɪkɐˈla(j)ɪvʲɪtɕ kɐˈsɨɡʲɪn]) (21 February [O.S. 8 February] 1904 – 18 December 1980) was a Soviet statesman who served as the Chairman of the Council of Ministers from 1964 to 1980. Following Nikita Khrushchev's removal from power, he briefly led the Soviet Union as part of a triumvirate in the mid-to-late 1960s.

Alexei Kosygin was born in the city of Saint Petersburg in 1904 to a Russian working-class family. During the Russian Civil War, he was conscripted into the labour army. After the Red Army's demobilization in 1921, he worked in Siberia as an industrial manager. In the early 1930s, Kosygin returned to Leningrad and worked his way up the Soviet hierarchy. During the Great Patriotic War (World War II), Kosygin was tasked by the State Defence Committee with moving Soviet industry out of territories soon to be overrun by the German Army. He served as Minister of Finance for a year before becoming Minister of Light Industry (later, Minister of Light Industry and Food). However, in 1952, Stalin removed Kosygin from the Politburo, thereby weakening Kosygin's position within the Soviet hierarchy.

Following Stalin's death in 1953, Kosygin was appointed chairman of the State Planning Committee (Gosplan) on 20 March 1959. Later, in 1960, he was promoted to First Deputy Chairman of the Council of Ministers. When Nikita Khrushchev was removed from power on 14 October 1964, Kosygin and Leonid Brezhnev succeeded him as Chairman of the Council of Ministers and First Secretary of the Communist Party respectively. Thereafter, he formed a triumvirate alongside Brezhnev and Central Committee Secretary Nikolai Podgorny that led the Soviet regime in Khrushchev's place.

Upon Khrushchev's ouster, Alexei Kosygin initially emerged as the Soviet Union's head of government in both name and practice. In addition to overseeing the country's economy, he assumed a preeminent role in directing its foreign policy. However, in 1968, the Prague Spring triggered a massive backlash against his reforms, thereby enabling Leonid Brezhnev to eclipse him as the dominant force in the Soviet leadership. Despite having his standing significantly weakened in the Kremlin, Kosygin was permitted by Brezhnev to remain in office until his retirement on 15 October 1980 due to bad health. He died two months later on 18 December 1980.

== Early life ==
Kosygin was born into a Russian working-class family consisting of his father and mother (Nikolai Ilyich and Matrona Alexandrovna) and his siblings. The family lived in Saint Petersburg. Kosygin was baptized (7 March 1904) one month after his birth. He lost his mother in infancy and was brought up by his father.

He and his father sympathized with the Revolution and Alexei was conscripted into a labour army on the Bolshevik side at the age of 14 during the Russian Civil War of 1917–1922. After demobilization from the Red Army in 1921, Kosygin attended the Leningrad Co-operative Technical School and found work in the system of consumer co-operatives in Novosibirsk, Siberia. When asked why he worked in the co-operative sector of the economy, Kosygin replied, quoting a slogan of Vladimir Lenin: "Co-operation – the path to socialism!" Kosygin stayed there for six years until Robert Eikhe advised him to quit, shortly before the repressions hit the Soviet consumer co-operation movement.

== Early career ==
=== Pre-war period ===
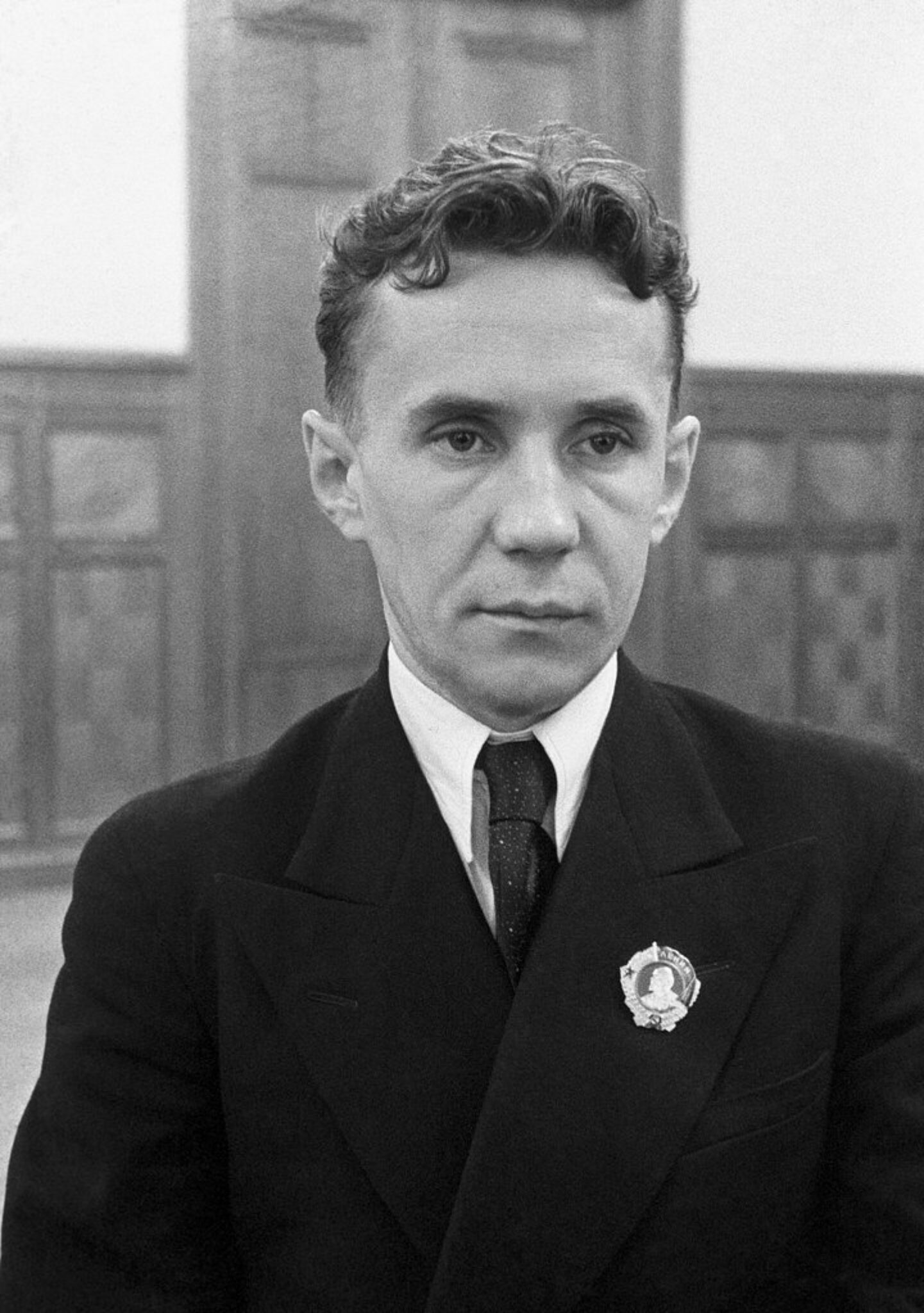
Kosygin as People's Commissar, 1939

He applied for a membership in the Communist Party of the Soviet Union in 1927 and returned to Leningrad in 1930 to study at the Leningrad Textile Institute; he graduated in 1935. After finishing his studies, Kosygin worked as a foreman and later a manager as a textile mill director. He rose rapidly during the Great Purge, overseen in Leningrad by the provincial communist party boss, Andrei Zhdanov. He was appointed director of the October Textile Factory in 1937, head of the Industry and Transport department of the Leningrad provincial communist party in July 1938, and in October 1938, Chairman of the Executive Committee of the Leningrad City Soviets of Working People's Deputies, i.e. 'mayor' of Leningrad City. In 1939, he was appointed People's Commissar for Textile and Industry and earned a seat on the Central Committee (CC). In 1940 Kosygin became a Deputy Chairman of the Council of People's Commissars.

=== Wartime ===
Kosygin was appointed by the State Defence Committee to manage critically important missions during the Great Patriotic War (World War II).

As deputy chairman of the Council of Evacuation, he had the task of evacuating industry from territories about to be overrun by the Axis. Under his command 1,523 factories were evacuated eastwards, as well as huge volumes of raw materials, ready-made goods and equipment. Kosygin managed clearing of congestions on the railways in order to maintain their stable operation.

During the Leningrad Blockade he was sent to his hometown to manage the construction of an ice road and a pipeline across Lake Ladoga. This allowed to evacuate some half million people from the besieged and starving city, and to supply fuel to its factories and power plants. He was also responsible for the procurement of locally available firewood.

In 1943 Alexey Kosygin was promoted to Chairman of the Council of People's Commissars (government) of the Russian SFSR. In 1944 he was appointed to head the Currency Board of the Soviet Union.

=== Postwar period ===
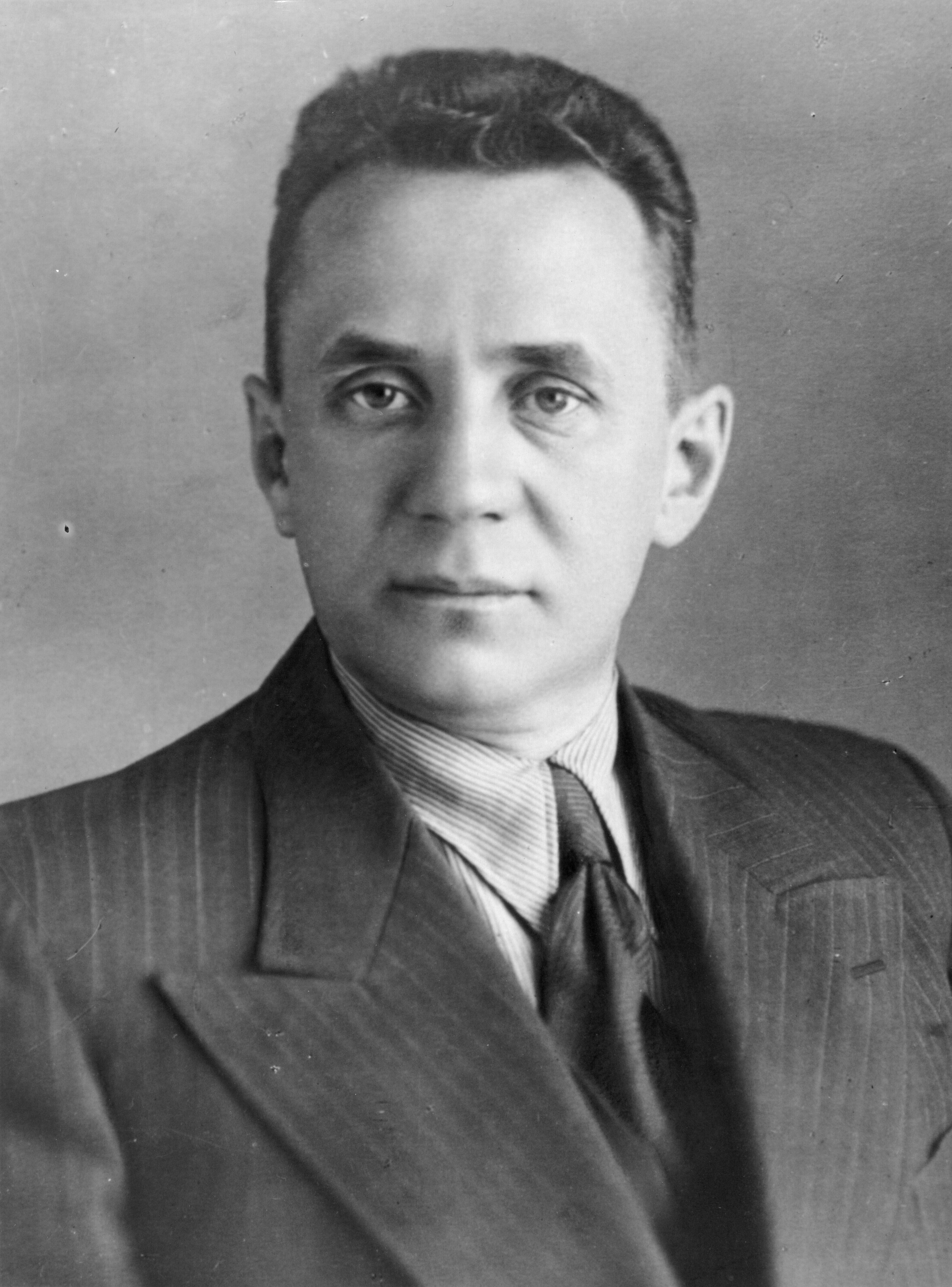
Kosygin c. 1951

Kosygin became a candidate member of the Politburo in 1946. During the Soviet famine of 1946–47 he headed the foodstuff relief missions to the most suffering regions. He was appointed USSR Minister for Finance in February 1948, and a full member of the Politburo on 4 September 1948, putting him among the dozen or so most ranking officials in the USSR.

Kosygin's administrative skills led Stalin to take the younger man under his wing. Stalin shared information with Kosygin, such as how much money the families of Vyacheslav Molotov, Anastas Mikoyan, and Lazar Kaganovich possessed, spent and paid their staff. (A Politburo member earned a modest salary by Soviet standards but enjoyed unlimited access to consumer goods.) Stalin sent Kosygin to each home to put their houses into "proper order".

=== Temporary fall ===
Kosygin's patron, Zhdanov, died suddenly in August 1948. Soon afterwards, Zhdanov's old rivals Lavrentiy Beria and Georgy Malenkov persuaded Stalin to let them remove members of the decapitated Zhdanov faction, of whom the three most prominent were Nikolai Voznesensky, then Chairman of the State Planning Committee and a First Deputy Premier, Alexey Kuznetsov, the party secretary with oversight over the security, and Kosygin. During the brutal purge that followed, known as the Leningrad affair, Voznesensky, Kuznetsov and many others were arrested and shot. Kosygin was relegated to the post of USSR Minister for Light Industry, while nominally retaining his membership of the Politburo until 1952.

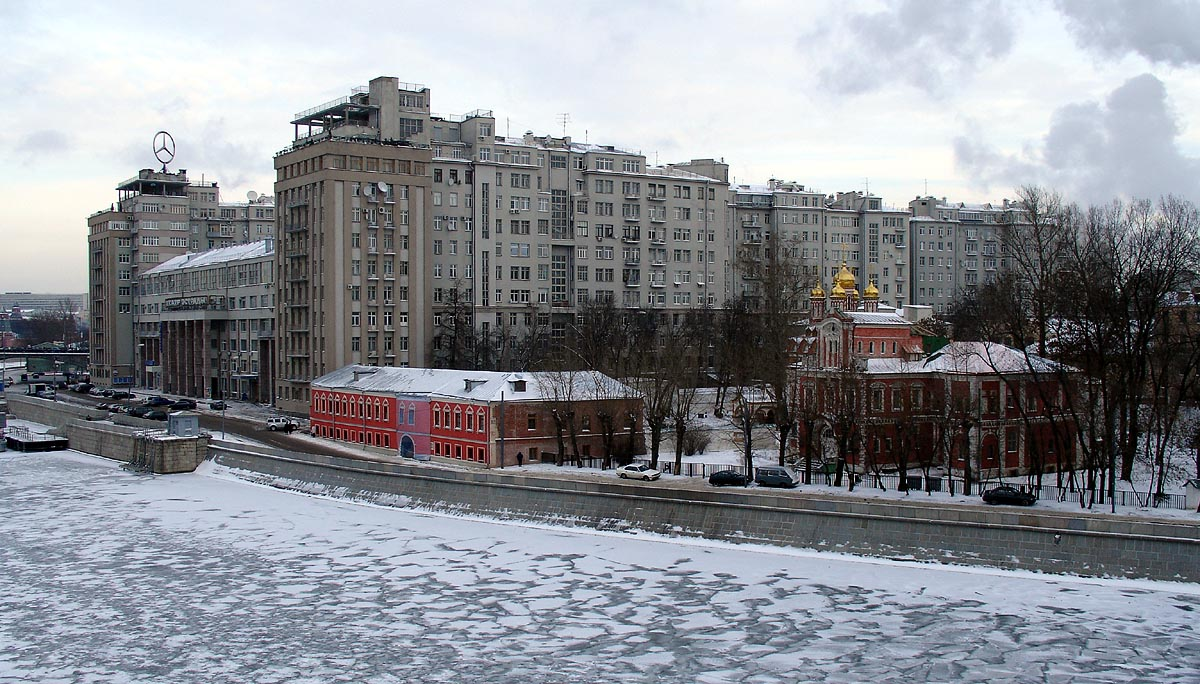
The House on the Embankment was a building completed in 1931 to house the government elite; Kosygin lived there.

Nikita Khrushchev wrote in his memoirs:

Beria and Malenkov were doing everything they could to wreck this troika of Kuznetsov, Voznesensky and Kosygin ... Many people perished in Leningrad. So did many people who had been transferred from Leningrad to work in other regions. As for Kosygin, his life was hanging by a thread ... Men who had been arrested and condemned in Leningrad made ridiculous accusations against him ... I simply can't explain how he was saved from being eliminated along with the others. Kosygin, as they say, must have drawn a lucky lottery ticket.

Kosygin told his son-in-law Mikhail Gvishiani, an NKVD officer, of the accusations leveled against Voznesensky because of his possession of firearms. Gvishiani and Kosygin threw all their weapons into a lake and searched both their own houses for any listening devices. They found one at Kosygin's house, but it might have been installed to spy on Marshal Georgy Zhukov, who had lived there before him. According to his memoirs, Kosygin never left his home without reminding his wife what to do if he did not return from work. After living two years in constant fear, the family reached the conclusion that Stalin would not harm them.

=== Khrushchev era ===
In September 1953, six months after Stalin's death, Kosygin was appointed USSR Minister for Industrial Goods, and in December he was reinstated as a Deputy Chairman of the Council of Ministers, under Malenkov, Stalin's immediate successor, but lost that position in December 1956, during Khrushchev's ascendancy, when he was appointed Deputy Chairman of the State Economic Commission. When the power struggle between Khrushchev and the so-called 'Anti-Party Group' came to a head in 1957, Kosygin backed Khrushchev because, as he said later, if Malenkov and his allies had won "blood would have flowed again", but the French journalist Michel Tatu, a close observer who was based in Moscow at the time, concluded that "Kosygin did not owe anything to Khrushchev" and that out of the post-1957 leadership "was visibly the least willing to praise the First Secretary", and that Khrushchev was "somewhat reluctant" to promote Kosygin.

However, despite Khrushchev's reluctance, Kosygin's career made a steady recovery. In June 1957, he was again appointed a Deputy Chairman of the Council of Ministers (for the third time), and a candidate member of the Presidium Central Committee (the renamed Politburo). In March 1959, he was made Chairman of Gosplan, and on 4 May 1960, he was promoted to First Deputy Chairman of the Council of Ministers, and a full member of the Presidium.

As First Deputy Premier Kosygin travelled abroad, mostly on trade missions, to countries such as North Korea, India, Argentina and Italy. Since 1959 Kosygin headed the Soviet mission to the ComEcon. Later, in the aftermath of the Cuban Missile Crisis, Kosygin was the Soviet spokesman for improved relations between the Soviet Union and the United States. According to Michel Tatu, in 1960–62, Kosygin was one of the 'big four', with Khrushchev, Frol Kozlov and Leonid Brezhnev, who would be present in the Kremlin to greet visiting leaders of East European communist parties, implying, but in November 1962, after Khrushchev complained about the management of Gosplan, and opposed Kosygin's plans for economic reform, he was removed from the inner leadership.

== Premiership ==
=== Struggle for power with Brezhnev ===
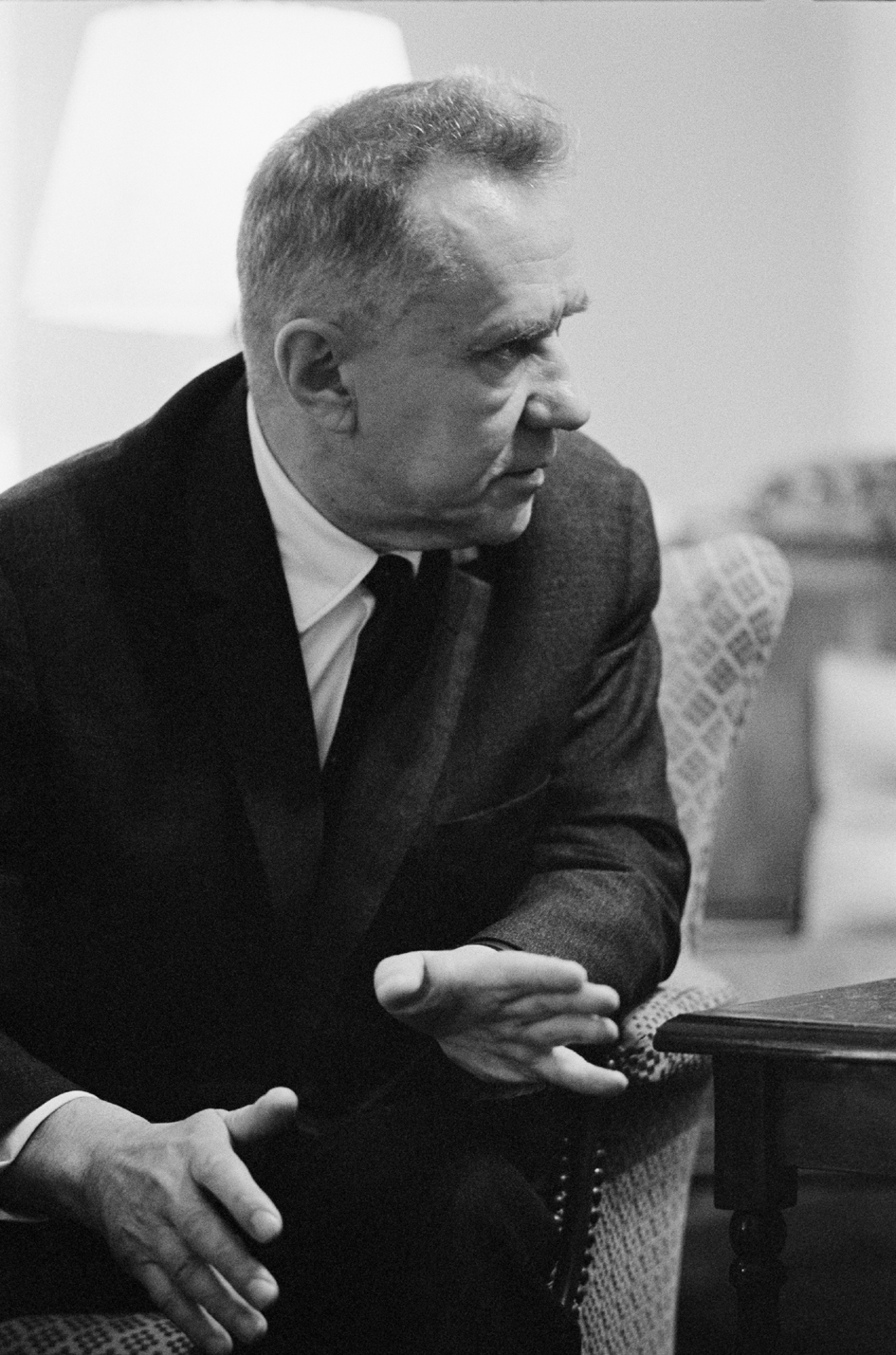
Kosygin at the Glassboro Summit Conference, 23 June 1967

When Khrushchev was removed from power in October 1964, Kosygin replaced him as Premier as part of a collective leadership dynamic that included Leonid Brezhnev as general secretary and Nikolai Podgorny who ultimately became Chairman of the Presidium. Overall, the new Politburo adopted a more conservative outlook than that under Khrushchev's rule.

Kosygin, Podgorny and Andrei Kirilenko were the most reformist members of the new Soviet leadership. Conversely, Brezhnev and Arvīds Pelše belonged to the moderate faction while Mikhail Suslov retained his leadership of the party's Stalinist wing.

In October 1964, at a ceremony in honour of Soviet cosmonauts, Brezhnev called for the strengthening of the Party apparatus. This speech was only the beginning of a large campaign directed against Kosygin. Several newspapers, such as Pravda and Kommunist, criticized the work of the Council of Ministers, and indirectly Kosygin, its chairman, for planning the economy in an unrealistic fashion, and used the highly aggressive rhetoric previously used to condemn Khrushchev against Kosygin.

Brezhnev was able to criticize Kosygin by contrasting him with Vladimir Lenin, who – Brezhnev claimed – had been more interested in improving the conditions of Soviet agriculture than improving the quality of light industrial goods. Kosygin's support for producing more consumer goods was also criticized by Brezhnev, and his supporters, most notably Konstantin Chernenko, for being a return to quasi First World policies. At the 23rd Party Congress, Kosygin's position was weakened when Brezhnev's supporters were able to increase expenditure on defense and agriculture. However, Brezhnev did not have a majority in the Politburo, and could count on only four votes. In the Politburo, Kosygin could count on Kiril Mazurov's vote, and when Kosygin and Podgorny were not bickering with each other, they actually had a majority in the Politburo over Brezhnev. Unfortunately for Kosygin this was not often the case, and Kosygin and Podgorny were constantly disagreeing on policy.

Kosygin's position in the Soviet leadership was ultimately weakened following his enactment of several economic initiatives in 1965 that collectively came to be known within the Party as the "Kosygin reforms". Due largely to coinciding with the political upheaval created by the Prague Spring, the reforms provoked a backlash among the party's old guard who proceeded to flock to Brezhnev and strengthen his position within the Soviet leadership. By March 1971, it became apparent that Brezhnev was the leader of the country, with Kosygin as the spokesman of the five-year plan and Podgorny's position within the collective leadership strengthened.

=== Foreign policy ===
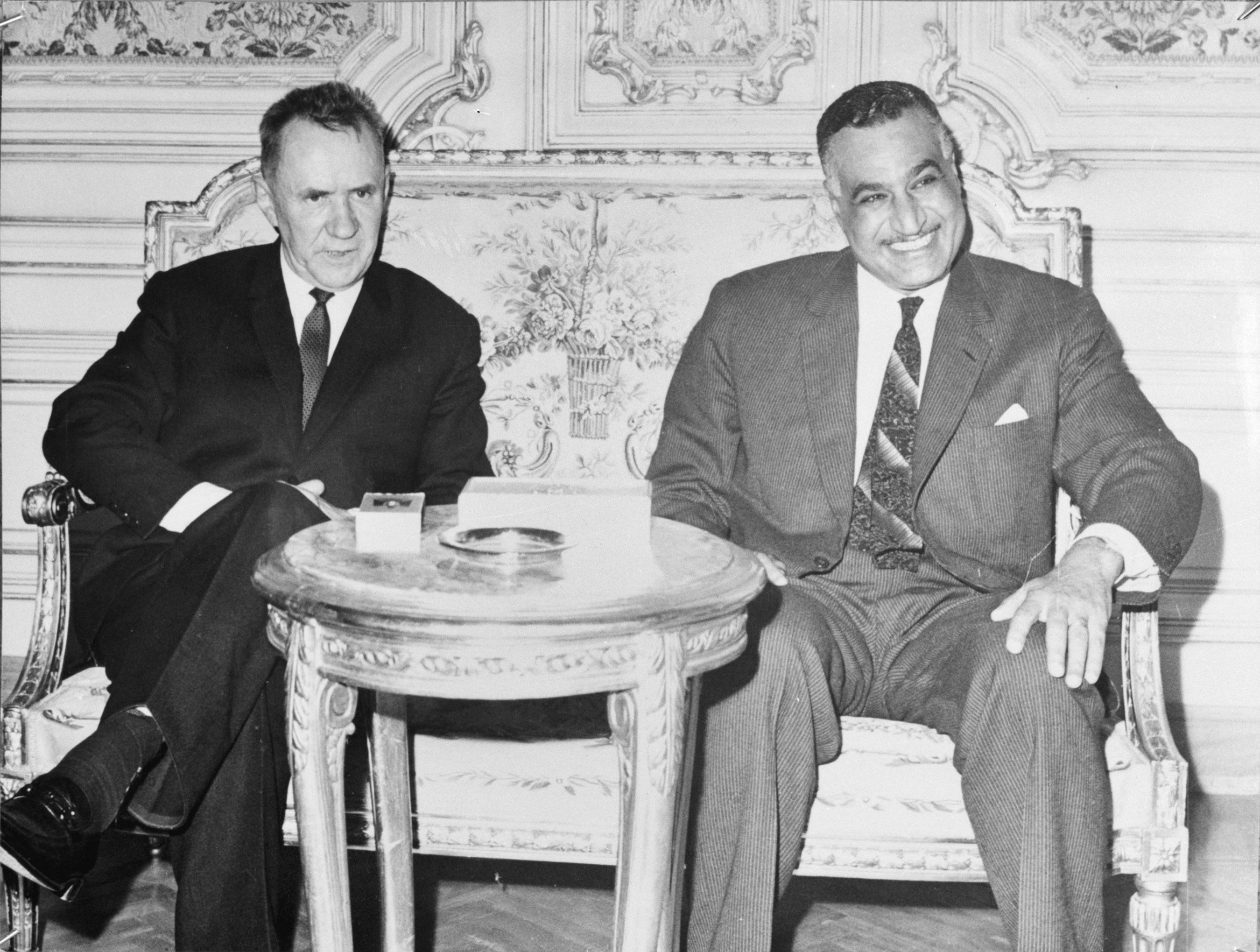
Kosygin with Egyptian President Gamal Abdel Nasser at a visit to Cairo, May 1966

Early on in his tenure, Kosygin challenged Brezhnev's right as general secretary to represent the country abroad, a function Kosygin believed should fall into the hands of the head of government, as was common in non-communist countries. This was actually implemented for a short period, which led Henry A. Kissinger to believe that Kosygin was the leader of the Soviet Union. Kosygin, who had been the chief negotiator with the First World during the 1960s, was hardly seen outside the Second World after Brezhnev consolidated his position within the Politburo, but also due to Foreign Minister Andrei Gromyko's dislike of Kosygin meddling into his own ministerial affairs.

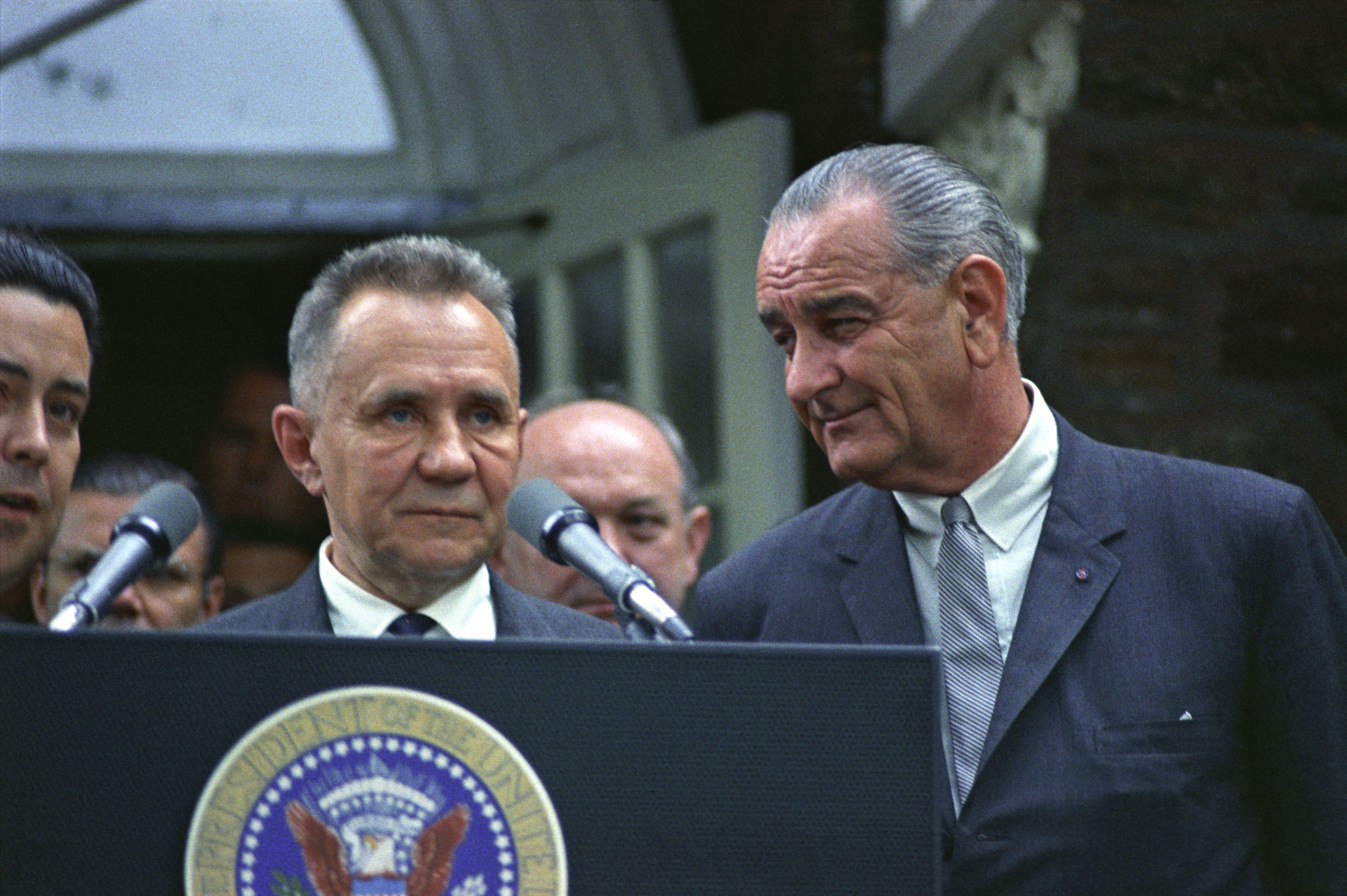
Kosygin with US President Lyndon B. Johnson at the 1967 Glassboro Summit Conference

The Six-Day War in the Middle East had the effect of increasing Soviet–American cooperation; to improve relations even further, the United States Government invited Kosygin to a summit with Lyndon B. Johnson, the President of the United States, following his speech to the United Nations. At the summit, which became known as the Glassboro Summit Conference, Johnson and Kosygin failed to reach agreement on limiting anti-ballistic missile systems, but the summit's friendly and even open atmosphere was referred to as the "Spirit of Glassboro". Relations between the two countries improved further when the 1970 Moscow Treaty was signed on 12 August 1970 by Kosygin, Gromyko, Willy Brandt and Walter Scheel who represented West Germany. In 1971, Kosygin gave an extensive interview to the American delegation that included David Rockefeller, presenting his views on US-Soviet relations, environmental protection, arms control and other issues.

Kosygin developed a close friendly relationship with the President of Finland Urho Kekkonen, which helped the USSR to maintain active mutual trade with Finland and to keep it away from Cold War confrontation.

In 1972, Kosygin signed a Treaty of Friendship and Cooperation with the government of Iraq, building on strong Soviet ties to the Iraqi Arab Socialist Ba'ath Party and previous close relations with Iraqi leader Abd al-Karim Qasim.

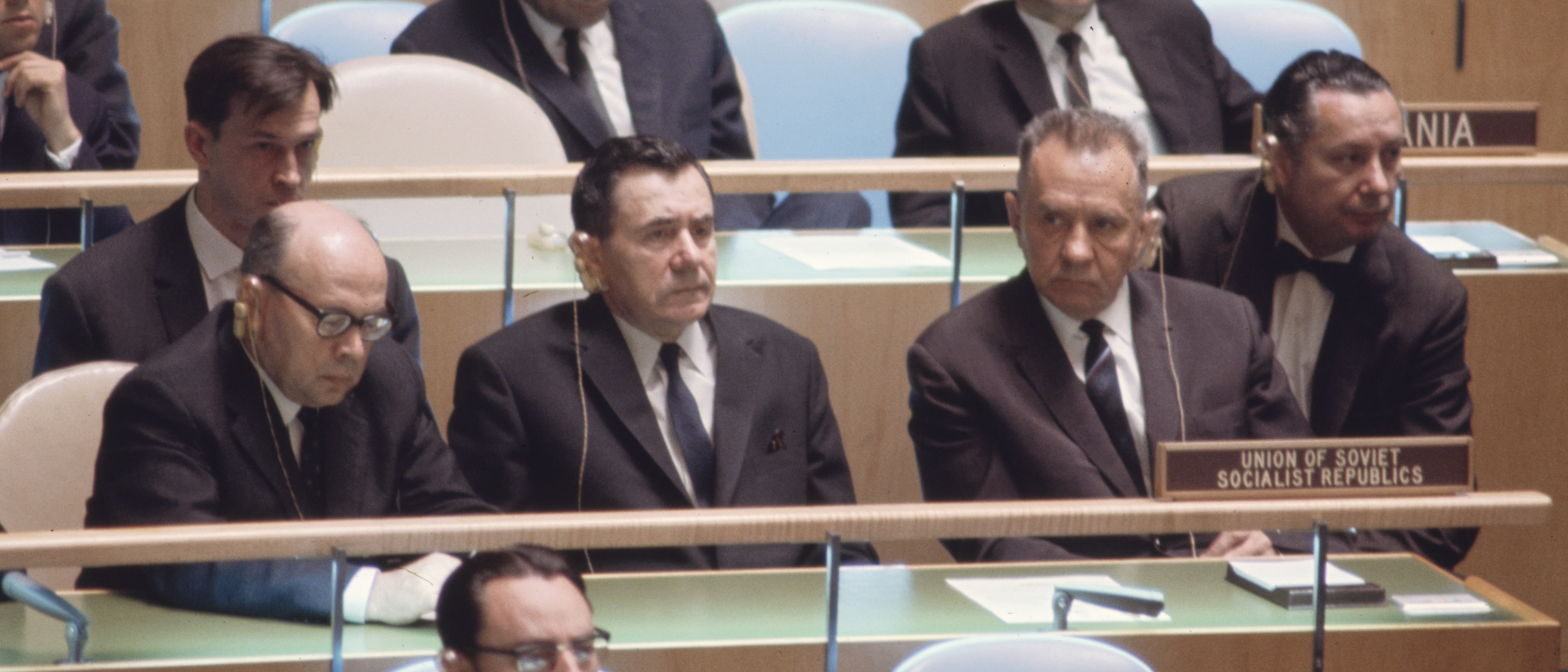
The Soviet delegation to the United Nations c. 1964–1980. Andrei Gromyko and Kosygin are second and third from left, respectively.

Kosygin protected János Kádár's economic reforms and his position as leader of the Hungarian People's Republic from intervention by the Soviet leadership. Polish leader Władysław Gomułka, who was removed from all of his posts in 1970, was succeeded by Edward Gierek who tried to revitalize the economy of the People's Republic of Poland by borrowing money from the First World. The Soviet leadership approved both countries' respective economic experiments, since it was trying to reduce its large Eastern Bloc subsidy programme in the form of cheap oil and gas exports. During the discussions within the Soviet leadership of a possible Soviet invasion of Czechoslovakia, Kosygin reminded leaders of the consequences of the Soviet suppression of the 1956 Hungarian revolution. Kosygin's stance became more aggressive later on when he understood that the reforms in Czechoslovakia could be turned against his 1965 Soviet economic reform.

Kosygin acted as a mediator between India and Pakistan in 1966, and got both nations to sign the Tashkent Declaration. Kosygin became the chief spokesman on the issue of arms control. In retrospect, many of Kosygin's colleagues felt he carried out his work "stoically", but lacked "enthusiasm", and therefore never developed a real taste for international politics.

The Sino–Soviet split chagrined Kosygin a great deal, and for a while he refused to accept its irrevocability; he briefly visited Beijing in 1969 due to increased tension between the USSR and Maoist China. Kosygin said, in a close-knit circle, that "We are communists and they are communists. It is hard to believe we will not be able to reach an agreement if we met face to face". His view on China changed, however, and according to Harold Wilson, former Prime Minister of the United Kingdom, Kosygin viewed China as an "organized military dictatorship" whose intended goal was to enslave "Vietnam and the whole of Asia".

During an official visit by an Afghan delegation, Kosygin and Andrei Kirilenko criticized Afghan leaders Nur Muhammad Taraki and Hafizullah Amin for Stalinist-like repressionist behaviour. He promised to send more economic and military aid, but rejected any proposal regarding a possible Soviet intervention, as an intervention in Afghanistan would strain the USSR's foreign relations with the First World according to Kosygin, most notably West Germany. However, in a closed meeting, without Kosygin, who strongly opposed any kind of military intervention, the Politburo unanimously supported a Soviet intervention.

=== Economic policy ===
==== Five-Year Plans ====
The Eighth Five-Year Plan (1966–1970) is considered to be one of the most successful periods for the Soviet economy and the most successful when it comes to consumer production (see The "Kosygin" reform). It became known as the "golden era". The 23rd Party Congress and the Ninth Five-Year Plan (1971–1975) had been postponed by Brezhnev due to a power struggle within the Soviet leadership. At the 23rd Party Congress, Kosygin promised that the Ninth Five-Year Plan would increase the supply of food, clothing and other household appliances up to 50 percent. The plan envisaged a massive increase in the Soviet standard of living, with Kosygin proclaiming a growth of 40 percent for the population's cash income in his speech to the congress.

The Tenth Five-Year Plan (1976–1981) was referred to by Kosygin as the "plan of quality". Brezhnev rejected Kosygin's bid for producing more consumer goods during the Tenth Five-Year Plan. As a result, the total volume of consumer goods in industrial production only stood at 26 percent. Kosygin's son-in-law notes that Kosygin was furious with the decision, and proclaimed increased defence expenditure would become the Soviet Union's "complete ruin". The plan was less ambitious than its predecessors, with targets of national industrial growth no higher than what the rest of the world had already achieved. Soviet agriculture would receive a share investment of 34 percent, a share much larger than its proportional contribution to the Soviet economy, as it accounted for only 3 percent of the Soviet GDP.

==== The "Kosygin" reform ====
Like Khrushchev, Kosygin tried to reform the command economy within a socialist framework. In 1965 Kosygin initiated an economic reform widely referred to as the "Kosygin reform". Kosygin sought to make Soviet industry more efficient by including some market measures common in the First World, such as profit making, for instance; he also tried to increase quantity of production, increase incentives for managers and workers, and freeing managers from centralized state bureaucracy. The reform had been proposed to Khrushchev in 1964, who evidently liked it and took some preliminary steps to implement it. Brezhnev allowed the reform to proceed because the Soviet economy was entering a period of low growth. In its testing phase, the reform was applied to 336 enterprises in light industry.

The reform was influenced by the works of Soviet economist Evsei Liberman. Kosygin overestimated the ability of the Soviet administrative machine to develop the economy, which led to "corrections" to some of Liberman's more controversial beliefs about decentralization. According to critics, Kosygin's changes to Liberman's original vision caused the reform to fail.

A propaganda poster promoting the reform. The poster reads: We're forging the keys of happiness.

Kosygin believed that decentralization, semi-public companies, and cooperatives were keys to catching up to the First World's contemporary level of economic growth. His reform sought a gradual change from a "state-administered economy" to an economy in which "the state restricts itself to guiding enterprises". The reform was implemented, but showed several malfunctions and inconsistencies early on.

===== Results =====
The salary for Soviet citizens increased abruptly by almost 2.5 times during the plan. Real wages in 1980 amounted to 232.7 rubles, compared to 166.3 rubles before the 1965 Soviet economic reform and the Eighth Five-Year Plan. The first period, 1960–1964, was characterized by low growth, while the second period, 1965–1981, had a stronger growth rate. The second period vividly demonstrated the success of the Kosygin reform, with the average annual growth in retail turnover being 11.2 billion rubles, 1.8 times higher than in the first period and 1.2 times higher than the third period (1981–1985). Consumption of goods and daily demand also increased. The consumption of home appliances greatly increased. Refrigerators increased from a low of 109,000 in 1964 to 440,000 units by 1973; consumption declined during the reversal of the reform. Car production increased, and would continue to do so until the late 1980s. The Soviet leadership, under pressure, sought to provide more attractive goods for Soviet consumers.

The removal of Khrushchev in 1964 signalled the end of his "housing revolution". Housing construction declined between 1960 and 1964 to an average of 1.63 million square metres. Following this sudden decrease, housing construction increased sharply between 1965 and 1966, but dropped again, and then steadily grew (the average annual growth rate was 4.26 million square metres). This came largely at the expense of businesses. While the housing shortage was never fully resolved, and still remains a problem in present-day Russia, the reform overcame the negative trend and renewed the growth of housing construction.

===== Cancellation and aftermath =====
Growing hostility towards reform, the initial poor results, and Kosygin's reformist stance, led to a popular backlash against him. Kosygin lost most of the privileges he had enjoyed before the reform, but Brezhnev was never able to remove him from the office of Chairman of the Council of Ministers, despite his weakened position. In the aftermath of his failed reform, Kosygin spent the rest of his life improving the economic administration through the modification of targets; he implemented various programmes to improve food security and ensure the future intensification of production. There is no proof to back up the claim that the reform itself contributed to the high growth seen in the late-1960s, or that its cancellation had anything to do with the stagnating growth of the economy which began in the 1970s.

==== 1973 and 1979 reforms ====
Kosygin initiated another economic reform in 1973 with the intention of weakening the central Ministries and giving more powers to the regional authorities at republican and local levels. The reform's failure to meet Kosygin's goal led to its cancellation. However, the reform succeeded in creating associations, an organization representing various enterprises. The last significant reform undertaken by the pre-perestroika leadership was initiated by Kosygin's fifth government in a joint decision of the CPSU Central Committee and the Council of Ministers. The "Improving planning and reinforcing the effects of the economic mechanism on raising the effectiveness in production and improving the quality of work", more commonly known as the 1979 reform. The reform, in contrast to the 1965 reform, was intended to increase the central government's economic involvement by enhancing the duties and responsibilities of the ministries. Due to Kosygin's resignation in 1980, and because of Nikolai Tikhonov's conservative approach to economics, very little of the reform was actually implemented.

== Later life and resignation ==
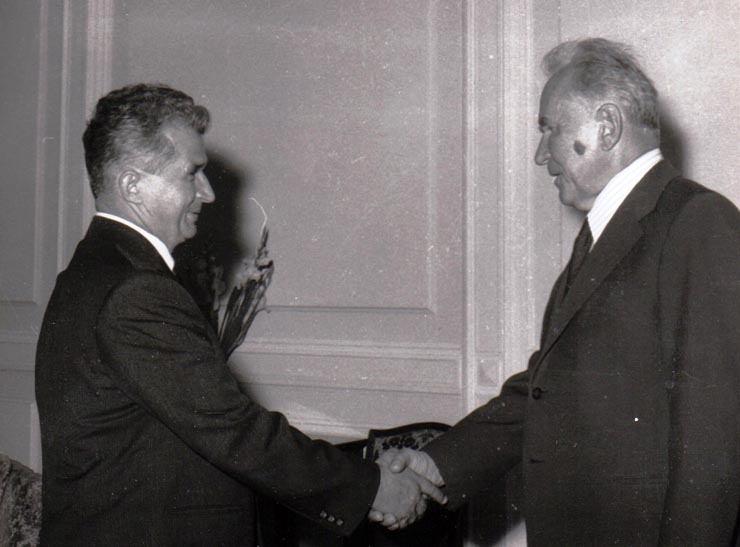
Kosygin (right) shaking hands with Romanian communist leader Nicolae Ceaușescu in 1974

By the early to mid-1970s Brezhnev had established a strong enough power base to effectively become leader. According to historian Ilya Zemtsov, the author of Chernenko: The Last Bolshevik: The Soviet Union on the Eve of Perestroika, Kosygin "began to lose power" with the 24th Party Congress in 1971, which for the first time publicized the formula 'the Politburo led by Brezhnev'". Along with weakening Kosygin's position, Brezhnev moved to strengthen the Party's hold on the Government apparatus, weakening Kosygin's position further. Historian Robert Wesson, the author of Lenin's Legacy: The Story of the CPSU, notes that Kosygin's economic report to the 25th Party Congress "pointed even more clearly to the end of struggle" between Brezhnev and Kosygin. Kosygin was further pushed aside when Brezhnev published his memoirs, which stated that Brezhnev, not Kosygin, was in charge of all major economic decisions. To make matters worse for Kosygin, Brezhnev blocked any future talks on economic reform within the party and government apparatus, and information regarding the reform of 1965 was suppressed.

Brezhnev consolidated his own position over the Government Apparatus by strengthening Podgorny's position as Chairman of the Presidium of the Supreme Soviet, literally head of state, by giving the office some of the functions of the Premier. The 1977 Soviet Constitution strengthened Podgorny's control of the Council of Ministers, by giving the post of head of state some executive powers. In fact, because of the 1977 Soviet Constitution, the Council of Ministers became subordinate to the Presidium of the Supreme Soviet. When Podgorny was replaced as head of state in 1977 by Brezhnev, Kosygin's role in day-to-day management of government activities was lessened drastically, through Brezhnev's new-found post. Rumours started circulating within the top circles, and on the streets, that Kosygin would retire due to bad health.

Brezhnev's consolidation of power weakened Kosygin's influence and prestige within the Politburo. Kosygin's position was gradually weakened during the 1970s and he was frequently hospitalized. On several occasions Kiril Mazurov, the First Deputy Chairman of the Council of Ministers, had to act on his behalf. Kosygin suffered his first heart attack in 1976. After this incident, it is said that Kosygin changed from having a vibrant personality to being tired and fed up; he, according to people close to him, seemed to have lost the will to continue his work. He twice filed a letter of resignation between 1976 and 1980, but was turned down on both occasions. During Kosygin's sick leave, Brezhnev appointed Nikolai Tikhonov to the post of First Deputy Chairman of the Council of Ministers. Tikhonov, as with Brezhnev, was a conservative, and through his post as First Deputy Chairman Tikhonov was able to reduce Kosygin to a standby role. At a Central Committee plenum in June 1980, the Soviet economic development plan was outlined by Tikhonov, not Kosygin. The powers of the Premier diminished to the point where Kosygin was forced to discuss all decisions made by the Council of Ministers with Brezhnev.

== Death ==
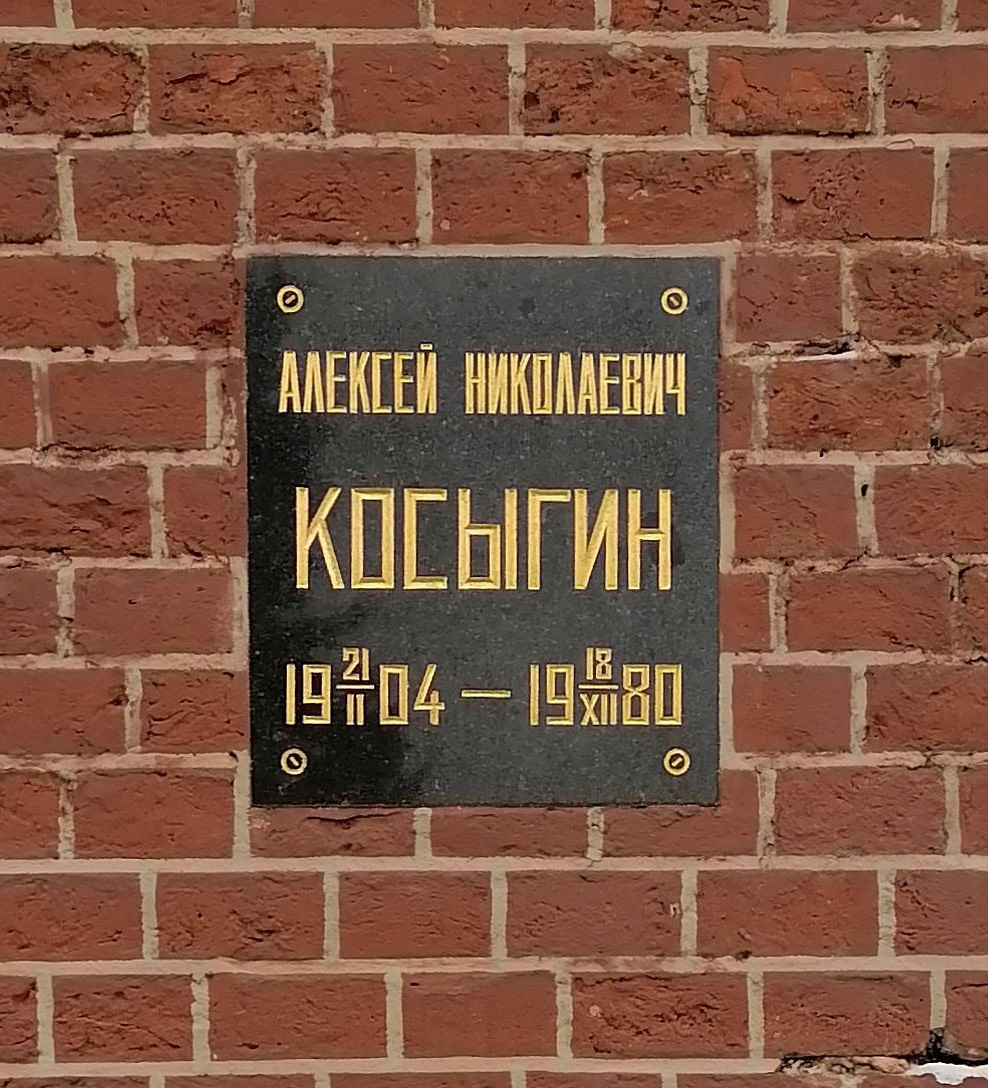
Kremlin Wall Necropolis – grave of Kosygin

Kosygin was hospitalized in October 1980. During his stay, on 23 October, he wrote a brief letter of resignation; the following day he was deprived of all government protection, communication, and luxury goods he had earned during his political life. When Kosygin died on 18 December 1980 in Moscow, none of his Politburo colleagues, former aides, or security guards visited him. At the end of his life, Kosygin feared the complete failure of the Eleventh Five-Year Plan (1981–1985), saying that the sitting leadership was reluctant to reform the stagnant Soviet economy. His funeral was postponed for three days, as Kosygin died on the eve of Brezhnev's birthday, and the day of Stalin's. Kosygin was praised by Brezhnev as an individual who "laboured selflessly for the good of the Soviet state". A state funeral was conducted and Kosygin was honoured by his peers; Brezhnev, Yuri Andropov, and Tikhonov laid an urn containing his ashes at the Kremlin Wall Necropolis.

== Personality ==
Compared with other Soviet officials, Kosygin stood out as a pragmatic and relatively independent leader. In a description given by an anonymous high-ranking GRU official, Kosygin is described as "a lonely and somewhat tragic figure" who "understood our faults and the shortcomings of our situation in general and those in our Middle East policy in particular, but, being a highly restrained man, he preferred to be cautious." An anonymous former colleague of Kosygin said "He always had an opinion of his own, and defended it. He was a very alert man, and performed brilliantly during negotiations. He was able to cope quickly with the material that was totally new to him. I have never seen people of that calibre since."

Canadian Prime Minister Pierre Trudeau said Kosygin was like "Khrushchev without the rough edges, a fatherly man who was the forerunner of Mikhail Gorbachev". He noted that Kosygin was willing to discuss issues so long as the Soviet position was not tackled head-on. Former United States Secretary of State Henry Kissinger said that Kosygin was devoted, nearly fanatically, to his work. Kosygin was viewed by Western diplomats as a pragmatist "with a glacial exterior who was orthodox if not rigid". Andrei Sakharov, a Soviet dissident, believed Kosygin to be "the most intelligent and toughest man in the Politburo". Singapore Prime Minister Lee Kuan Yew remembered Kosygin as "very quiet-spoken, but very determined, mind of great ability and application". US economist David Rockefeller described Kosygin as a talented manager doing miracles in ruling the clumsy Soviet economy.

== Legacy ==
=== Historical assessments ===
Kosygin would prove to be a very competent administrator, with the Soviet standard of living rising considerably due to his moderately reformist policy. Kosygin's moderate 1965 reform, as with Nikita Khrushchev's thaw, radicalized the Soviet reform movement. While Leonid Brezhnev was content to maintain the centralized structure of the Soviet planned economy, Kosygin attempted to revitalize the ailing economic system by decentralising management. Following Brezhnev's death in 1982, the reform movement was split between Yuri Andropov's path of discipline and control and Gorbachev's liberalization of all aspects of public life.

Chernenko: The Last Bolshevik: The Soviet Union on the Eve of Perestroika author Ilya Zemtsov describes Kosygin as "determined and intelligent, an outstanding administrator" and claims he distinguished himself from the other members of the Soviet leadership with his "extraordinary capacity for work". Moshe Lewin, in The Soviet Century, described him as a "phenomenal administrator". "His strength", David Law writes, was "his exceptional capability as an administrator". According to Law Kosygin proved himself to be a "competent politician" also. Historians Evan Mawdsley and Stephen White claim that Brezhnev was unable to remove Kosygin because his removal would mean the loss of his last "capable administrator". In their book, The Unknown Stalin, Roy Medvedev and Zhores Medvedev called Kosygin an "outstanding organizer", and the "new Voznesensky". Historian Archie Brown, the author of The Rise & Fall of Communism, believes the 1965 Soviet economic reform to have been too "modest", and claimed that Kosygin "was too much a product of the Soviet ministerial system, as it evolved under Stalin, to become a radical economic reformer". However, Brown does believe that Kosygin was "an able administrator". Gvishiani, a Russian historian, concluded that "Kosygin survived both Stalin and Khrushchev, but did not manage to survive Brezhnev."

Kosygin was viewed with sympathy by the Soviet people, and is still presently viewed as an important figure in both Russian and Soviet history. Because of Kosygin's popularity among the Soviet people, Brezhnev developed a "strong jealousy" for Kosygin, according to Nikolai Egorychev. Mikhail Smirtyukov, the former Executive Officer of the Council of Ministers, recalled that Kosygin refused to go drinking with Brezhnev, a move which annoyed Brezhnev gravely. Nikolai Ryzhkov, the last Chairman of the Council of Ministers, in a speech to the Supreme Soviet of the Soviet Union in 1987 referred to the "sad experiences of the 1965 reform", and claimed that everything went from bad to worse following the reform's cancellation.

== Honours ==
During his lifetime, Kosygin received seven Orders and two Awards from the Soviet state. He was awarded two Hero of Socialist Labour (USSR); one being on his 60th birthday by the Presidium of the Supreme Soviet in 1964, on this occasion he was also awarded an Order of Lenin and a Hammer and Sickle Gold Medal. On 20 February 1974, to commemorate his 70th birthday, the Presidium of the Supreme Soviet awarded him another Order of Lenin and his second Hammer and Sickle Gold Medal. In total, Kosygin was awarded six Orders of Lenin by the Soviet state, and one Order of the October Revolution and one Order of the Red Banner of Labour. During a state visit to Peru in the 1970s with Leonid Brezhnev and Andrei Gromyko, all three were awarded the Grand Cross of the Order of the Sun by President Francisco Morales Bermúdez. The Moscow State Textile University was named in his honour in 1981, in 1982 a bust to honour Kosygin was placed in Leningrad, present-day Saint Petersburg. In 2006 the Russian Government renamed a street after him.

=== Foreign honours ===
- Bangladesh Liberation War Honour (Bangladesh Muktijuddho Sanmanona)

== Sources ==
- Brown, Archie (2009). The Rise & Fall of Communism. London: Bodley Head. ISBN 978-0-224-07879-5.
- Brown, Archie, ed. (1990). The Soviet Union: A Biographical Dictionary. London, United Kingdom: George Weidenfeld and Nicolson Ltd. ISBN 0-297-82010-9.
- Bacon, Edwin; Sandle, Mark (2002). Brezhnev Reconsidered. Palgrave Macmillan. ISBN 978-0333794630.
- Bothwell, Robert; Granatstein, J. L. (1991). Pirouette: Pierre Trudeau and Canadian Foreign Policy. University of Toronto Press. ISBN 978-0802057808.
- Central Asian Research Centre (1979). USSR and Third World. Vol. 8. Indiana University: Central Asian Research Centre.
- Chauhan, Sharad (2004). Inside CIA: Lessons in Intelligence. APH Publishing. ISBN 9788176486606.
- Colman, Jonathan (2004). A 'special relationship'?: Harold Wilson, Lyndon B. Johnson and Anglo-American relations 'at the summit', 1964–68. Manchester University Press. ISBN 0719070104.
- Coughlin, Con (2005). Saddam: His Rise and Fall. Harper Perennial. ISBN 978-0060505431.
- Daniels, Robert Vincent (1993). A Documentary history of Communism in Russia: from Lenin to Gorbachev (3rd ed.). UPNE. ISBN 978-0874516166.
- Daniels, Robert Vincent (2004). The End of the Communist Revolution. Taylor & Francis. ISBN 9780203413289. OCLC 1033575049.
- Dannenberg, Julia von (2008). The Foundations of Ostpolitik: The Making of the Moscow Treaty between West Germany and the USSR. Oxford University Press. ISBN 978-0199228195.
- Dellenbrant, Jan Åke (1986). The Soviet Regional Dilemma: Planning, People, and Natural Resources. M.E. Sharpe. ISBN 978-0873323840.
- Lewin, Moshe (2005). Elliott, Gregory (ed.). The Soviet Century. London; New York: Verso Books. ISBN 978-1844670161.
- Ellman, Michael (1989). Socialist Planning (2nd ed.). Cambridge University Press Archive. ISBN 978-0521358668.
- Gibbons, William (1995). The U.S. Government and the Vietnam War: Executive and Legislative Roles and Relationships, Part IV: July 1965 – January 1968. Princeton University Press. ISBN 978-0691006352.
- Harrison, Selig S.; Cordovez, Diego (1995). Out of Afghanistan: the Inside Story of the Soviet Withdrawal. New York: Oxford University Press. ISBN 978-0195062946.
- Law, David A. (1975). Russian Civilization. New York: Ardent Media. ASIN B003RXSA90.
- Mawdsley, Evan; White, Stephen (2000). The Soviet Elite from Lenin to Gorbachev: The Central Committee and Its Members, 1917–1991. Oxford University Press. ISBN 978-0198297383.
- McCauley, Martin (1993). The Soviet Union 1917–1991. Longman. ISBN 0582-01323-2.
- Medvedev, Roy; Medvedev, Zhores (2006). The Unknown Stalin. London: I.B. Tauris. ISBN 978-1585675029.
- Moss, Walter (2005). A History of Russia: Since 1855. London: Anthem Press. ISBN 978-1-84331-034-1.
- Pearson, Raymond (1998). The Rise and Fall of the Soviet Empire. MacMillan Press Ltd. ISBN 978-0-333-60628-5.
- Ploss, Sidney (2010). The Roots of Perestroika: The Soviet Breakdown in Historical Context. McFarland & Company. ISBN 978-0786444861.
- Robbins, James (2010). This Time We Win: Revisiting the Tet Offensive. Encounter Books. ISBN 978-1594032295.
- Rutland, Peter (1985). The Myth of the Plan: Lessons of Soviet Planning Experience. Taylor & Francis. ISBN 978-0812690057.
- Safire, William (1988). Before the Fall: An Inside View of the Pre-Watergate White House. Da Capo Press. ISBN 978-0-306-80334-5.
- Saikal, Amin (2006). Modern Afghanistan: a History of Struggle and Survival. I.B. Tauris. ISBN 978-1850434375.
- Service, Robert (2009). The Penguin History of Modern Russia: From Tsarism to the Twenty-first Century (3rd ed.). Penguin Books Ltd. ISBN 978-0141037974.
- Society for Contemporary Studies (1979). The Contemporary. Vol. 23. New Delhi: R.N. Guha Thakurta for Contemporary Journals Ltd. OCLC 1606812.
- van Dijk, Ruud (2008). Encyclopedia of the Cold War. Vol. 2 (1st ed.). Routledge. ISBN 978-0415975155.
- Tatu, Michel (1969). Power in the Kremlin: from Khrushchev to Kosygin. New York: Viking Press. ISBN 9780670570287.
- Wesson, Robert G. (1978). Lenin's Legacy: The Story of the CPSU. Stanford, Calif: Hoover Press. ISBN 978-0817969226.
- Zemtsov, Ilya (1989). Chernenko: The Last Bolshevik: The Soviet Union on the Eve of Perestroika. Transaction Publishers. ISBN 978-0887382604.
- Zubok, Vladislav Martinovich (2007). A Failed Empire: the Soviet Union in the Cold War from Stalin to Gorbachev. UNC Press. ISBN 978-0807830987.

Political offices
Preceded by Nikita Khrushchev	Chairman of the Council of Ministers; 1964–1980	Succeeded by Nikolai Tikhonov
Preceded by Frol Kozlov	First Deputy Chairman of the Council of Ministers; 1960–1964	Succeeded by Dmitriy Ustinov
Preceded by Joseph Kuzmin	Chairman of the State Planning Committee; 1959–1960	Succeeded by Vladimir Novikov
Preceded by Arseny Zverev	Minister of Finance; 1948	Succeeded by Arseny Zverev
Preceded by Ivan Khokhlov	Chairman of the Council of People's Commissars of the Russian SFSR; 1943–1946	Succeeded by Mikhail Rodionov
Preceded by —	Minister of Consumer Goods; 1953–1954	Succeeded by Nikita Ryzhov
Preceded by —	Minister of Light and Food Industry; 1948–1953	Succeeded by —
Preceded by Nikolai Tshesnokov	Minister of Light Industry; 1948–1953	Succeeded by —
Party political offices
Preceded by —	Member of the Politburo; 1960–1980	Succeeded by —
Preceded by —	Candidate Member of the Presidium; 1952–1953	Succeeded by —
Preceded by —	Member of the Presidium; 1948–1952	Succeeded by —
Preceded by —	Candidate Member of the Politburo; 1948	Succeeded by —
Preceded by —	Member of the Central Committee; 1939–1980	Succeeded by —
