= Eleventh Five-Year Plan =

Eleventh Five-Year Plan may refer to:

- The Eleventh five-year plan (China), began in 2006 and ended in 2010
- The Eleventh Five-Year Plan (India), began in 2007 and ended in 2012
- The Eleventh five-year plan (Soviet Union), began in 1981 and ended in 1985
