= Eleventh five-year plan (Soviet Union) =

Economic period

The eleventh five-year plan of the Union of Soviet Socialist Republics (USSR) was a set of goals designed to strengthen the country's economy between 1981 and 1985. The plan was presented by the Chairman of the Council of Ministers Nikolai Tikhonov at the 26th Congress of the Communist Party of the Soviet Union (CPSU).

== The 26th Congress ==
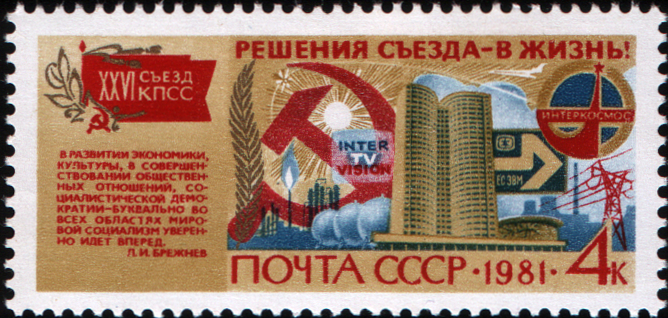
A Soviet stamp devoted to the 26th Party Congress

In his speech to the 26th Congress of the Communist Party of the Soviet Union (CPSU), Leonid Brezhnev told the delegates that the main goal of the eleventh five-year plan was to transition the Soviet economy from extensive to intensive growth, and to further improve the standard of living by 18–20 percent by 1985. He also told the Congress that the 1979 economic reform, initiated by Alexei Kosygin, would be of major importance to the five-year plan's success. Other goals were halting migration from East to West and South to North as well as ensuring economic growth. By 1981 the majority of Soviet economic centers were located in underdeveloped areas, such as Siberia and Central Asia. According to the Soviet government, the solution was to reduce social differences in the republics, oblasts and sub-regional units—in Brezhnev's words to establish an "effective demographic policy". However, according to the Soviet government, the socioeconomic development of the Soviet Republics had been evened out due to the altruism of the Russian people, such that developmental differences between republics were no longer a problem.

Nikolai Tikhonov, the Chairman of the Council of Ministers, told the Congress that industrial output would grow by an estimated 26-28 percent during the five-year plan and capital investment by between 12–15 percent over the preceding plan. Tikhonov criticised what he saw as inefficiencies within the planned economy, placing most of the blame on low labour productivity, which as a result was targeted to grow by 23–25 percent, an increase of 6–8 percent over the preceding plan. "The basic guidelines for the USSR's economic and social development in 1981–85 and the period up to 1990", an economic plan proposed by Tikhonov, was adopted by the Congress. The five key points of Tikhonov's economic plan were:

1. Growth in the eastern regions to be accelerated.
2. Labour reserves of Central Asia to be better utilised, with training of a well-educated workforce improved.
3. Modernisation of enterprises in Soviet Europe and existing resources put to better use.
4. Territorial production complexes put to better use.
5. An increase in the Soviet's role in oversight of the planned economy.

In his presentation to the congress, Tikhonov admitted that Soviet agriculture had failed to produce enough grain. He called for improvements in Soviet–US relations, but dismissed all speculation that the Soviet economy was in any sort of crisis. However, he went on to admit that there were economic "shortcomings" and acknowledged the ongoing "food problem". Other topics for discussion were the need to save energy resources and to improve the quality of Soviet produced goods.

== Fulfillment ==
By the 1980s the Soviet economy had stagnated, with the natural gas industry the only Soviet fuel industry to surpass the five-year plan's indicators. During the five year plan period, energy production accounted for two-thirds of Soviet capital spending. Although 40,000 robots were produced during the plan, advances in computer technology decreased. At the end of his life, former Premier Alexei Kosygin feared the complete failure of this five-year plan, claiming that the incumbent leadership were reluctant to reform the stagnant Soviet economy. None of the Soviet Far East oblasts fulfilled the five-year plan's housing targets.

By the 1960s, the goal of increasing the labour surplus had become a major obstacle, caused by factors including the declining birth rate. Labour growth had also stagnated with working population growth remaining at 18 percent between 1971 and 1980. The table below uses the planner's targets as a base for comparison with actual increases in industrial growth due to labour productivity.

Year	% growth achieved
Eleventh five-year plan	90
1981	62
1982	61
1983	80
1984	93

According to Nikolai Ryzhkov, the Soviet Premier at the 27th Party Congress, the eleventh five-year plan had not been able meet the USSR's fuel requirements.

== See also ==
- Five-year plans of the Soviet Union
  - First five-year plan (Soviet Union)
  - Ninth five-year plan (Soviet Union)
  - Tenth five-year plan (Soviet Union)

Preceded by Tenth plan 1976 – 1981	Eleventh five-year plan 1981 – 1985	Succeeded by Twelfth plan 1986 – 1990
