= Tenth Five-Year Plan =

Tenth Five-Year Plan may refer to:

- The Tenth Five-Year Plan (People's Republic of China), began in 2001 and ended in 2005
- The Tenth Five-Year Plan (India), began in 2002 and ended in 2007
- The Tenth Five-Year Plan (Soviet Union), began in 1976 and ended in 1980
