= Tenth five-year plan (Soviet Union) =

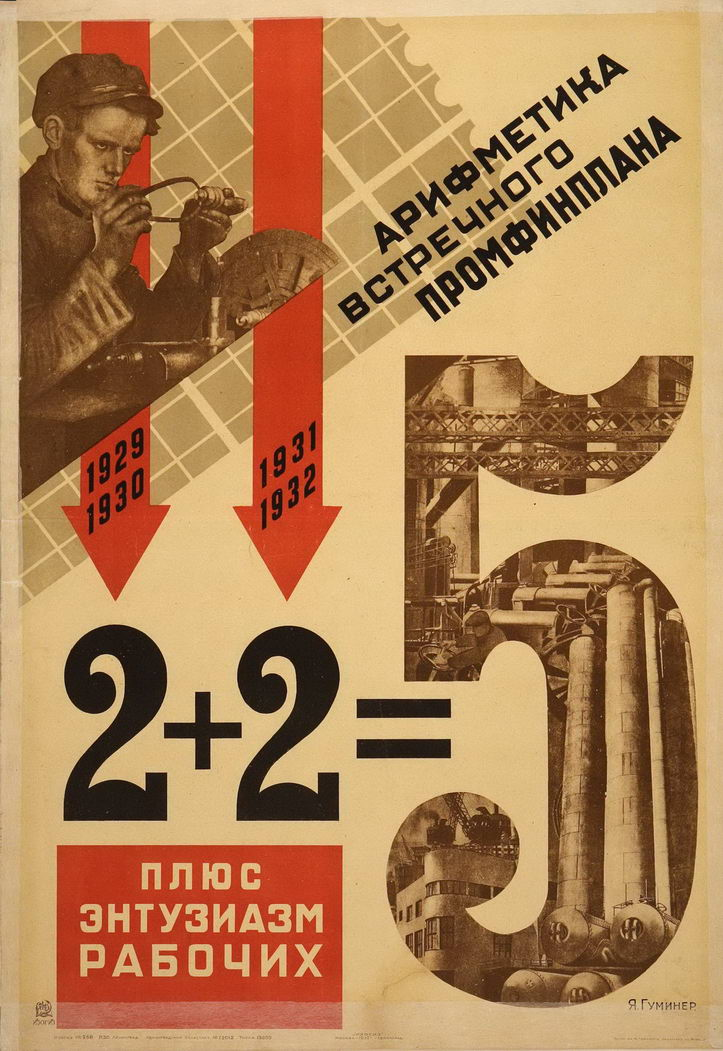
Soviet propaganda poster from the early 1930s by Yakov Guminer, promoting the "counter-plan" movement during the first five-year plan (1928-1932)

The tenth five-year plan of the Union of Soviet Socialist Republics (USSR), was a set of goals designed to strengthen the country's economy between 1976 and 1980. The plan was presented by the Chairman of the Council of Ministers Alexei Kosygin at the 25th Congress of the Communist Party of the Soviet Union (CPSU). Officially the plan was normally referred to as "The Plan of Quality and Efficiency".

== The 25th Congress and development ==
Alexei Kosygin, Chairman of the Council of Ministers presented the plan at the 25th Congress of the Communist Party of the Soviet Union (CPSU) in 1976. General Secretary Leonid Brezhnev told the Central Committee (CC) in an annual address in October 1976 that "Efficiency and quality" was to become the plan's official motto. Brezhnev claimed that the Soviet economy faced declining growth due to slow technological progress at home hence the plan emphasised the need to buy foreign technology. Soviet agriculture was given top priority in the plan, with Brezhnev stating that investment in agriculture (at 27 percent during the tenth five-year plan) must stay close to at least the same level during the eleventh five-year plan as it did during the tenth. Investment in chemical and petrochemical industry doubled in the tenth five-year plan in comparison with its predecessor.

It was reported that the Political Bureau (Politburo) rejected the draft of the tenth five-year plan twice because it demanded too little growth in the consumer goods sector of the economy.

Republic	Growth in industrial output in percent (according to the USSR)		
Republic	Outcome 9th Plan	Planned 10th Plan	Outcome 10th Plan
Soviet Union	43%	36%	24%
Armenia	45%	46%	46%
Azerbaijan	50%	39%	47%
Byelorussia	64%	43%	42%
Estonia	41%	26%	24%
Georgia	39%	41%	40%
Kazakhstan	42%	40%	18%
Kirghizia	52%	37%	30%
Latvia	36%	27%	20%
Lithuania	49%	32%	26%
Moldavia	55%	47%	32%
Russia	42%	36%	22%
Tajikistan	39%	39%	30%
Turkmenistan	54%	30%	12%
Ukraine	41%	33%	21%
Uzbekistan	39%	39%	30%

Brezhnev had proposed in March 1974 that the two major projects in the plan would be (1) construction of the Baikal Amur Mainline railway in Siberia, and (2) rural development of the backward non-chernozem zone of European Russia.

== Fulfillment ==
During the term of the plan, renovation of enterprises in the oil refining industry made up two-thirds of national capital investment. Due to the Soviet government's emphasis on technological innovation, 10–12 percent of the total investment in machinery and equipment was spent on foreign imported technology. Licensed purchases from the West increased dramatically, with the number of import of licenses issued quadrupling during the tenth five-year plan compared to the previous five-year plan. According to a report entitled Oil Supplementary by the Central Intelligence Agency (CIA), the USSR would not fulfill its annual output target of 640 million tons of oil. Planned increases in labour productivity also failed to materialise.

Contemporary Soviet statistics show that plan fulfillment was higher in the European part of the USSR and the Caucasus than in Central Asia. All Central Asian republics fell short of plan targets. For example, in the Turkmen Soviet Socialist Republic (TSSR) the planned industrial growth was 30 percent, while it grew only by 12 percent in the five years. As seen in the adjacent table, only the Armenian SSR and the Azerbaijan SSR out of the fifteen republics fulfilled planned industrial output, while only two republics increased theirs (the Armenian SSR and the Georgian SSR). Semion Grossu, the First Secretary of the Communist Party of Moldova, blamed "fundamental flaws in economic activity" which made it close to impossible to fulfill the plan's criteria. The Baikal Amur Mainline railway in Siberia was officially finished in 1984, but was not fully completed until 1991.

The 1979 Soviet economic reform, or "Improving planning and reinforcing the effects of the economic mechanism on raising the effectiveness in production and improving the quality of work", was an economic reform initiated by Alexei Kosygin. In contrast with many of his earlier reform initiatives, such as the 1965 economic reform, which successfully centralised the economy by enhancing the powers of the ministries, this reform failed to fulfill the rest of the tenth five-year plan.

== See also ==
- Five-year plans of the Soviet Union
  - First five-year plan (Soviet Union)
  - Ninth five-year plan (Soviet Union)
  - Eleventh five-year plan (Soviet Union)

Preceded by 9th Plan; 1971 – 1975	10th Five-Year Plan; 1975 – 1980	Succeeded by 11th Plan; 1981 – 1985
