= 24th Congress of the Communist Party of the Soviet Union =

1971 meeting of Soviet delegates

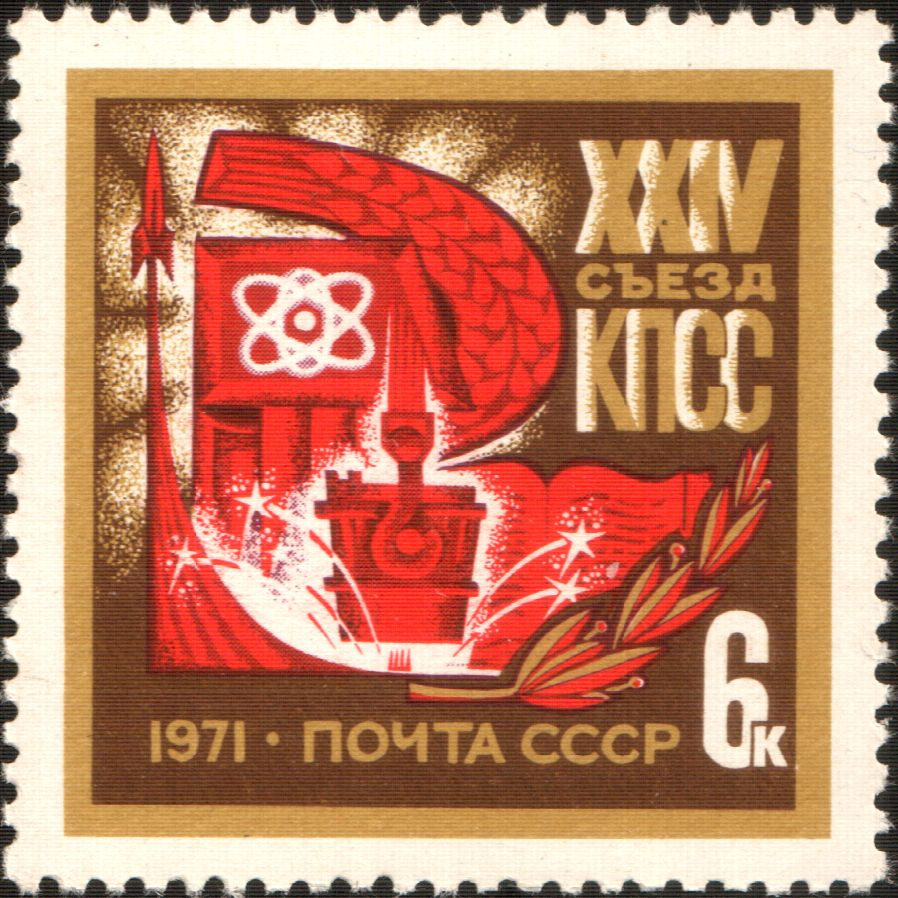
1971 USSR Postal Stamp, celebrating the 24th Congress

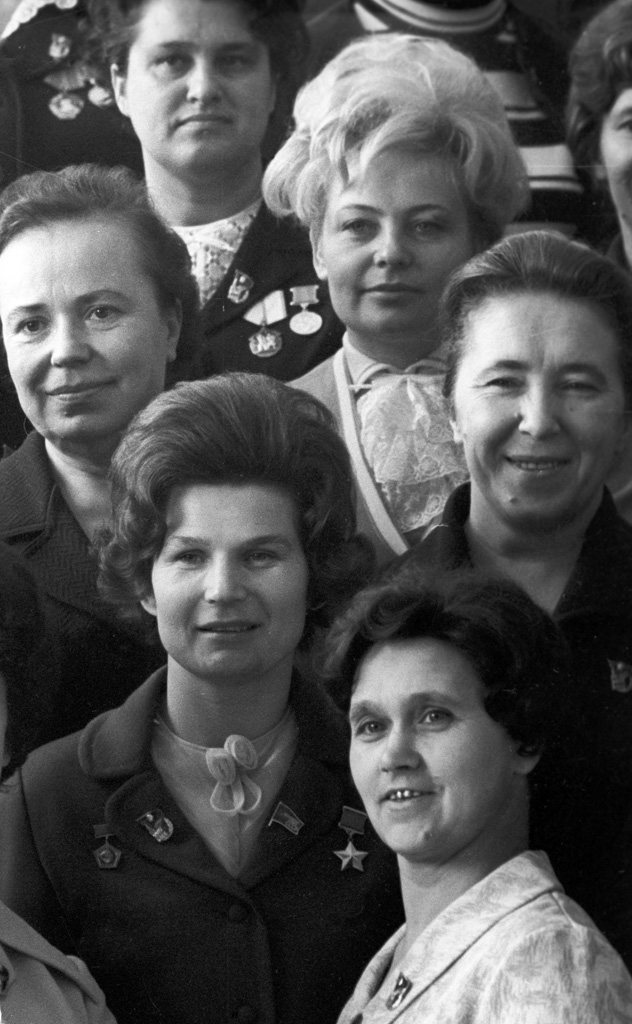
Valentina Tereshkova, bottom left, with delegates at the 24th CPSU Congress

The 24th Congress of the Communist Party of the Soviet Union (CPSU) was convened in Moscow from 30 March to 9 April 1971. The Congress brought together 4,963 delegates, with 102 foreign delegations from 91 countries as observers.

== Agenda ==
The Congress agenda consisted of:

1. The Report of the CPSU Central Committee delivered by General Secretary Leonid Brezhnev.
2. The Report of the Central Auditing Commission of the CPSU delivered by G. Sizov, Chairman of the Auditing Commission.
3. The Report on the Directives for the Five-Year Economic Development Plan of the USSR for 1971-1975 delivered by A. Kosygin, Chairman of the USSR Council of Ministers.
4. Elections of central Party organs.

The 24th Congress was to have authorized implementation of Victor Glushkov's OGAS information network plan, but ultimately endorsed only expansion of local information management systems.
