= Eighth five-year plan (Soviet Union) =

The eighth five-year plan of the Union of Soviet Socialist Republics (USSR) was a set of production goals and guidelines for administering the economy from 1966 to 1970—part of a series of such plans used by the USSR from 1928 until its dissolution. "Directives" for the plan involved set high goals for industrial production, especially in vehicles and appliances. These directives for the eighth five-year plan were approved by the Central Committee of the Communist Party of the Soviet Union and by the 23rd Congress of the Communist Party of the Soviet Union, but no final version was apparently ever ratified by the Supreme Soviet of the Soviet Union. Nevertheless, some of the changes envisioned were made.

== Themes ==
The eighth five-year plan called for various changes in the administration of the economy. Some planning was re-centralized, reversing a policy for regional councils created in 1957. But individual plant directors gained more power to set policy. The plan implemented economic reforms announced in 1965, which linked wages more closely to output. Given the significant economic transition envisioned by these reforms, and their greater emphasis on economic realism, the eighth five-year plan set relatively modest production goals.

Introducing the plan at the 23rd Congress, Premier Alexei Kosygin said the USSR would repudiate "subjectivism in deciding economic matters as amateurish contempt for the data of science and practical experience". He focused on the plan's potential to improve quality of life for individuals, saying, "Comrades! Construction of communism and improvement in people's welfare are inseparable. Along these lines, Kosygin promised higher wages, lower prices on consumer goods, and a shift to a five-day work week. The plan set the stage for wider distribution of things like television sets, refrigerators, and washing machines.

Although unemployment had been officially abolished, there were in fact people without jobs in regions such as Tajikistan, Moldavia, Moscow oblast, Mari Autonomous Republic, and Uzbekistan, and one purpose of the plan was to create new work projects in these areas. (The policy of no unemployment had also led to "superfluous workers" assigned non-essential jobs in various factories.)

Kosygin reaffirmed the need for military spending, which he said was necessary in response to the imperialist wars of the United States.

This plan abandoned the slogan "Overtake and surpass the U.S.A.".

== Production goals ==
The biggest change in quotas came in the sector of vehicles, which were scheduled for production at three times the rate specified in the previous plan. Whereas Soviet vehicle factories had formerly favored trucks and buses, the 1966 plan called for production of passenger cars (such as the Moskvitch 408) to increase to 53% of the total. The increased production of vehicles would be made possible with outside technical assistance—most notably from Fiat, in the construction of the AvtoVAZ plant in Togliatti.

The plan also called for agricultural output to expand more than twice as fast, annually, as it did from 1958 to 1965, for a total increase in output of 25%.

The budget for the plan was 310,000,000,000 rubles, the allocation for which was specified in less detail than previously.

== Approval process ==
Directives for the Plan were approved by the 23rd Congress of the Communist Party of the Soviet Union, which convened 37 days after a draft of the directives was published. The Directives were then referred to Gosplan, the USSR's central planning agency, for elaboration into the official five-year plan.

Ratification of the plan by the Supreme Soviet was delayed several times. By September 1967, no mention was made of the five-year plan and instead the Central Committee individual plans for 1968, 1969, and 1970. The wage reforms outlined in 1965, were, it was reported, implemented in Soviet factories during the course of the year 1966. The plan for 1968 included a 15% increase in military spending.

During the failed approval process, the goals of the plan were reduced twice.

Technically, the eighth five-year plan was the seventh five-year plan: there was no seventh five-year plan, as the sixth five-year plan was interrupted in 1959 by the "seven-year plan".

Preceded by Seven-Year Plan; 1959–1965	Eighth five-year plan 1966–1970	Succeeded by Ninth five-year plan
