= First five-year plan (Soviet Union) =

Economic policy of the Soviet Union from 1928 to 1932

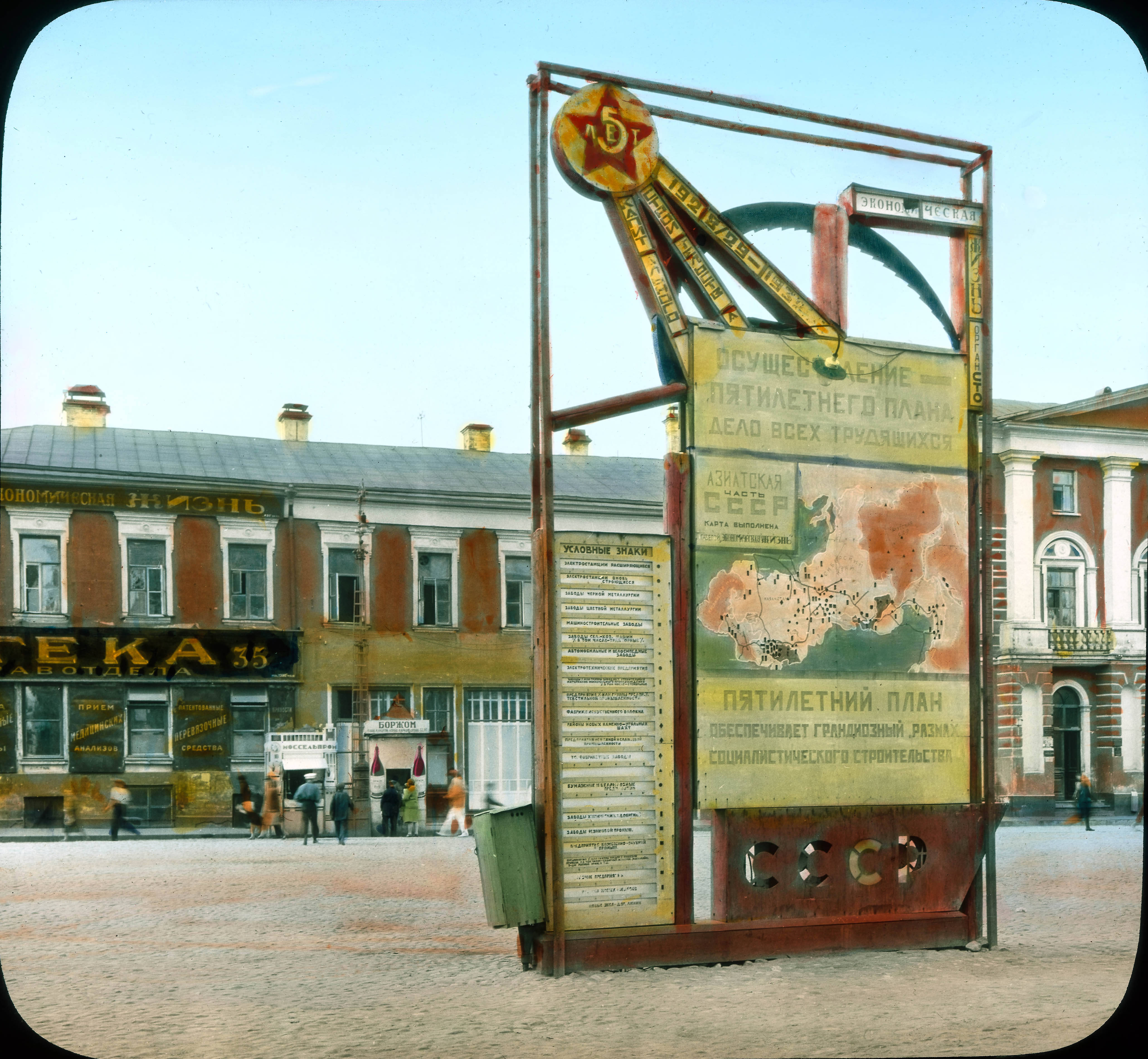
Propaganda stand dedicated to the first five-year plan in Moscow. 1931 colour photo by Branson DeCou.

The first five-year plan (Russian: I пятилетний план, первая пятилетка) (Note: Romanized: I pyatiletniy plan, pervaya pyatiletka) of the Union of Soviet Socialist Republics (USSR) was a list of economic goals, implemented by Communist Party General Secretary Joseph Stalin, based on his policy of socialism in one country. Leon Trotsky had delivered a joint report to the April Plenum of the Central Committee in 1926 which proposed a program for national industrialisation and the replacement of annual plans with five-year plans. His proposals were rejected by the Central Committee majority which was controlled by the troika and derided by Stalin at the time. Stalin's version of the five-year plan was implemented in 1928 and took effect until 1932.

The Soviet Union entered a series of five-year plans which began in 1928 under the rule of Joseph Stalin. Stalin launched what would later be referred to as a "revolution from above" to improve the Soviet Union's domestic policy. The policies were centered around rapid industrialization and the collectivization of agriculture. Stalin desired to remove and replace the mixed-economy policies of the New Economic Policy. (Note: The text of the report "The Results of the First Five-Year Plan" by J. V. Stalin delivered on January 7, 1933 to the Joint Plenum of the Central Committee and Central Control Commission can be found at: http://www.marxists.org) Some scholars have argued that the programme of mass industrialisation advocated by Leon Trotsky and the Left Opposition was co-opted after Trotsky's exile to serve as the basis of Stalin's first five-year plan. According to historian Sheila Fitzpatrick, the scholarly consensus was that Stalin appropriated the position of the Left Opposition on such matters as industrialisation and collectivisation.

== Collective farming and peasants' resistance ==
In 1929, Stalin edited the plan to include the creation of kolkhoz collective farming systems that stretched over thousands of acres of land and had hundreds of thousands of peasants working on them. The creation of collective farms essentially destroyed the kulaks as a class (dekulakization). Another consequence of this is that peasants resisted by killing their farm animals rather than turning them over to the State when their farms were collectivized. The resistance to Stalin's collectivization policies contributed to the famine in Ukraine, Russia, Kazakhstan as well as areas of the Northern Caucasus. Public machine and tractor stations were set up throughout the USSR, and peasants were allowed to rent these public tractors to farm the land, with the intention to increase the food output per peasant. Peasants were allowed to sell any surplus food from the land. However, the government planners failed to take notice of local situations. In 1932, grain production was 32% below average; to add to this problem, procurement of food increased by 44%. Agricultural production was so disrupted that famine broke out in several districts.

Because of the plan's reliance on rapid industrialization, major cultural changes had to occur in tandem. As this new social structure arose, conflicts occurred among some of the majority of the populations. In Turkmenistan, for example, the Soviet policy of collectivization shifted their production from cotton to food products; Russian settlers were given the best land, and Kazakh and Kyrgyz nomads were forced to settle down on soil without agricultural potential. Such a change caused unrest within a community that had already existed prior to this external adjustment, and between 1928 and 1932, Turkmen nomads and peasants made it clear through methods like passive resistance that they did not agree with such policies, the Kirgiziya area also knew guerrilla opposition.

== Reasoning ==
Prior to launching the first Soviet five-year plan, the Soviet Union had been facing threats from external sources as well as experiencing an economic and industrial downturn since the introduction of Bolshevik rule. The first war threat emerged from the East in 1924. A war scare arose in 1927 when multiple Western states, like Great Britain, began cutting off diplomatic relations with the Soviet Union. This created fear among the Soviets that the West was preparing to attack the Soviet Union again; during the Russian Civil War, foreign powers had occupied portions of Russian territory. The fear of invasion from the West left the Soviets feeling a need for rapid industrialization to increase Soviet war-making potential, and to compete with the Western powers. At the same time as the War Scare of 1927, dissatisfaction grew among the peasantry of the Soviet Union. This dissatisfaction arose from the famine of the early 1920s, as well as from increasing mistreatment of the peasants. Also during this time the secret police (the OGPU) had begun rounding up political dissenters in the Soviet Union. All these tensions had the potential to destroy the young Soviet Union and forced Joseph Stalin to introduce rapid industrialization of heavy industry so that the Soviet Union could address external and internal threats if needed.

== Rapid growth of heavy industry ==
The central aspect of the first Soviet five-year plan was the rapid industrialization of the Soviet Union from October 1928 to December 1932, which was thought to be the most crucial time for Russian industrialization. Rapid growth was facilitated starting in 1928 and continued to accelerate because of the building of heavy industry, which in turn raised living standards for peasants escaping the countryside. The Bolsheviks' need for rapid industrialization was once again out of the fear of impending war from the West. If war were to break out between the Soviet Union and the West, the Soviets would be fighting against some of the most industrialized nations in the world. The rapid industrialization would inhibit fears of being left unprotected if War between the Soviets and the West were to occur. To meet the needs of a possible war, the Soviet leaders set unrealistic quotas for production. To meet those unrealistic needs, the facilities had to be constructed quickly to facilitate material production before goods could be produced. During this period 1928–1932, massive industrial centers emerged in areas that were highly isolated before. These factories were not only for war production, but to produce tractors to meet the needs of mechanized agriculture. The Stalingrad Tractor Plant was built with the help of western allies and was meant to play a major factor in the rapid industrialization of Russia, Belarus and Ukraine. These isolated areas included Magnitogorsk, Dnieper, and Nizhny Novgorod. Magnitogorsk, the largest of the rapid industrialized areas of Russia, was founded in 1743, but became more prevalent in the early 1930s by Stalin. His plan was to make it a one-industry town. The city would become the largest steel producer in Russia and was meant to rival production that was being seen in the U.S. at the same time. During this era of Soviet history, heavy industry was supposed to experience a 350% increase in output. The Soviet Union's achievements were tremendous during the first five-year plan, which yielded a fifty-percent increase in industrial output. To achieve this massive economic growth, the Soviet Union had to reroute essential resources to meet the needs of heavy industry. 80% of the total investment of the first five-year plan, was focused heavily on the industrial sector. Programs not necessary to heavy industry were cut from the Soviet budget; and because of the redistribution of industrial funding, basic goods, such as food, became scarce. The Soviet Union then decided that the workers necessary for further industrialization should be given most of the available food. From this rapid industrialization a new working class emerged in the Soviet Union. This new society was to be an industrial working class, which could be considered much of the population with the purpose of becoming a technologically advanced industry. During this time the industrial workforce rose from 3.12 million in 1928 to 6.01 million at the end of the plan in 1932.

The Soviet Union promoted shock work during the first five-year plan in an effort to increase productivity through human effort in the absence of more developed machinery.

== Agricultural collectivization ==
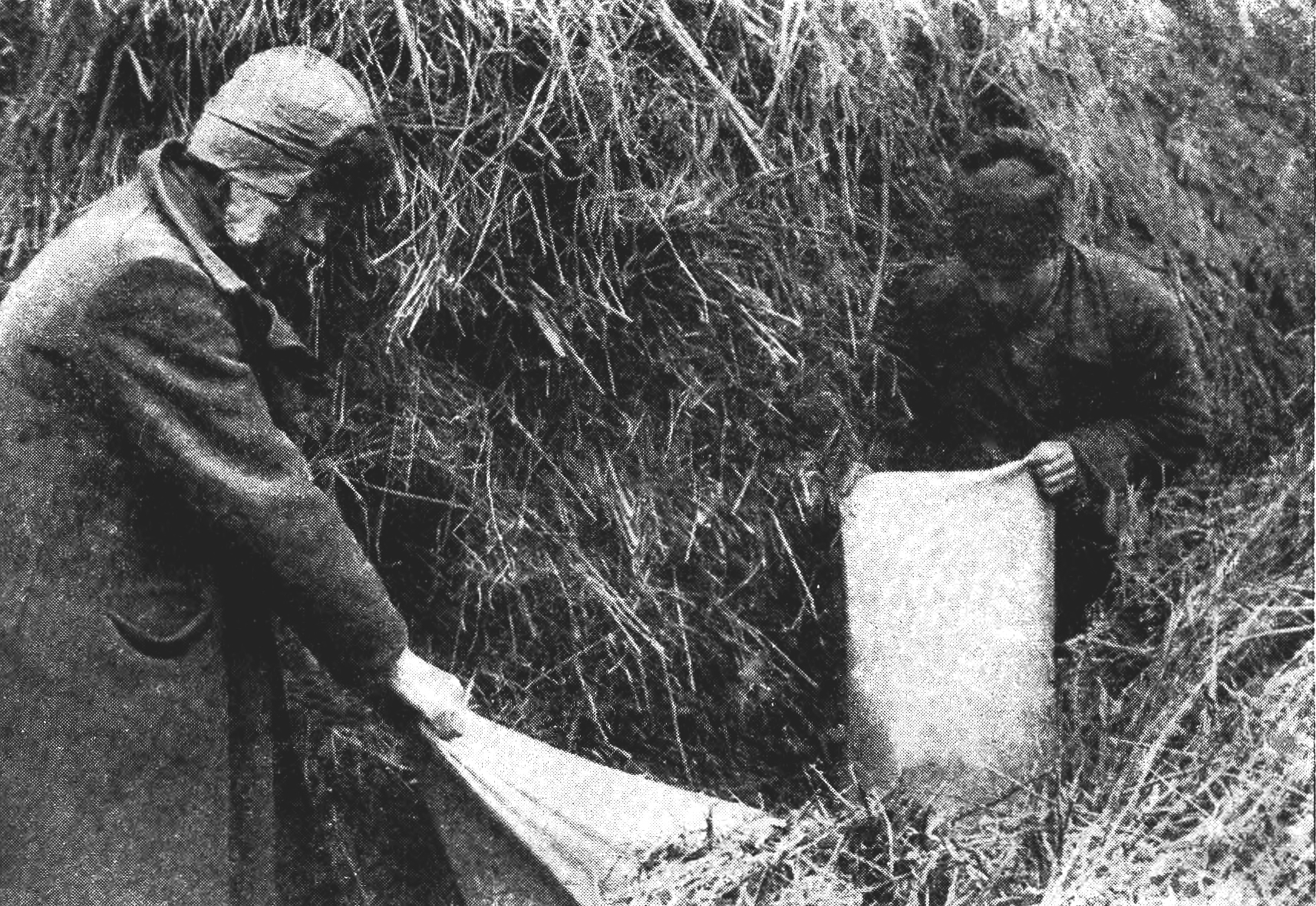
The requisition of grains from wealthy peasants (kulaks) during the forced collectivization in Timashyovsky District, Kuban Soviet Union. 1933

Agricultural collectivisation, within Russia, had its origins under Lenin during the New Economic Policy. One reason for the collectivization of Soviet agriculture was to increase the number of industrial workers for the new factories. Soviet officials also believed that collectivization would increase crop yields and help fund other programs. The Soviets enacted a land decree in 1917 that eliminated private ownership of land. Vladimir Lenin tried to establish removal of grain from wealthier peasants after the initial failure of state farms, but this was also unsuccessful. Peasants were mainly concerned for their own wellbeing and felt that the state had nothing of necessity to offer for the grain. This stockpiling of grain by the peasantry left millions of people in the city hungry, leading Lenin to establish his New Economic Policy (NEP) to keep the economy from crashing. NEP featured market reforms which were more consistent with democratic socialism than the existing centralized mode. By 1928, with the rapid industrialisation, and mass urbanization that followed, consumption was to increase rapidly as well. Need for urban dwellers to be fed, the FYP increased collectivization, leading to its recognition be largely associated with Stalin. Beginning in 1929 under the FYP, mass collectivization was communal farms being assigned an amount of agricultural output with government coercion. Villages had to agree to collectivization: some collectivization planners would hold endless meetings that would not end until villages joined; another tactic was through intimidation and coercion. Mass agricultural collectivization was largely supported by the middle and poor peasantry. As the peasant class itself was divided into three groups: kulaks, wealthy; serednyak, middle; bednyak, poor. The middle and lower class supported collectivization, because it took private land from individual kulaks, and distributed it among the serednyak and bednyak's villages. With the serednyak and bednyak joining collectivization they were also joining a kolkhoz. The kulaks did not support mass collectivization, as their land was being taken from them as well as their animals. At the end of 1929 the Soviets asserted themselves to forming collectivized peasant agriculture, but the "kulaks" had to be "liquidated as a class," because of their resistance to fixed agricultural prices. Resulting from this, the party behavior became uncontrolled and manic when the party began to requisition food from the countryside. Kulaks were executed, exiled or deported, based on their level of resistance to collectivization. The kulaks who were considered "counter-revolutionary" were executed or exiled, those who opposed collectivization were deported to remote regions and the rest were resettled to non-arable land in the same region. In the years following the agricultural collectivization, the reforms would disrupt the Soviet food supply. In turn, this disruption would eventually lead to famines for the many years following the first five-year plan, with 6–7 million dying from starvation in 1933.

Although Stalin reported in 1930 that collectivization was aiding the country, this was the era of exaggeration. Collectivization was under-planned; a lack of instructions, and unrealistic quotas were the reality. Lacking a foundation, collectivization led to the Kazakh famine of 1931–1933, in a region that had been a major grain producer. Farmers of Kazakhstan rejected collectivization, and protested, while Stalin raised quotas, meaning peasants would not be able to eat and would psychologically break them. Those who did not give up their grain were considered breaking Soviet law, which caused the famine. Death rates are estimated between 6–7 million. Stalin's second wife, Nadezhda Alliluyeva, committed suicide due to the atrocities of collectivization, particularly the famine. By the end of the FYP, agricultural collectivization showed minimal growth in production as well as profits.

== Prisoner labor ==
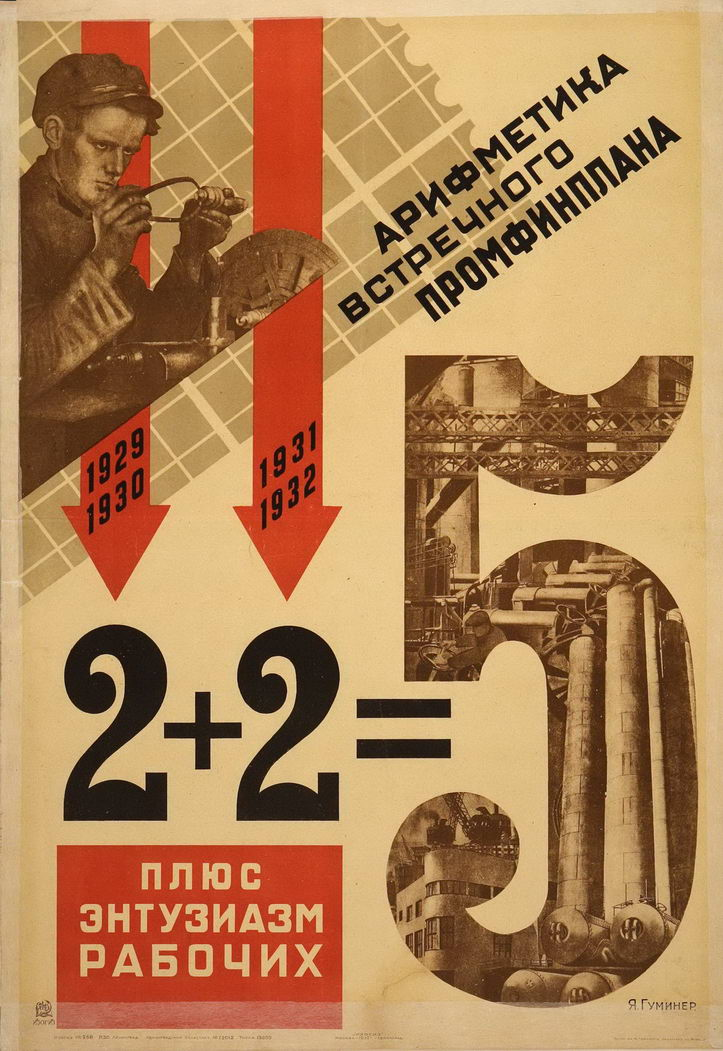
Yakov Guminer's 1931 propaganda poster reading: "The arithmetic of an industrial-financial counter-plan: 2 + 2 + Enthusiasm of workers = 5"

To meet the goals of the first five-year plan the Soviet Union began using the labor of its growing prisoner population. Initially the Soviet leaders sought to decrease the number of prisoners in the Soviet Union so that those resources could be rerouted to the five-year plan. This legislation led to many dangerous prisoners being released from prison into labor camps.

Early in the plan, however, the Communist leaders realized the necessity and the benefit of prisoner labor to complete the five-year plan. At this time the Soviet leaders attempted to orchestrate an increase in prison population. The people of the Soviet Union began being sentenced to forced labor, even when they committed small offenses, or committed no crime at all. Many of the prisoners used for labor were peasants who had resisted indoctrination. This was an attempt by the Soviet Union to acquire free labor for the rapid industrialization; however, it led to the incarceration of many innocent people in the Soviet Union. Eventually Western nations, such as the United States, began to boycott goods produced by this form of labor.

== Successes ==
Although many of the goals set by the plan were not fully met, there were several economic sectors that still saw large increases in their output. Areas like capital goods increased 158%, consumer goods increased by 87%, and total industrial output increased by 118%. In addition, despite the difficulties that agriculture underwent throughout the plan, the Soviets recruited more than 70,000 volunteers from the cities to help collectivize and work on farms in the rural areas.

The largest success of the first five-year plan, however, was the Soviet Union beginning its journey to become an economic and industrial superpower. Stalin declared the plan a success at the beginning of 1933, noting the creation of several heavy industries where none had existed, and that the plan was fulfilled in four years and three months instead of five years. The plan was also lauded by some members of the Western media, and although much of his reporting was later disputed, New York Times reporter Walter Duranty received the 1932 Pulitzer Prize for Correspondence for his coverage of the first five-year plan. Duranty's coverage of the five-year plan's many successes led directly to Franklin Roosevelt officially recognizing the Soviet Union in 1933.

The first five-year plan also began to prepare the Soviet Union to win in the Second World War. Without the initial five-year plan, and the ones that followed, the Soviet Union would not have been prepared for the German invasion in 1941. Due to the rapid industrialization of the plan, as well as the strategic construction of arms manufacturers in areas less vulnerable to future warfare, the Soviet Union was partially able to build the weapons it needed to defeat the Germans in 1945.

== Failures ==
The first plan saw unrealistic quotas set for industrialization that, in reality, would not be met for decades to come. The great push for industrialization caused quotas to consistently be looked at and adjusted. Quotas expecting to reach 235.9 percent output and labor to increase by 110 percent were unrealistic in the time frame they allotted for. The goals for the plans were not set and those that were, were constantly changed. Each time one quota was met, it was revised and made larger. Unions were being shut down which meant workers were no longer allowed to strike and were not protected from being fired or dismissed from work for reasons such as being late or just missing a day.

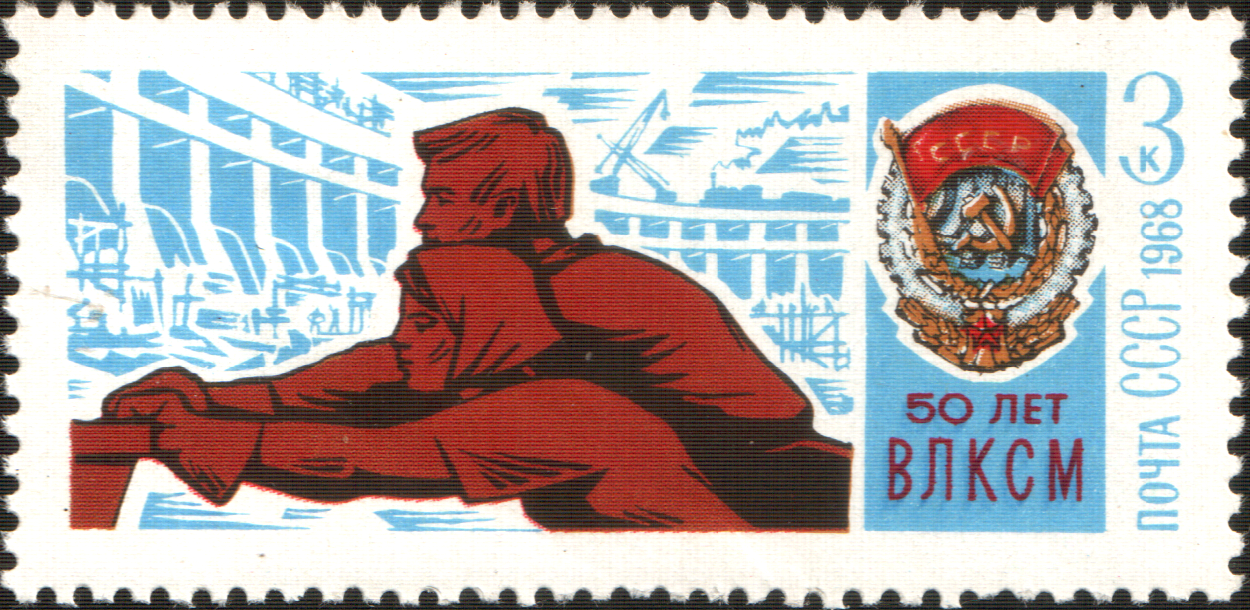
Stamp commemorating the First Five Year plan depicts a man and woman working together in an industrial setting.

Secondly, many western historians point to collectivization as a cause of the large-scale famine in the Soviet Union between 1932 and 1933 in which 3.3 to 7.5 million died. These famines were among the worst in history and created scars which would mark the Soviet Union for many years to come and incense a deep hatred of Russians by Ukrainians, Tatars, and many other ethnic groups. This famine led many Russians to relocate to find food, jobs, and shelter outside of their small villages which caused many towns to become overpopulated. Their diet consisted of bread but there was a major decrease in the amount of meat and dairy they were receiving if any at all. Aside from the three to four million people dying because of starvation or even freezing to death because of waiting in line for rations, people were not wanting or unable to have children which assisted in the decrease of the population. Hitler claimed the supposed disregard of human life by Russians toward non-Russians as one of his reasons to conduct Operation Barbarossa and gain initial victories over the Russians.

In his work, Revolution Betrayed, Trotsky argued that the excessive authoritarianism under Stalin had undermined the implementation of the first five-year plan. He noted that several engineers and economists who had created the plan were themselves later put on trial as "conscious wreckers who had acted on the instructions of a foreign power".

== Legacy ==
=== In cities ===
A number of streets and squares in major Russian cities are named after the plan, including the First Five-Year Plan Street in Chelyabinsk and Volgograd, and First Five-Year Plan Square in Yekaterinburg. The First Five-Year Plan saw Soviet cities sharply rise in population. At least 23 million Soviet peasants moved into cities, with Moscow's population rising by nearly 60 percent. A large portion of the Soviet Union's urbanization was due to the deportation of peasants from villages. From 1929 through 1931, 1.4 million peasants were deported into cities.

=== Cultural ===
The five-year plan saw the expedited transformation of Soviet social relations, nature, and economy. The plan's greatest supporters viewed it as the means to change the Soviet Union economically and socially. This change was visibly seen in the role of women in the industrial workplace where rudimentary figures show they comprised 30 percent of the workforce. The prevalence of women within the industrial workplace saw International Women's Day rise in significance in Soviet culture.

The five-year plans also saw a cultural change in the decline of the Kulak population within the Soviet Union. Members of Agitprop brigands attempted to use the push towards industrialization to isolate peasants from religion and away from the formerly influential Kulak population with performances in which they would deem that issues faced by peasant populations were the faults of the Kulaks. From 1929 through 1931, 3.5 million Kulaks were dispossessed by the Soviet Union and left with no choice but relocation to cities.

=== State investment ===
As a result of the first five-year plan, state investment volume increased from 15% in 1928 to 44% in 1932 due to the rise in industry. The first five-year plan resulted in the easy access of staple foods bread, potatoes and cabbage across the Soviet Union. Severe drops in agriculture did however result in famine and inflation as agricultural output and livestock numbers in general dropped.

=== Military ===
Soviet reports from before the five-year plan found that much of the military production capacities in the Soviet Union lay in the country's war threatened Western provinces and notably the city of Leningrad. In 1931, evacuation plans for military production facilities into deeper Soviet territories were drafted beginning a policy that would accelerate and relocate deeper within the Soviet Union during World War II.

=== Film industry ===
Between 1929 and 1936 the Soviet Union shifted from producing solely silent films to solely sound films. During this period, the Soviet government signed agreements with American, French and German companies to develop sound technology for Soviet cinema.

== See also ==
- Agriculture in the Soviet Union
- Bibliography of Stalinism and the Soviet Union
- Economy of the Soviet Union
- Left Opposition
- Primitive socialist accumulation
