= 25th Congress of the Communist Party of the Soviet Union =

1976 meeting of Soviet delegates

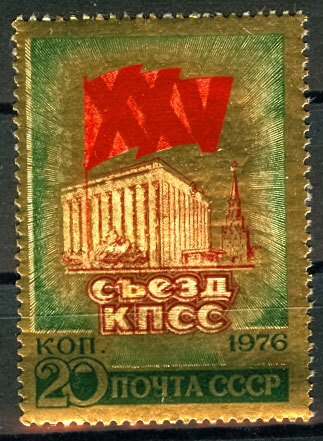
1976 USSR Postal Stamp, celebrating the 25th Congress

The 25th Congress of the Communist Party of the Soviet Union met in Moscow from February 24 to March 5, 1976. General Secretary Leonid Brezhnev greeted 4,998 Soviet delegates and representatives from 96 foreign countries. Among Communist-ruled nations, only the People's Republic of China and Albania did not send representatives. The congress itself produced few surprises, with the main emphasis placed on the stability of the political and economic situation and the prospects of continued success in the future. Brezhnev declared that the USSR would not invade or fight other countries, but also stated that he would support national liberation movements, despite détente. Little mention was made of fundamental problems facing the Soviet Union— the slowdown of the rate of economic growth, the low output of agriculture despite heavy investment. The only critical voices raised were those of foreign Communists. French Communist leader Georges Marchais boycotted the congress after criticizing the Soviet Union's suppression of dissidents.

A major problem that faced Soviet leaders, and one that was continually evaded, was the need to rejuvenate the Politburo, which was elected at the 1st Plenary Session of the 25th Central Committee. The membership of the 25th Politburo was slightly changed from the 24th Politburo, with the ouster of Soviet Agriculture Secretary Dmitry Polyansky in the wake of the failure of the 1975 grain harvest, and the addition of two new full members promoted from candidate status, Dmitriy Ustinov and Gregory Romanov. The subtraction of one and addition of two brought the full membership to 16. The members' average age was 66 years old. Brezhnev himself was 69.
