= Agriculture in the Soviet Union =

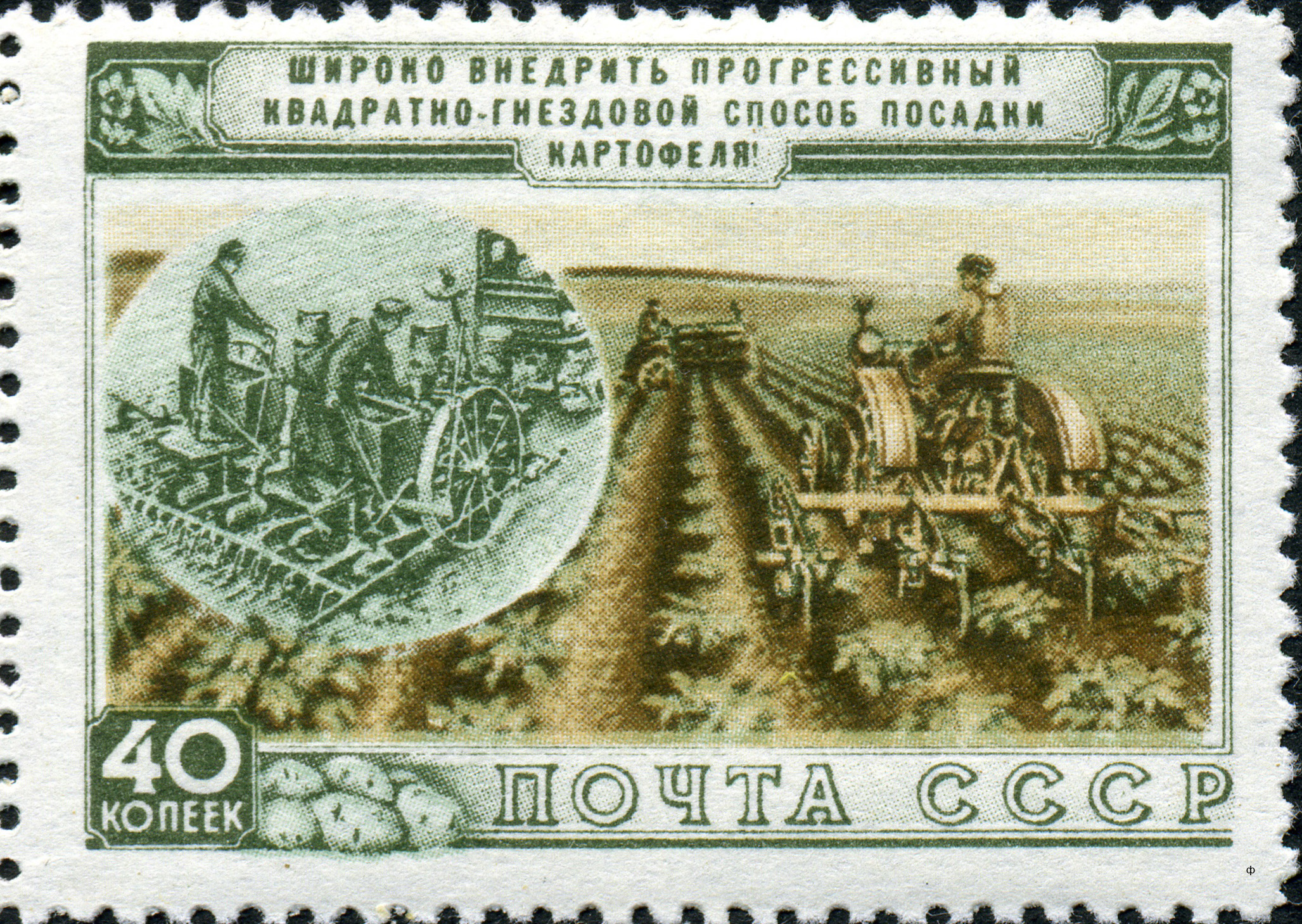
1954 stamp depicting potato planting

Agriculture in the Soviet Union was mostly collectivized, with some limited cultivation of private plots. It is often viewed as one of the more inefficient sectors of the economy of the Soviet Union. A number of food taxes (mainly prodrazverstka and prodnalog) were introduced in the early Soviet period despite the Decree on Land that immediately followed the October Revolution. The forced collectivization and class war against (vaguely defined) "kulaks" under Stalinism greatly disrupted farm output in the 1920s and 1930s, contributing to the Soviet famine of 1932–33 (most especially the Holodomor in Ukraine). A system of state and collective farms, known as sovkhozes and kolkhozes, respectively, placed the rural population in a system intended to be unprecedentedly productive and fair but which turned out to be chronically inefficient and lacking in fairness. Under the administrations of Nikita Khrushchev, Leonid Brezhnev, and Mikhail Gorbachev, many reforms (such as Khrushchev's Virgin Lands Campaign) were enacted as attempts to defray the inefficiencies of the Stalinist agricultural system. However, Marxist–Leninist ideology did not allow for any substantial amount of market mechanism to coexist alongside central planning, so the private plot fraction of Soviet agriculture, which was its most productive, remained confined to a limited role. Throughout its later decades the Soviet Union never stopped using substantial portions of the precious metals mined each year in Siberia to pay for grain imports, which has been taken by various authors as an economic indicator showing that the country's agriculture was never as successful as it ought to have been. The real numbers, however, were treated as state secrets at the time, so accurate analysis of the sector's performance was limited outside the USSR and nearly impossible to assemble within its borders. However, Soviet citizens as consumers were familiar with the fact that foods, especially meats, were often noticeably scarce, to the point that not lack of money so much as lack of things to buy with it was the limiting factor in their standard of living.

Despite immense land resources, extensive farm machinery and agrochemical industries, and a large rural workforce, Soviet agriculture was relatively unproductive. Output was hampered in many areas by the climate and poor worker productivity. However, Soviet farm performance was not uniformly bad. Organized on a large scale and relatively highly mechanized, its state and collective agriculture made the Soviet Union one of the world's leading producers of cereals, although bad harvests (as in 1972 and 1975) necessitated imports and slowed the economy. The 1976–1980 five-year plan shifted resources to agriculture, and 1978 saw a record harvest. Conditions were best in the temperate chernozem (black earth) belt stretching from Ukraine through southern Russia into the east, spanning the extreme southern portions of Siberia. In addition to cereals, cotton, sugar beets, potatoes, and flax were also major crops. Such performance showed that underlying potential was not lacking, which was not surprising as the agriculture in the Russian Empire was traditionally amongst the highest producing in the world, although rural social conditions since the October Revolution were hardly improved. Grains were mostly produced by the sovkhozes and kolkhozes, but vegetables and herbs often came from private plots.

== History ==
The term "Stalin's revolution" has been used for this transition, and that conveys well its violent, destructive, and utopian character.

— Sheila Fitzpatrick, Everyday Stalinism, Introduction, Milestones.

Leon Trotsky and the Opposition bloc had advocated a programme of industrialization which also proposed agricultural cooperatives and the formation of collective farms on a voluntary basis. According to Fitzpatrick, the scholarly consensus was that Stalin appropriated the position of the Left Opposition on such matters as industrialisation and collectivisation. Other scholars have argued that the economic programme of Trotsky differed from the forced policy of collectivisation implemented by Stalin after 1928 due to the levels of brutality associated with its enforcement.

During the Russian Civil War, Joseph Stalin's experience as political chief of various regions, carrying out the dictates of war communism, involved extracting grain from peasants, including extraction at gunpoint from those who were not supportive of the Bolshevik (Red) side of the war (such as Whites and Greens). After a grain crisis during 1928, Stalin established the USSR's system of state and collective farms when he moved to replace the New Economic Policy (NEP) with collective farming, which grouped peasants into collective farms (kolkhozy) and state farms (sovkhozy). These collective farms allowed for faster mechanization, and indeed, this period saw widespread use of farming machinery for the first time in many parts of the USSR, and a rapid recovery of agricultural outputs, which had been damaged by the Russian Civil War. Both grain production, and the number of farm animals rose above pre-civil war levels by early 1931, before major famine undermined these initially good results.

At the same time, individual farming and khutirs were liquidated through class discrimination identifying such elements as kulaks. In Soviet propaganda, kulaks were portrayed as counter-revolutionaries and organizers of anti-Soviet protests and terrorist acts. In Ukraine the Turkic name "korkulu" was adopted, which meant "dangerous". The word itself is foreign to Ukraine. According to the Ukrainian Soviet Encyclopedia, struggle with kulaks in Ukraine was taking place more intensely than anywhere else in the Soviet Union.

Coincidentally with the start of First "pyatiletka" (5 year plan), a new commissariat of the Soviet Union was created, better known as Narkomzem (People's Commissariat of Land Cultivation) led by Yakov Yakovlev. After the speech on collectivization that Stalin gave to the Communist Academy, there were no specific instructions on how exactly it had to be implemented, except for liquidation of kulaks as a class. Stalin's revolution was one of the factors which led to the severe Soviet famine of 1932–33, better known in Ukraine as the Holodomor. Official Soviet sources blamed the famine on counterrevolutionary efforts by the kulaks, though there is little evidence for this claim. Another contributing factor to the famine suggested by some historians, was poor weather conditions and poor harvests. The famine started in Ukraine in the winter of 1931 and despite the lack of any official reports the news spread by word of mouth rapidly. During that time restrictions on rail travel were set by authorities. Only next year in 1932-33 the famine spread outside of Ukraine to agricultural regions of Russia and Kazakhstan, while the "news blackout continued". The famine led to the introduction of the internal passport system, due to the unmanageable flow of migrants to the cities. The famine finally ended in 1933, after a successful harvest. Collectivization continued. During the second five-year plan Stalin came up with another famous slogan in 1935: "Life has become better, life has become more cheerful." Rationing was lifted. In 1936, due to a poor harvest, fears of another famine led to famously long breadlines. However, no such famine occurred, and these fears proved largely unfounded.

During the second five-year plan, under the policy of "cultural revolution", the Soviet authorities established fines that were collected from farmers. Citing Siegelbaum's Stakhanovism in her book Everyday Stalinism, Fitzpatrick wrote: "...in a district in the Voronezh Region, one rural soviet chairman imposed fines on kolkhoz members totaling 60,000 rubles in 1935 and 1936: "He imposed the fines on any pretext and at his own discretion - for not showing up for work, for not attending literacy classes, for 'impolite language', for not having dogs tied up... Kolkhoznik M. A. Gorshkov was fined 25 rubles for the fact that 'in his hut the floors were not washed'".

=== Khrushchev Era 1955-1963 ===
Nikita Khrushchev was a top expert on agricultural policies and looked especially at collectivism, state farms, liquidation of machine-tractor stations, planning decentralization, economic incentives, increased labor and capital investment, new crops, and new production programs. Henry Ford had been at the center of American technology transfer to the Soviet Union in the 1930s; he sent over factory designs, engineers, and skilled craftsmen, as well as tens of thousands of Ford tractors. By the 1940s Khrushchev was keenly interested in American agricultural innovations, especially on large-scale family-operated farms in the Midwest. In the 1950s he sent several delegations to visit farms and land grant colleges, looking at successful farms that utilized high-yielding seed varieties, very large and powerful tractors and other machines, all guided by modern management techniques. Especially after his visit to the United States in 1959, he was keenly aware of the need to emulate and even match American superiority and agricultural technology.

Khrushchev became a hyper-enthusiastic crusader to grow corn (maize). He established a corn institute in Ukraine and ordered thousands of hectares to be planted with corn in the Virgin Lands. More than 1.5 million people went to Kazakhstan, the Volga Region, Siberia, and the Ural Mountains. In 1955, Khrushchev advocated an Iowa-style corn belt in the Soviet Union, and a Soviet delegation visited the U.S. state that summer. The delegation chief was approached by farmer and corn seed salesman Roswell Garst, who persuaded him to visit Garst's large farm. The Iowan visited the Soviet Union, where he became friends with Khrushchev, and Garst sold the USSR 5,000 short tons (4,500 t) of seed corn. Garst warned the Soviets to grow the corn in the southern part of the country and to ensure there were sufficient stocks of fertilizer, insecticides, and herbicides. This, however, was not done, as Khrushchev sought to plant corn even in Siberia, and without the necessary chemicals. The corn experiment was not a great success, and he later complained that overenthusiastic officials, wanting to please him, had overplanted without laying the proper groundwork, and "as a result corn was discredited as a silage crop—and so was I".

Khrushchev sought to abolish the Machine-Tractor Stations (MTS) which not only owned most large agricultural machines such as combines and tractors but also provided services such as plowing, and transfer their equipment and functions to the kolkhozes and sovkhozes (state farms). After a successful test involving MTS which served one large kolkhoz each, Khrushchev ordered a gradual transition—but then ordered that the change take place with great speed. Within three months, over half of the MTS facilities had been closed, and kolkhozes were being required to buy the equipment, with no discount given for older or dilapidated machines. MTS employees, unwilling to bind themselves to kolkhozes and lose their state employee benefits and the right to change their jobs, fled to the cities, creating a shortage of skilled operators. The costs of the machinery, plus the costs of building storage sheds and fuel tanks for the equipment, impoverished many kolkhozes. Inadequate provisions were made for repair stations. Without the MTS, the market for Soviet agricultural equipment fell apart, as the kolkhozes now had neither the money nor skilled buyers to purchase new equipment.

In the 1940s Stalin put Trofim Lysenko in charge of agricultural research, with his crackpot ideas that flouted modern genetics science. Lysenko maintained his influence under Khrushchev, and helped block the adoption of American techniques. In 1959, Khrushchev announced a goal of overtaking the United States in the production of milk, meat, and butter. Local officials kept Khrushchev happy with unrealistic pledges of production. These goals were met by farmers who slaughtered their breeding herds and by purchasing meat at state stores, then reselling it back to the government, artificially increasing recorded production. In June 1962, food prices were raised, particularly on meat and butter, by 25–30%. This caused public discontent. In the southern Russian city of Novocherkassk (Rostov Region), this discontent escalated to a strike and a revolt against the authorities. The revolt was put down by the military. According to Soviet official accounts, 22 people were killed and 87 wounded. In addition, 116 demonstrators were convicted of involvement and seven of them executed. Information about the revolt was completely suppressed in the USSR, but spread through Samizdat and damaged Khrushchev's reputation in the West.

Drought struck the Soviet Union in 1963; the harvest of 107,500,000 short tons (97,500,000 t) of grain was down from a peak of 134,700,000 short tons (122,200,000 t) in 1958. The shortages resulted in bread lines, a fact at first kept from Khrushchev. Reluctant to purchase food in the West, but faced with the alternative of widespread hunger, Khrushchev exhausted the nation's hard currency reserves and expended part of its gold stockpile in the purchase of grain and other foodstuffs.

== Agricultural labour ==
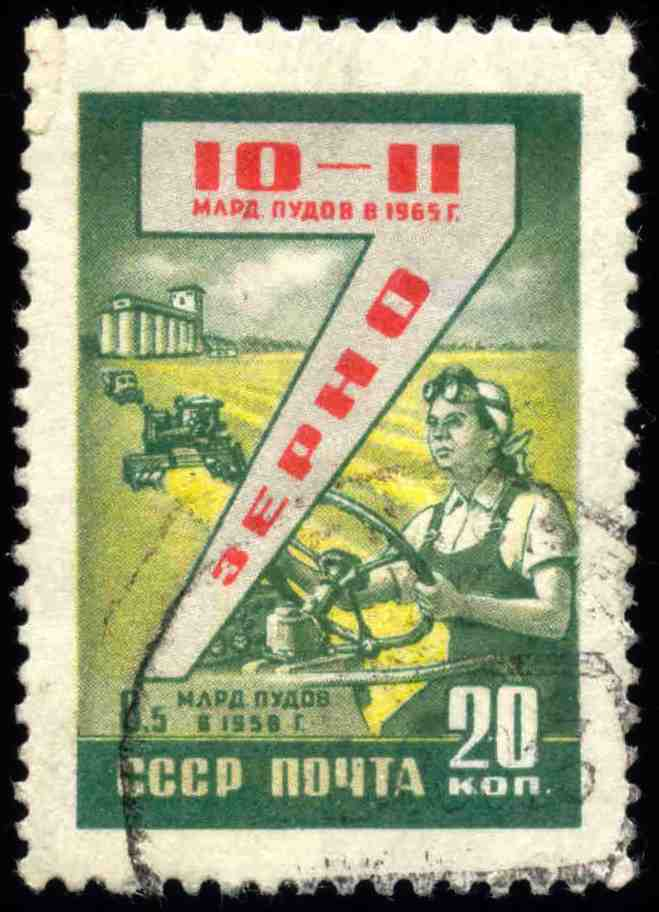
Soviet Union stamp, the seven-year plan, grain; 1959, 20 kop., used, CPA No. 2345.

It had been the leaders' hope that the peasantry could be made to pay most of the costs of industrialization; the collectivization of peasant agriculture that accompanied the first five-year plan was intended to achieve this effect by forcing peasants to accept low state prices for their goods.

— Sheila Fitzpatrick, Everyday Stalinism, Introduction, Milestones.

Stalin's campaign of forced collectivization relied on propiska to keep farmers tied to the land. The collectivization was a major factor explaining the sector's poor performance. It has been referred to as a form of "neo-serfdom", in which the Communist bureaucracy replaced the former landowners. In the new state and collective farms, outside directives failed to take local growing conditions into account, and peasants were often required to supply much of their produce for nominal payment.

Also, interference in the day-to-day affairs of peasant life often bred resentment and worker alienation across the countryside. The human toll was very large, with millions, perhaps as many as 5.3 million, dying from famine due largely to collectivisation, and much livestock was slaughtered by the peasants for their own consumption. In the collective and state farms, low labor productivity was a consequence for the entire Soviet period. As in other economic sectors, the government promoted Stakhanovism as a means to improve labor productivity. This system was thrilling to a few workers who had both the talent and the vanity to make everyone else's performance look bad, but it was generally regarded as dispiriting and a form of apple polishing by most workers, especially in the later decades of the union, when socialist idealism had become moribund among the rank-and-file. It also tended to be destructive of the state's capital equipment, which was thrashed and soon trashed instead of being well maintained.

The sovkhozy tended to emphasize larger scale production than the kolkhozy and had the ability to specialize in certain crops. The government tended to supply them with better machinery and fertilizers, not least because Soviet ideology held them to be a higher step on the scale of socialist transition. Machine and tractor stations were established with the "lower form" of socialist farm, the kolkhoz, mainly in mind, because they were at first not trusted with ownership of their own capital equipment (too "capitalist") as well as not trusted to know how to use it well without close instruction. Labor productivity (and in turn incomes) tended to be greater on the sovkhozy. Workers in state farms received wages and social benefits, whereas those on the collective farms tended to receive a portion of the net income of their farm, based, in part, on the success of the harvest and their individual contribution.

Although accounting for a small share of cultivated area, private plots produced a substantial share of the country's meat, milk, eggs, and vegetables.

The private plots were also an important source of income for rural households. In 1977, families of kolkhoz members obtained 72% of their meat, 76% of their eggs and most of their potatoes from private holdings. Surplus products, as well as surplus livestock, were sold to kolkhozy and sovkhozy and also to state consumer cooperatives. Statistics may actually under-represent the total contribution of private plots to Soviet agriculture. The only time when private plots were completely banned was during collectivization, when famine took millions of lives.

== Efficiency or inefficiency of collective farming ==
The idea that the Soviet Union was not getting good enough results out of its farming sector, and that the top leadership needed to take significant actions to correct this, was a theme that permeated Soviet economics for the entire lifespan of the union. In the 1920s through 1940s, the first variation on the subject was that counter-revolutionary subversive wrecking need to be ferreted out and violently repressed. In the late 1950s through 1970s, the focus shifted to lack of technocratic finesse, with the idea that smarter technocratic management would fix things. By the 1980s, the final variation of the theme was a bifurcation between people who wanted to substantially shake up the nomenklatura system and those who wanted to double down on its ossification.

After Stalin died and a troika belatedly emerged, Georgy Malenkov proposed agricultural reforms. But in 1957, Nikita Khrushchev achieved a purge of that troika and began proposing his reforms, of which the Virgin Lands Campaign is the most famous. During and after Khrushchev's premiership, Alexei Kosygin wanted to reorganize Soviet agriculture instead of increasing investments. He claimed that the main reason for inefficiency in the sector could be blamed on the sector's infrastructure. Once he became the Chairman of the Council of Ministers, he was able to direct the 1965 Soviet economic reform.

The theory behind collectivization included not only that it would be socialist instead of capitalist but also that it would replace the small-scale unmechanized and inefficient farms that were then commonplace in the Soviet Union with large-scale mechanized farms that would produce food far more efficiently. Lenin saw private farming as a source of capitalist mentalities and hoped to replace farms with either sovkhozy which would make the farmers "proletarian" workers or kolkhozy which would at least be collective. However, most observers say that despite isolated successes, collective farms and sovkhozes were inefficient, the agricultural sector being weak throughout the history of the Soviet Union.

Hedrick Smith wrote in The Russians (1976) that, according to Soviet statistics, one fourth of the value of agricultural production in 1973 was produced on the private plots peasants were allowed (2% of the whole arable land). In the 1980s, 3% of the land was in private plots which produced more than a quarter of the total agricultural output. i.e. private plots produced somewhere around 1600% and 1100% as much as common ownership plots in 1973 and 1980. Soviet figures claimed that the Soviets produced 20–25% as much as the U.S. per farmer in the 1980s.

This was despite the fact that the Soviet Union had invested enormously to agriculture. Production costs were very high and the USSR had widespread food shortages even though the country had a large share of the best agricultural soil in the world and a high land/population ratio.

The claims of inefficiency have been criticized by Neo-Marxist Economist Joseph E. Medley. Statistics based on value rather than volume of production may give one view of reality, as public-sector food was heavily subsidized and sold at much lower prices than private-sector produce. Also, the 2–3% of arable land allotted as private plots does not include the large area allocated to the peasants as pasturage for their private livestock; combined with land used to produce grain for fodder, the pasture and the individual plots total almost 20% of all Soviet farmland. Private farming may also be relatively inefficient, taking roughly 40% of all agricultural labor to produce only 26% of all output by value. Another problem is these criticisms tend to discuss only a small number of consumer products and do not take into account the fact that the kolkhozy and sovkhozy produced mainly grain, cotton, flax, forage, seed, and other non-consumer goods with a relatively low value per unit area. This economist admits to some inefficiency in Soviet agriculture, but claims that the failure reported by most Western experts was a myth. He believes the above criticisms to be ideological and emphasizes "the possibility that socialized agriculture may be able to make valuable contributions to improving human welfare".

== In popular culture ==
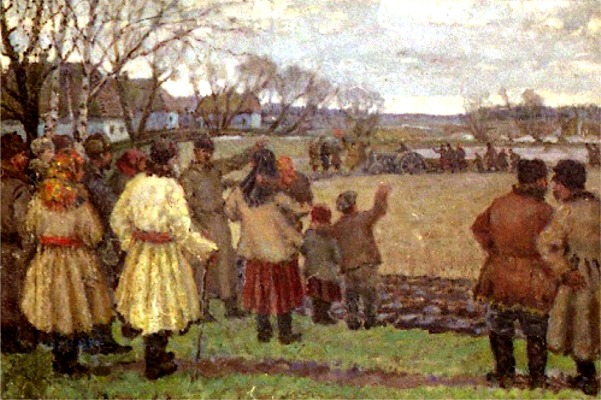
Vladimir Krikhatsky's The First Tractor presents a Socialist view of country mechanization.

Soviet culture presented an agro-Romantic view of country life. After the fall of Soviet Union, it has been recreated tongue-in-cheek in the albums and videos of the Moldovan group Zdob şi Zdub.

== Research ==
The Tsar's Petrovskaya Agricultural Academy was taken over during the Revolution and renamed the Moscow Agricultural Institute. (Today known as the Russian State Agrarian University – Moscow Timiryazev Agricultural Academy.) One of its graduates was Nikolai Vavilov, who would go on to contribute greatly - albeit controversially during Stalin's rule. Vavilov was greatly disliked by Lysenko but after his death was recognised as a hero to Soviet agricultural research and indeed to agricultural science worldwide.

Under Supreme Soviet legislation the experimental plots/fields of agricultural research and agricultural educational institutions were inviolable, not to be seized and repurposed even by state agencies. Exceptions could be made rarely and only by the USSR or Republic governments themselves.

== See also ==
- Bibliography of the Holodomor
- Agriculture in Russia
- Agriculture in the Russian Empire
- Bibliography of the Russian Revolution and Civil War § Peasants
- Bibliography of Stalinism and the Soviet Union § Agriculture and the peasantry
- Bibliography of the Post Stalinist Soviet Union § Rural life and agriculture
- Famines in Russia and USSR
- Passport system in the Soviet Union
- Trofim Lysenko
