= Era of Stagnation =

1964–1985 period of the Soviet Union

The Era of Stagnation (Russian: Пери́од засто́я, romanized: Períod zastóya, or Эпо́ха засто́я Epókha zastóya) is a term used to describe the economic, political, and social era in the history of the Soviet Union that began during the leadership of Leonid Brezhnev (1964–1982) and continued under Yuri Andropov (1982–1984) and Konstantin Chernenko (1984–1985). The term was coined by Mikhail Gorbachev to describe the economic difficulties that developed during Brezhnev's rule. The era is sometimes called the Brezhnevian Stagnation in English.

== Terminology ==
During the period of Brezhnev's leadership, the term "Era of Stagnation" was not used. Instead, in Soviet ideology, the term "period of developed socialism" (Russian: пери́од развито́го социали́зма) was used for the period that started in 1973. This Soviet concept was officially declared at the 24th Congress of the Communist Party of the Soviet Union in 1971. It stemmed from the failure of Khrushchev's promise in 1961 of reaching communism in 20 years and was a replacement for the concept "period of the extensive construction of communism" (Russian: период развёрнутого строительства коммунизма). It was in the 1980s that the Soviet leader Mikhail Gorbachev coined the term "Era of Stagnation" to describe the economic difficulties that developed when Leonid Brezhnev led the Soviet Union from 1964 to 1982. After becoming leader of the Soviet Union, Gorbachev would characterize the economy under Brezhnev's leadership as "the lowest stage of socialism". Scholars have subsequently disagreed on the dates, the significance, and the causes of the stagnation. Supporters of Gorbachev have criticized Brezhnev himself and the Brezhnev administration in general for being too conservative and failing to change with the times.

== History ==
After the death of Soviet leader Joseph Stalin in 1953, a program of policy change was begun, later known as de-Stalinization. Nikita Khrushchev, who succeeded Stalin's brief successor Georgy Malenkov as Soviet leader, introduced relatively liberal reforms during the period known as the Khrushchev Thaw. This period also brought an economic increase that topped at 6%. The Manege Affair of 1962, during which Khrushchev publicly criticized an exhibition of Soviet art, led to the reassertion of Communist Party control over the arts and marked the beginning of the end of the Cultural Thaw.

Brezhnev replaced Khrushchev as Soviet leader in 1964. The Brezhnev Era (1964–1982) began with high economic growth and soaring prosperity, but gradually significant problems in social, political, and economic areas accumulated. Social stagnation began following Brezhnev's rise to power, when he revoked several of Khrushchev's reforms and partially rehabilitated some Stalinist policies, such as centralized control, suppression of dissent, and economic centralization. Some commentators regard the start of social stagnation as being the Sinyavsky–Daniel trial in 1966, in which two writers were convicted of anti-Soviet agitation and which marked the end of the Khrushchev Thaw. Others place it at the time of the Warsaw Pact invasion of Czechoslovakia in 1968 that suppressed the Prague Spring. The period's political stagnation is associated with the establishment of gerontocracy, which came into being as part of the policy of stability.

The majority of scholars set the starting year for economic stagnation at 1975, although some claim that it began as early as the 1960s. Industrial growth rates declined during the 1970s as heavy industry and the arms industry were prioritized while Soviet consumer goods were neglected. The value of all consumer goods manufactured in 1972 in retail prices was about 118 billion roubles. Historians, scholars, and specialists are uncertain what caused the stagnation, with some arguing that the command economy suffered from systemic flaws that inhibited growth. Others have argued that the lack of reforms or the high expenditures on the military led to stagnation.

The stagnation of the Soviet economy was fueled even further by the Soviet Union's ever-widening technological gap with the West. Due to the cumbersome procedures of the centralized planning system, Soviet industries were incapable of the innovation needed to meet public demand. This was especially notable in the field of computing in the Soviet Union. In response to the lack of uniform standards for peripherals and digital capacity in the Soviet computer industry, Brezhnev's regime ordered an end to all independent computer development and required all future models to be based on the IBM/360. However, following the adoption of the IBM/360 system, the Soviet Union was never able to build enough platforms, let alone improve on its design. As its technology continued to fall behind the West, the Soviet Union increasingly resorted to pirating Western designs.

Brezhnev has been criticized posthumously for doing too little to improve the economic situation. Throughout his leadership, no major reforms were initiated and the few proposed reforms were either very modest or opposed by the majority of the Soviet leadership. The reform-minded Chairman of the Council of Ministers (Government), Alexei Kosygin, introduced two modest reforms in the 1970s after the failure of his more radical 1965 reform and attempted to reverse the trend of declining growth. By the 1970s, Brezhnev had consolidated enough power to stop any "radical" reform-minded attempts by Kosygin.

The last significant reform undertaken by the Kosygin government, and some believe in the pre-perestroika era, was a joint decision of the Central Committee and the Council of Ministers named "Improving planning and reinforcing the effects of the economic mechanism on raising the effectiveness in production and improving the quality of work", more commonly known as the 1979 reform. The reform, in contrast to the 1965 reform, sought to increase the central government's economic involvement by enhancing the duties and responsibilities of the ministries. With Kosygin's death in 1980, and due to his successor Nikolai Tikhonov's conservative approach to economics, very little of the reform was actually carried out.

After the death of Brezhnev in November 1982, Yuri Andropov succeeded him as Soviet leader. Brezhnev's legacy was a Soviet Union that was much less dynamic than it had been when he assumed power in 1964. During Andropov's short leadership, modest reforms were introduced; he died little more than a year later in February 1984. Konstantin Chernenko, his successor, continued many of Andropov's policies. The economic problems that began under Brezhnev persisted into these short-lived administrations, and scholars still debate whether the reform policies that were followed improved the economic situation in the country.

The Era of Stagnation ended with Gorbachev's rise to power, during which political and social life was democratized even though the economy was still stagnating. Under Gorbachev's leadership, the Communist Party began efforts to accelerate economic development in 1985 through massive injections of finance into heavy industry (Uskoreniye). When these failed, the Communist Party restructured (perestroika) the Soviet economy and government by introducing quasi-capitalist (Khozraschyot) and democratic (demokratizatsiya) reforms. These were intended to re-energize the Soviet Union but inadvertently led to its dissolution in 1991.

== Economy ==
=== Analysis ===
Robert Service, author of the History of Modern Russia: From Tsarism to the Twenty-first Century, claims that with mounting economic problems worker discipline decreased, which the government could not counter effectively because of the full employment policy. According to Service, this policy led to government industries, such as factories, mines and offices, being staffed by undisciplined and unproductive personnel ultimately leading to a "work-shy workforce" among Soviet workers and administrators. While the Soviet Union under Brezhnev had the "second greatest industrial capacity" after the United States, and produced more "steel, oil, pig-iron, cement and ... tractors" than any other country in the world, Service treats the problems of agriculture during the Brezhnev era as proof of the need for de-collectivization. In short, Service considers the Soviet economy to have become "static" during this time period, and Brezhnev's policy of stability was a "recipe for political disaster".

Richard Sakwa, author of the book The Rise and Fall of the Soviet Union: 1917–1991, takes a dimmer view of the Brezhnev era by claiming that growth rates fell "inexorably" from the 1950s until they stopped completely in the 1980s. His reasoning for this stagnation was the growing demand for unskilled workers resulted in a decline of productivity and labour discipline. Sakwa believes that stability itself led to stagnation and claimed that without strong leadership "Soviet socialism had a tendency to relapse into stagnation."

According to Edwin Bacon and Mark Sandle, authors of Brezhnev Reconsidered, the economy under Brezhnev was as dynamic as the economy presided over by Nikita Khrushchev, but this dynamism had stalled by the time Yuri Andropov, and subsequently Konstantin Chernenko, became General Secretary. Mark Harrison claims that the economic performance of the Brezhnev era has not been looked at objectively as analysis of the period sometimes used lower estimates. Harrison further claims that in the period between 1928 and 1973 the Soviet economy grew in a phase that would surpass the United States "one day". During the international oil crisis, growth in the Soviet Union and the Eastern Bloc halted abruptly and stalled for a longer period than in the West causing the economy to begin stagnating. One explanation, according to Harrison, is that the Soviet economy could not sustain its extensive growth patterns. Other explanations include: the lack of Soviet, and communist bloc, transparency with other nations hindering globalisation and misinterpretation of a "permanent" post–World War II economic boom leading to faulty economic decisions. He claims that the economic policies of Andropov, and Chernenko, had improved the economic situation in the country and Mikhail Gorbachev inherited a more dynamic and vibrant economy in a "pre-crisis situation" where the economy was still growing with low internal and external debts, compared to the economy that Andropov and Chernenko inherited.

Archie Brown, author of The Rise and Fall of Communism, claims in his book that the term Era of Stagnation "was in many ways a fitting description, for this was a period of declining growth", but noted it could be misleading in non-economic spheres. Brown states there were high growth rates in the mid-to-late 1960s (during the Eighth Five-Year Plan) claiming that the Soviet economy "enjoyed stronger growth in the second half of the 1960s than it ever did thereafter". The link between these growth rates and the Kosygin reform is, according to Brown, "tenuous", but says that "From the point of view of communist leaders, the Brezhnev era was in many ways successful". The Soviet Union's natural resources provided a strong economic foundation, which bore fruit during the 1973 oil crisis and "turned out to be an energy bonanza". On the other hand, Brown states it was a sign of weakness that the Soviet Union grew so dependent on its natural resources, as it did in the 1970s.

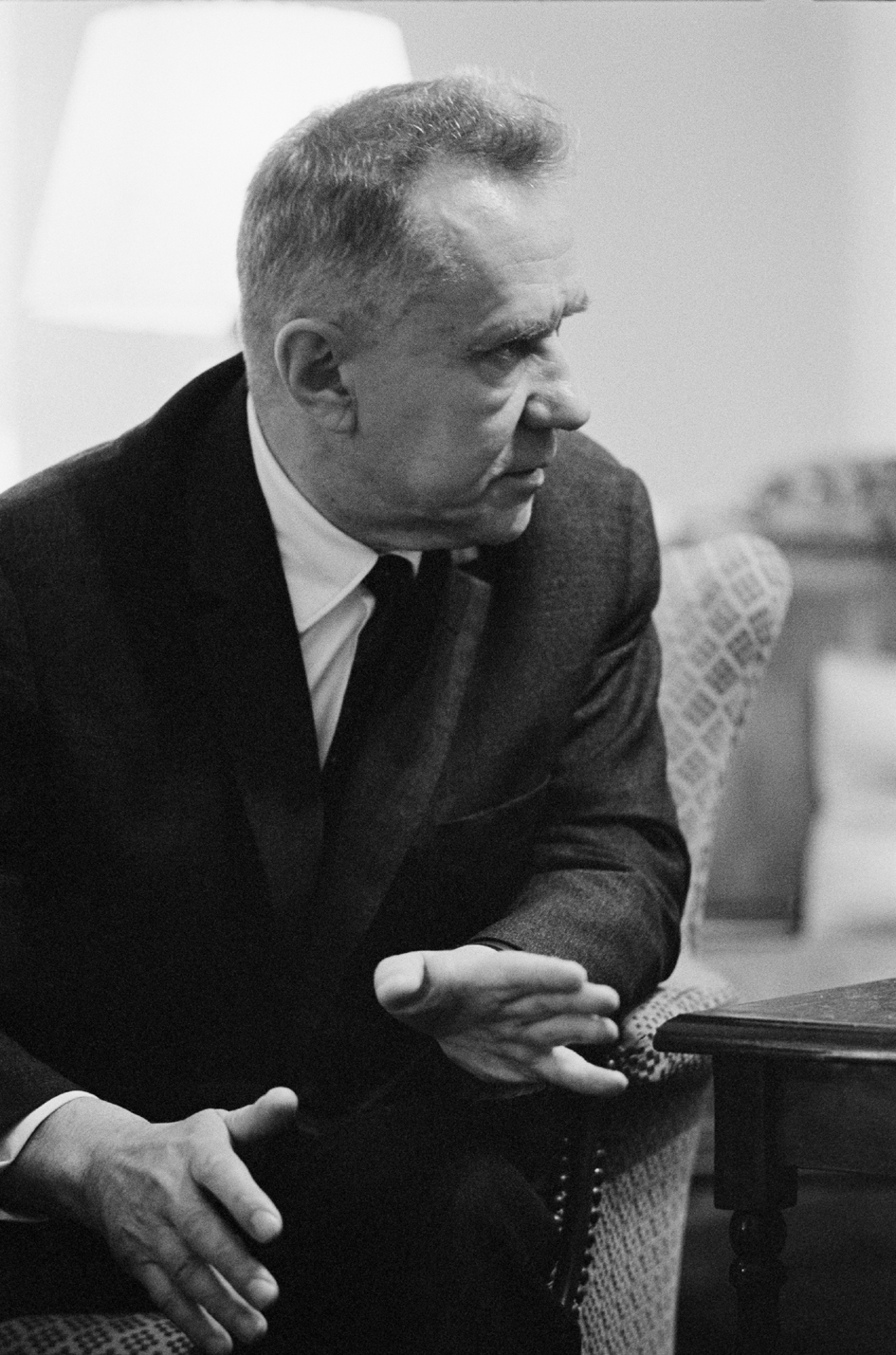
Scholars are generally unsure as to what effect the "Kosygin reform", named after its initiator Alexei Kosygin, had on economic growth.

Philip Hanson, author of The Rise and Fall of the Soviet economy: an Economic History of the USSR from 1945, claims that the label stagnation is not "entirely unfair". Brezhnev, according to Hanson, did preside over a period of slowdown in economic growth, but claims that the era started with good growth that was at a higher rate than during the end of Khrushchev's leadership. Economic slowdown began in 1973 "when even the official estimates began to show Soviet per capita production no longer closing the gap with the US." Before 1973, there was a reform period launched by Alexei Kosygin, which many believed would become as radical as those in the Socialist Republic of Czechoslovakia and the previous reform attempts in Hungary. According to Hanson, many assumed that growth during the Brezhnev era did not stop but started to stagnate. Not everything stagnated, as per capita consumption grew by 1.9% during the 1970s, which is a "highly respectable rate" of growth. Another point that Hanson makes is that, in contrast to the repressive policies of Joseph Stalin and instability-inducing policies of Khrushchev, the Brezhnev era was stable and a "period of (comparative) plenty".

Robert Vincent Daniels in his book, Russia's Transformation: Snapshots of a Crumbling System, claimed that the hallmark of the Brezhnev era was the status quo, which in turn led to the development of a great paradox; "the contradictions of what it was and what it could be became obvious". Net growth, in excess of 50% and as high as two thirds, was primarily in the urban sector resulting in high population growth and urban growth higher than that of the United States. Industrial development continued to grow rapidly, and in certain sectors surpassed the United States. As an example, coal production in the Soviet Union increased from 85 million metric tons in 1964 to 149 million metric tons in 1981 while in the United States it grew from 100 million to 130 million metric tons in the same period. The Soviet Union became the largest exporter of petroleum in the world and by the end of the Tenth Five-Year Plan (1976–1981) the Soviet GNP "reached about 60% of the American level, and the net current investment was actually greater in absolute terms". The failure then, according to Daniels, was that the Soviet economy was not able to deliver in certain sectors; agriculture is a sector where this failure occurred. Throughout Soviet history, deficiencies in agriculture and consumer goods always existed. During Brezhnev's reign, the Soviet Union became the largest producer of wheat in the world but was unable to produce meat in sufficient quantities. According to Daniels, the economy began to stagnate in 1975 rather than 1973 and that the following period contradicted the previous one "in almost every way".

The research in second economy of the Soviet Union, pioneered by Gregory Grossman, indicated that during the 1970s and 1980s the effects of the central planning were progressively distorted due to the rapid growth of the shadow economy. It is suggested that failure to account for it by Gosplan contributed to the stagnation, and ultimately to the collapse of the Soviet economy.

=== Causes ===
One of the suggested causes of stagnation was the increased military expenditure over consumer goods and other economic spheres. Andrei Sakharov, the veteran dissident, wrote in a 1980 letter to Brezhnev that the increasing expenditure on the armed forces was stalling economic growth. David Michael Kotz and Fred Weir, authors of Revolution from Above: The Demise of the Soviet System, argue that militarisation cannot be the prime cause for the economic stagnation, as military spending had historically been high (17% of GNP in 1950) and had increased on par with economic growth without previously destabilising the economy.

During the Nixon Shock and the 1973 oil crisis, economic growth in the rest of the world plummeted but the Soviet hard currency earnings grew as a result of oil exports. Following the crisis, overall economic activity decreased markedly in the Soviet Union, the Western Bloc and Japan, but in the Soviet Union it was much more pronounced. Kotz and Weir argued that ultimately, economic stagnation in the Soviet Union could only have been caused by internal problems rather than external.

Some Marxist–Leninist writers have argued that economic stagnation was a result of revisionism in Soviet economic policy during Khrushchev's leadership. According to authors like Harpal Brar, Khrushchev's de-Stalinization program was also used to implement economic reforms that would move the USSR away from central planning and towards market socialism.

=== Summary ===
Period	Growth rates		
Period	GNP (according to the CIA)	NMP (according to G. I. Khanin)	NMP (according to the USSR)
1960–1965	4.8	4.4	6.5
1965–1970	4.9	4.1	7.7
1970–1975	3.0	3.2	5.7
1975–1980	1.9	1.0	4.2
1980–1985	1.8	0.6	3.5
(Note: Many economists argue that the net material product (NMP), the Soviet version of the gross national product (GNP), contained distortions and could not accurately determine a country's economic growth. Because of this, several specialists created GNP figures to estimate Soviet growth rates and to compare Soviet growth rates with the growth rates of capitalist countries. Grigorii Khanin published his growth rates in the 1980s as a "translation" of NMP to GNP. His growth rates were (as seen above) much lower than the official figures, and lower than some Western estimates. After the dissolution of the Soviet Union in 1991, Khanin's estimates led several agencies criticise the estimates made by the Central Intelligence Agency (CIA). Since then, the CIA has generally been regarded as having overestimated Soviet growth. In response to the criticism of CIA's work, a panel led by economist James R. Millar, was established to check out if this was in fact true. The panel concluded that the CIA were based on facts, and that Khanin's approach was methodologically naive, as it has not been possible for others to reproduce his results. Growth figures for the Soviet economy vary widely (as seen below if compared to those at the table above): Eighth Five-Year Plan (1966–1970): Gross national product (GNP): 5.2%; GNP: 5.3%; Gross national income (GNI): 7.1%; Capital investments in agriculture: 24%; Ninth Five-Year Plan (1971–1975): GNP: 3.7%; GNI: 5.1%; Labour productivity: 6%; Capital investments in agriculture: 27%; Tenth Five-Year Plan (1976–1980): GNP: 2.7%; GNP: 3%; Labour productivity: 3.2%; Eleventh Five-Year Plan (1981–1985))

One of the main causes for Khrushchev's dismissal from power was the relatively poor economic growth during the early 1960s. Overall economic growth was 6% from 1951 to 1955 but had fallen to 5.8% in the subsequent 5 years and to 5% from 1961 to 1965. Labour productivity, which had grown 4.7% from the 1950s to 1962, had declined to 4% by the early 1960s. Growth, capital out and investments were all showing signs of steady decline. Another problem was Khrushchev's unrealistic promises such as committing to reach communism in 20 years, a near impossibility with the then-current economic indicators. Ultimately, as a result of his failure to deliver on his promises and the problems engendered, Khrushchev was dismissed in October 1964 by a collective leadership led by Leonid Brezhnev and Alexei Kosygin. To counter Khrushchev's promise of reaching communism, the Soviet leadership created the term developed socialism, which meant that the Soviet Union had developed to a sufficiently advanced stage that the country would move "naturally" to communism (in an unspecified amount of time).

Khrushchev's dismissal led to the establishment of a more conservative Politburo; Kosygin, Nikolai Podgorny and Andrei Kirilenko were the most liberal members, Brezhnev and Arvīds Pelše belonged to the moderate faction while Mikhail Suslov retained his leadership of the party's hardliners. Kosygin and Brezhnev strongly disagreed over economic policy; Kosygin wanted to increase investments in consumer goods and light industry whereas Brezhnev wanted to increase investment in heavy industry, agriculture and defence. In 1965, Kosygin introduced an economic reform, widely referred to as the "Kosygin reform", which aimed to reform the planned economy within a socialist framework. In a bid to improve the Soviet economy Kosygin copied some of the measures used in the Western Bloc, such as profit making, which Brezhnev agreed to as the Soviet economy was entering a period of low growth. Kosygin's reforms on agriculture gave considerable autonomy to the collective farms, giving them the right to the contents of private farming. As a result, during the Eighth Five-Year Plan (1966–1970), large-scale land reclamation programmes, construction of irrigation channels, and other measures, were enacted. (Note: According to Soviet statistics, there were significant improvements made in the economy during the Eighth Five-Year Plan (1966–1970). The economy grew by 7.7% during the Eighth Five-Year Plan but slowed during the Ninth Five-Year Plan (1971–1975) and Tenth Five-Year Plan (1976–1981) when the economy grew by 5.7 and 4.2, respectively.) Overall, the reform failed and links to any high growth rates during the Eighth Five-Year Plan are considered to be "tenuous".

The Brezhnev era, which had begun with high growth, began to stagnate some time in the early 1970s. Kosygin's "radical" reform attempts were halted in 1971 and his second reform was more modest. The second reform was halted because of the 1973 oil crisis, when an international increase in the price of oil prompted economic growth based on selling oil. Another reform was implemented in 1979 but this, too, failed as by this time the Soviet economy had become "addicted" to high oil prices.

== Anthropometric measures of stagnation ==
Per Elizabeth Brainerd, the average height and weight of newborns and adults in the Soviet Union consistently increased from 1940 to 1969, while the infant mortality rate decreased. These measures are a good proxy for standard of living as they are linked closely to "nutritional status in infancy, childhood and early adulthood". After 1970, however, the increase in child height "appeared to halt or possibly regress slightly in the early 1970s." Birth weights similarly declined after 1970. There were not significant gains in average adult heights during this period.

Starting in the 1970s there was a statistical increase in infant mortality rates, but there is some debate around whether the increase was from improved reporting or increased morbidity. Brainerd cites the increase in developed regions with complete reporting to show it was real. Life expectancy declined for men and stagnated for women. In 1965, "female life expectancy nearly equaled that of U.S. women and male life expectancy fell below that of U.S. men by only 2.5 years", but there was "a gap of nearly 8.5 years in life expectancy between Russian and U.S. men by 1980, and a gap of 4.3 years for women in that same year."

== Opposition ==
Acts of protest took place in reaction to the Warsaw Pact invasion of Czechoslovakia with protesters being dismissed from their jobs, beaten or arrested. Eight protesters held a demonstration in Red Square in Moscow and were subsequently imprisoned. A number of suspected dissidents had their homes and property searched and a group of Moscow lawyers specialized in defending people charged with anti-Soviet activity. Supporters of these meetings and demonstrations claimed that the arrests were illegal, because there is no criminality in the realization of the human right to obtain and distribute information. They asserted this right was part of the Universal Declaration of Human Rights (1948) and the final act of the Conference on Security and Co-operation in Europe (1975).

Throughout the Brezhnev Era, artists producing work in accordance with "Soviet values" within the framework of socialist realism constituted a well-paid, elite group that enjoyed an easy life and high social status. Nevertheless, open and clandestine political opposition to the authorities by some Soviet scientists and artists (collectively known as "the dissidents") persisted from the Khrushchev Era. Prominent nuclear physicist Andrey Sakharov and Soviet Army General Pyotr Grigorenko were well-known representatives of this movement. When details of the Brezhnev government's efforts to suppress the speech of political dissidents came to light via the glasnost policies of the Gorbachev Era, many writers claimed to have been unaware of its widespread use. Conversely, many members of the Soviet intelligentsia had systematically criticized the social and moral manifestations of the Stagnation without overtly challenging the authorities. Examples include writers Viktor Astafyev and Oles Honchar, playwright Grigory Gorin, and directors Eldar Ryazanov and Mark Zakharov.

== See also ==
- History of the Soviet Union (1964–1982) – Brezhnev Era
- Post–World War II economic expansion
- Predictions of the collapse of the Soviet Union
- Hypernormalisation, term coined by Alexei Yurchak

Preceded by Khrushchev Thaw	History of Russia; History of the Soviet Union; 14 October 1964 – 10 March 1985	Succeeded by Perestroika
