= Kosygin (disambiguation) =

Alexei Kosygin (1904–1980) was a Soviet Premier.

Kosygin may also refer to:

- Kosygin Moscow State Textile University

== People with the surname ==
- Yuri Kosygin, a character in Oz

== See also ==
- Kosygin reform or the 1965 Soviet economic reform
- 1979 Soviet economic reform or Kosygin reform
