= Legacy of Leonid Brezhnev =

Impact of leader of the Soviet Union

The full understanding of the history of the late Soviet Union and of its successor, the Russian Federation, requires the assessment of the legacy of Leonid Brezhnev, the third General Secretary of the Central Committee of the Communist Party of the Soviet Union (CPSU) and twice Chairman of the Presidium of the Supreme Soviet. Leonid Brezhnev was the leader of the CPSU from 1964 until his death in 1982, whose eighteen-year tenure has been recognized for developing the most powerful military, and for social and economic stagnation in the late Soviet Union.

While his rule provided stability to his country and increased the standard of living, there was also a heritage of political and personal values. When Brezhnev died he left behind a gerontocracy, a group of leaders who were significantly older than most of the adult population. Despite his failures in domestic reforms, his foreign affairs and defence policies consolidated the position of the Union of Soviet Socialist Republics (USSR) as a superpower. His popularity among the citizenry waned during his last years, and the Soviet people's belief in communism and Marxism–Leninism slowly withered away but support still continued to be evident, even on the eve of his death. Following his death, political wrangling led to harsh criticism of both him and his family. Mikhail Gorbachev, the last Soviet leader, drew support from communists and the Soviet population by criticising Brezhnev's rule, and referred to his rule as the "Era of Stagnation". Nevertheless, Brezhnev has received consistently high approval ratings in the public polls.

== Immediate legacy ==
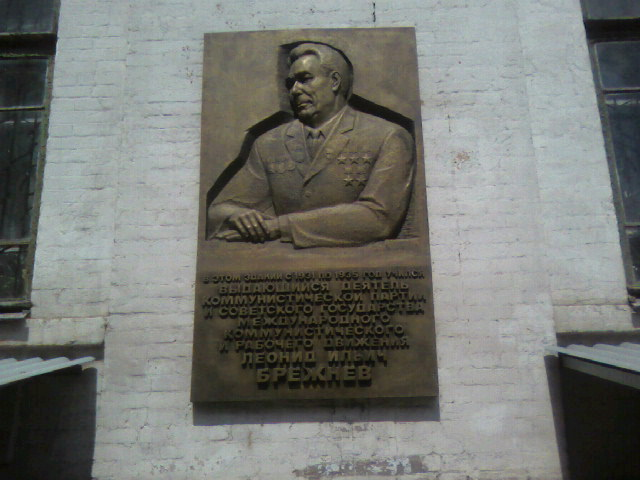
A Brezhnev plaque mounted on the wall of the University of Dneprodzerzhinsk

When Leonid Brezhnev died on 10 November 1982 Yuri Andropov was elected chairman of the committee in charge of managing his funeral. According to Time magazine Brezhnev's death was mourned by the majority of Soviet citizens. First World commentators saw this as proof that Andropov would become Brezhnev's successor as general secretary. Corruption in the Soviet Union which had grown considerably during Brezhnev's tenure had become a major problem to the Soviet Union's economic development by the 1980s. In response Andropov initiated a nationwide anti-corruption campaign. Andropov believed that the Soviet economy would possibly recover if the Soviet Government was able to increase social discipline amongst workers. Brezhnev's regime was also criticised for ideological laxness and self-indulgence. The gerontocracy established by Brezhnev was slowly phased out by Andropov, and new recruits were appointed to the Party "centre", such as future Premier Nikolai Ryzhkov and Chief Ideologue Yegor Ligachev. Soviet foreign policy had also gone awry during Brezhnev's last years, and by June 1982, just before his death, Ronald Reagan classified the Soviet Union as an "Evil Empire". This hardline diplomatic stance did not wither away before Mikhail Gorbachev initiated the "New Thinking". Support for Marxism–Leninism continued to be evident amongst the Soviet people, however, its base of support slowly withered during the Brezhnev Era. The Soviet people still remained wary of such concepts as liberal democracy and multi-party systems, and because of it, Marxism–Leninism remained the leading belief in the country. Due to the large military buildup of the 1960s the Soviet Union was able to consolidate itself as a superpower during Brezhnev's rule.

Brezhnev's family, Yuri, Galina and Yuri Churbanov, were investigated and both Yuris were arrested on charges of political corruption during Mikhail Gorbachev's administration. Churbanov, Brezhnev's son-in-law, was sentenced to twelve years in prison on charges of large-scale embezzlement and corruption. By December 1988 Churbanov had been stripped of all state honours, and sent to a labour camp. Galina, along with the rest of Brezhnev's family, lost all their state privileges. The city of Brezhnev reverted to its old name Naberezhnye Chelny, and a group within the Soviet leadership wanted to rename all towns, street, factories and institutions bearing Brezhnev's name. This was actually carried through by the authorities in December 1988 when the Soviet Government issued a decree which stated all town, streets, factories, institutions and the like bearing Brezhnev's and Konstantin Chernenko's were to revert to their former name. According to his grandson Andrei Brezhnev, the very name Brezhnev had become a curse for the family, and several family members had been forced out of their jobs and their friends had deserted them. Brezhnev, who had inflated his role in World War II, was rescinded the Order of Victory on 21 September 1989 in a Supreme Soviet convocation.

During the Gorbachev Era, Brezhnev's rule was considered less successful than that of Joseph Stalin; in an opinion measurement poll only 7 percent chose the Brezhnev Era as good, while 10 percent picked the Stalin Era as good. Following the dissolution of the Soviet Union and Boris Yeltsin's subsequent market reforms, many Russians viewed the Brezhnev era with nostalgia; they missed the stability of that era which had subsequently been lost during the Gorbachev era.

== Historical assessments ==
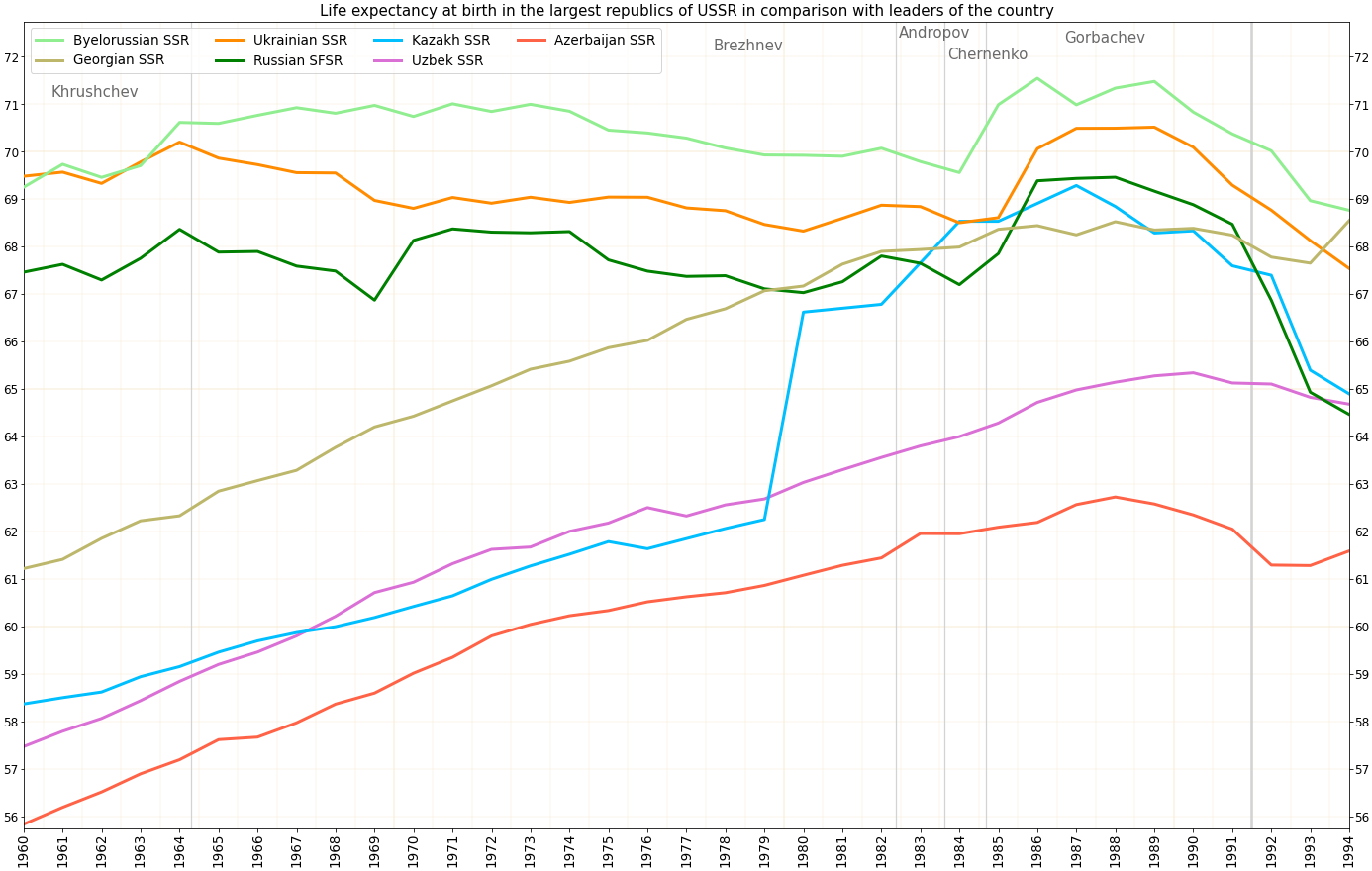
Graph of change of life expectancy in the largest republics of USSR under Brezhnev

Historians have expressed a range of views for Brezhnev and his rule. The scholarly literature dealing with him is scarce and, with the exception of the period immediately after his death, overwhelmingly negative. Very little has been written about Brezhnev in English, and even Russian. According to Mark Sandle and Edwin Bacon, the authors behind Brezhnev Reconsidered, Brezhnev attracted little attention from the media due to a consensus that came shortly after his death, namely that his rule was primarily one of stagnation. When Mikhail Gorbachev, the last Soviet leader, initiated perestroika he blamed the degradation of the Soviet economic and political system on Brezhnev, and called his rule the "Era of Stagnation". Gorbachev claimed that Brezhnev followed "a fierce neo-Stalinist line", although in a later statement Gorbachev made assurances that Brezhnev was not as bad as he was made out to be, saying, "Brezhnev was nothing like the cartoon figure that is made of him now".

British historian Robert Service wrote in his book, Russia: From Tsarism to the Twenty-First Century, that "When he [Brezhnev] succeeded Khrushchev, he was still a vigorous politician who expected to make the Party and government work more effectively. He had not been inactive; he had not been entirely inflexible. But his General Secretaryship had turned into a ceremonial reign that had brought communism into its deepest contempt since 1917." He added that it was "hard to feel very sorry for Brezhnev"; his socio-economic policies had sent the country into an Era of Stagnation from which his successors were never able to fully recover. Talal Nizameddin states in his book Russia and the Middle East: Towards A New Foreign Policy that "Brezhnev's legacy, generally unaffected by his weak successors (Yuri Andropov and Konstantin Chernenko), was entanglement in Afghanistan, tension with China and Japan, as well as the prospect of a new dimension to the arms race with the United States in the form of the Strategic Defense Initiative (Star Wars)." According to historian David Dyker in his book The Soviet Union under Gorbachev: Prospects for Reform "Brezhnev left his successors a Soviet Union suffering from a host of domestic and foreign problems". The biggest obstacle, according to Dyker, was the weakness of the economy which had undermined Soviet influence outside its borders considerably during the late Brezhnev due to its relative technological backwardness.

The author of The Soviet Paradox: External Expansion, Internal Decline Seweryn Bialer has a more mixed assessment of Brezhnev's reign. Bialer notes that the era was a time of "lost opportunities", but admits that the economic growth during Brezhnev's first years weakened "the rationale for radical reform". However, as Bialer notes in his book, even the gerontocracy which Brezhnev himself had created were disillusioned with Brezhnev's leadership when he died in 1982. In his book Russia's Transformation: Snapshots of a Crumbling System Robert Vincent Daniels argues that Brezhnev "gave the country stability, if nothing else, even though it was the stability of the police state", and that his domestic and external policies tried to ensure the "status quo". Daniels believes that Brezhnev's reign can be separated into two parts, the first, starting in 1964 and ending in 1975 conforms to a "status quo leadership, building the economy, pursuing détente, and maintaining political equilibrium at home". The second phase, which began in 1975, was exactly the opposite; the economy stopped growing, the collective leadership ended with Nikolai Podgorny's removal, Brezhnev developed a cult of personality and the Soviet Union itself started to stagnate. Historians Jiří Valenta and Frank Cibulka noted in their book Gorbachev's New Thinking and Third World Conflicts that Brezhnev's legacy was a "mixture of achievements and failures in both domestic and foreign policy". However, they argue that by the time of his death his failures had become severe chronic systematic problems. Brezhnev's main achievements, according to Valenta and Cibulka, was his foreign and defense policies, however, with the economy in decline these achievements were not durable in the long-run. They also note that the Soviet Union was able to consolidate itself as a superpower, which in turn increased their influence in non-communist Third World countries.

On a positive note, Ian Thatcher argues that "[r]ather than deserving a reputation as the most vilified of all Soviet leaders, Brezhnev should be praised as one of the most successful exponents of the art of Soviet politics." He argues that Brezhnev was a good politician within the framework of the Soviet political system. Dmitry Peskov said "Brezhnev wasn't a minus for the history of our country, he was a huge plus, he laid a foundation for the country's economics and agriculture." Archie Brown wrote in his book, The Rise & Fall of Communism, that "From the point of view of Communist rulers, the Brezhnev era was in many ways successful." Brown adds that the Soviet Union reached "rough parity with the United States" militarily by the early 1970s, and became a superpower in the military sense of the world. According to Brown "The Brezhnev era was a time when tens of millions of Soviet citizens lived a peaceful and predictable life than hitherto" and where "Most people did not live in fear of the KGB."

Donald J Raleigh draws a mixed message, depicting a regime that entered strong and left weak:

Brezhnev came to power in a country eager for stability. Under Brezhnev, the Soviet people experienced a dramatic rise in their standard of living. They took pride in their country's status as a global superpower and in Brezhnev's role as the architect of détente, a relaxation in cold-war tensions with the United States. The Soviet economy did stagnate during his tenure, however, after he rejected attempts to decentralize it, giving rise not only to episodic shortages of consumer goods but also to deficits in the Soviet “myth economy,” which bred cynicism.

== Opinion polls ==
=== Russia ===
Brezhnev has fared well in Russian opinion polls when compared to his successors and predecessors. However, in the West he is most commonly remembered for starting the economic stagnation which triggered the dissolution of the Soviet Union. A 2000 poll by VTsIOM asked various Russians the question "Was a given period more positive or more negative for the country?". 36 percent of the people polled viewed Brezhnev's tenure as more positive than negative. His predecessor, Nikita Khrushchev trailed close behind him, earning 33 percent. A poll by the Public Opinion Fund (VTsIOM) in September 1999 similarly chose the Brezhnev period as the time in the 20th century when "ordinary people lived best", having a clear majority of 51 to 10. In a similar poll done in 1994, Brezhnev garnered a majority of only 36 to 16. According to a 2006 Public Opinion Fund poll, 61 percent of the Russian people viewed the Brezhnev era as good for the country. A poll by the VTsIOM in 2007 showed that the majority of Russians would choose to live during the Brezhnev era over any other period of 20th-century Russian history. Researchers have noted a surge in Brezhnev's popularity, along with other communist rulers, during and after the 1998 Russian financial crisis, which is well remembered by many Russians for plunging many into poverty. When comparing these two periods, Brezhnev's USSR is best remembered for stability in prices and income by the Russians and not the socio-economic stagnation for which he is remembered in the West.

Brezhnev's top-ranked popularity has continued well into the 21st century. In 2013, 56 percent of respondents expressed positive feelings in a poll by Russia's Levada Center. He scored a bit ahead of Lenin, (55 percent). Stalin (54 percent), Tsar Nicholas II (48 percent), and Khrushchev (45 percent). Trailing far behind in "positive feelings" were Mikhail Gorbachev (20 percent) and Boris Yeltsin (22 percent).

=== Ukraine ===
In a 2018 Rating Sociological Group poll, 47% of respondents had a positive opinion of Brezhnev. Brezhnev narrowly beat the popularity of Peter the Great (43% had a positive attitude towards him). Brezhnev's popularity was lagging far behind Bohdan Khmelnytsky (73% of respondents expressed a positive attitude) and Mykhailo Hrushevsky (68% positive attitude).

== Bibliography ==
- Brown, Archie (2009). The Rise & Fall of Communism. Bodley Head. ISBN 978-0061138799.
- Bacon, Edwin; Sandle, Mark (2002). Brezhnev Reconsidered. Palgrave Macmillan. ISBN 978-0333794630.
- Bialer, Seweryn (1986). The Soviet Paradox: External Expansion, Internal Decline. I.B.Tauris. ASIN B000IX2J6M.
- Chaney, Otto Preston (1996). Zhukov (2 ed.). University of Oklahoma Press. ISBN 978-0806128078.
- Churbanov, Alexander (2001). Russia's Bitter Path to Modernity: A History of the Soviet and post-Soviet Eras. Continuum International Publishing Group. ISBN 978-0826413505.
- Daniels, Robert Vincent (1998). Russia's Transformation: Snapshots of a Crumbling System. Rowman & Littlefield. ISBN 978-0847687091.
- Dyker, David (1987). The Soviet Union under Gorbachev: Prospects for Reform. Routledge. ISBN 978-0709945192.
- Fainberg, Dina, et al. Reconsidering Stagnation in the Brezhnev Era: Ideology and Exchange (2016)
- Kort, Michael (2010). The Soviet Colossus: History and Aftermath. M.E. Sharpe. ISBN 978-0-7656-2387-4.
- Nizameddin, Talal (1999). Russia and the Middle East: Towards a new Foreign Policy. Palgrave Macmillan. ISBN 978-0312225384.
- Raleigh, Donald J., ed. Russia's Favorite: Leonid Il'ich Brezhnev, 1964-82 (ME Sharpe, 2014).
  - Raleigh, Donald J. "Russia's Favorite: Reevaluating the Rule of Leonid Il'ich Brezhnev, 1964-82: Guest Editor's Introduction." Russian Studies in History 52.4 (2014): 3–11.
  - Dönninghaus, Victor, and Andrei Savin. "Leonid Brezhnev." Russian Studies in History 52#4 (2014), pp 71–93.
- Service, Robert (2009). History of Modern Russia: From Tsarism to the Twenty-first Century (3 ed.). Penguin Books Ltd. ISBN 978-0674034938.
- Staar, Richard Felix (1991). Foreign Policies of the Soviet Union (1 ed.). Hoover Institution Press. ISBN 978-0817991029.
- Ward, Christopher J. Brezhnev's Folly: The Building of BAM and Late Soviet Socialism (2009). the Baikal–Amur Mainline Railway project (BAM) was the most important industrial project of the Brezhnev era. Ward says it was a massive, corrupt failure.
- White, Stephen (1993). After Gorbachev. Cambridge University Press. ISBN 978-0521458962.
- White, Stephen (2000). Russia's New Politics: The Management of a Postcommunist Society. Cambridge University Press. ASIN B003QI0DQE.
- Valenta, Jiří; Cibulka, Frank (1990). Gorbachev's New Thinking and Third World Conflicts. Transaction Publishers. ISBN 978-0887382123.
