= Khanin (surname) =

Notable people with surname Khanin (Cyrillic: Ханин) include:

- Dov Khanin (born 1958), Israeli political scientist, lawyer, and former member of the Knesset
- Grigorii Khanin (born 1937), Russian economist
- Konstantin Khanin, contemporary Russian mathematician and physicist
- Yuri Khanin, contemporary Russian composer
