= 1979 economic reform =

1979 economic reform may refer to:

- China's reform and opening up that started in 1979
- 1979 Soviet economic reform
