= 1965 Soviet economic reform =

Attempt to introduce indicative planning, profits and sales to Soviet firms

A propaganda poster promoting the reform. The poster reads; "We are forging the keys of happiness'!"

The 1965 Soviet economic reform, sometimes called the Kosygin reform (Russian: Косыгинская реформа) or Liberman reform, named after E.G. Liberman, was a set of planned changes in the economy of the USSR. A centerpiece of these changes was the introduction of profitability and sales as the two key indicators of enterprise success. Some of an enterprise's profits would go to three funds, used to reward workers and expand operations; most would go to the central budget.

The reforms were introduced politically by Alexei Kosygin—who had just become Premier of the Soviet Union following the removal of Nikita Khrushchev—and ratified by the Central Committee in September 1965. They reflected some long-simmering wishes of the USSR's mathematically-oriented economic planners, and initiated the shift towards increased decentralization in the process of economic planning. The reforms, coinciding with the Eighth Five-Year Plan, led to continued growth of the Soviet economy. The success of said reforms was short-lived, and with the events of Prague in 1968, fueled by Moscow's implementation of the reforms in Eastern Bloc countries, led to the reforms being curtailed. Economists like Lev Gatovsky and Liberman were instrumental in framing the theoretical underpinnings of the Soviet economic reforms of the 1960s, advocating for the use of profit motives and market mechanisms within a socialist framework.

== Background ==
Under Lenin, the New Economic Policy had allowed and used the concepts of profit and incentives for regulation of the Soviet economy. Stalin transformed this policy rapidly with the collectivization of farms and nationalization of industry, which was the result of the acceleration of central planning as exemplified by the "Five-Year Plans". Since about 1930, the Soviet Union had used a centralized system to manage its economy. In this system, a single bureaucracy created economic plans, which assigned workers to jobs, set wages, dictated resource allocation, established the levels of trade with other countries, and planned the course of technological progress. Retail prices for consumer goods were fixed at levels intended for market clearing. The prices of wholesale goods were fixed, also, but these served an accounting function more than a market mechanism. Collective farms also paid centrally determined prices for the supplies they needed, and unlike other sectors their workers received wages directly dependent on the profitability of the operation.

Although Soviet enterprises were theoretically governed by the principle of khozraschet (Russian: хозрасчёт, lit. 'business bookkeeping', or "accounting")—which required them to meet planners' expectations within the system of set prices for their inputs and outputs—they had little control over the biggest decisions affecting their operations. Managers did have a responsibility to plan future gross output, which they chronically underestimated in order to later exceed the prediction. The managers then received bonuses (premia) for surplus product regardless of whether it was produced in a cost-effective manner or whether their enterprise was profitable overall. The bonuses for output came in amounts sometimes equal to the managers' base salaries. The system also incentivized pointless increases in the size, weight, and cost of production outputs, simply because "more" had been produced.

=== Rise of the optimal planners ===
The economic reforms emerged during a period of great ideological debate over economic planning. More mathematical, "cybernetic", viewpoints were at first considered deviant from orthodox Marxist economics, which considered the value of goods to derive strictly from labor. This doctrine, elaborated in such works as Stalin's 1952 book, Economic Problems of Socialism in the USSR, described the price system as a capitalist relic which would eventually disappear from communist society.

Nevertheless, computerized economics gained an important role for top planners, even while conventional Marxist–Leninist political economy was taught in most schools and promoted for public consumption. The rising influence of statistical planning in the Soviet economy was reflected in the creation of the Central Economic Mathematical Institute (Центральный экономико-математический институт; TSEMI), led by Vasily Sergeevich Nemchinov. Nemchinov, along with linear programming inventor Leonid Kantorovich and investment analyst Viktor Valentinovich Novozhilov, received the Lenin Prize in 1965. The battle between "optimal" planning and convention planning raged throughout the 1960s.

Another tendency in economic planning emphasized "normative value of processing", or the importance of needs and wants in evaluating the value of production.

=== Kosygin and Brezhnev replace Khrushchev ===
Major changes throughout the Soviet world became possible in 1964 with the ousting of Nikita Khrushchev and the rise of Alexei Kosygin and Leonid Brezhnev. Economic policy was a significant area of retrospective anti-Khrushchev criticism in the Soviet press. This 'reformist' economic tendency in the Soviet Union had corollaries and some mutual reinforcement in Eastern Europe.

Kosygin criticized the inefficiency and inertia of economic policy under the previous administration. He presented a plan, including the ideas expressed by Liberman and Nemchinov, to the Communist Party Central Committee Plenum in September 1965. The Central Committee's acceptance of the plan became crucial for practical implementation of theoretical ideas.

== Rationale ==
=== Lack of incentives ===
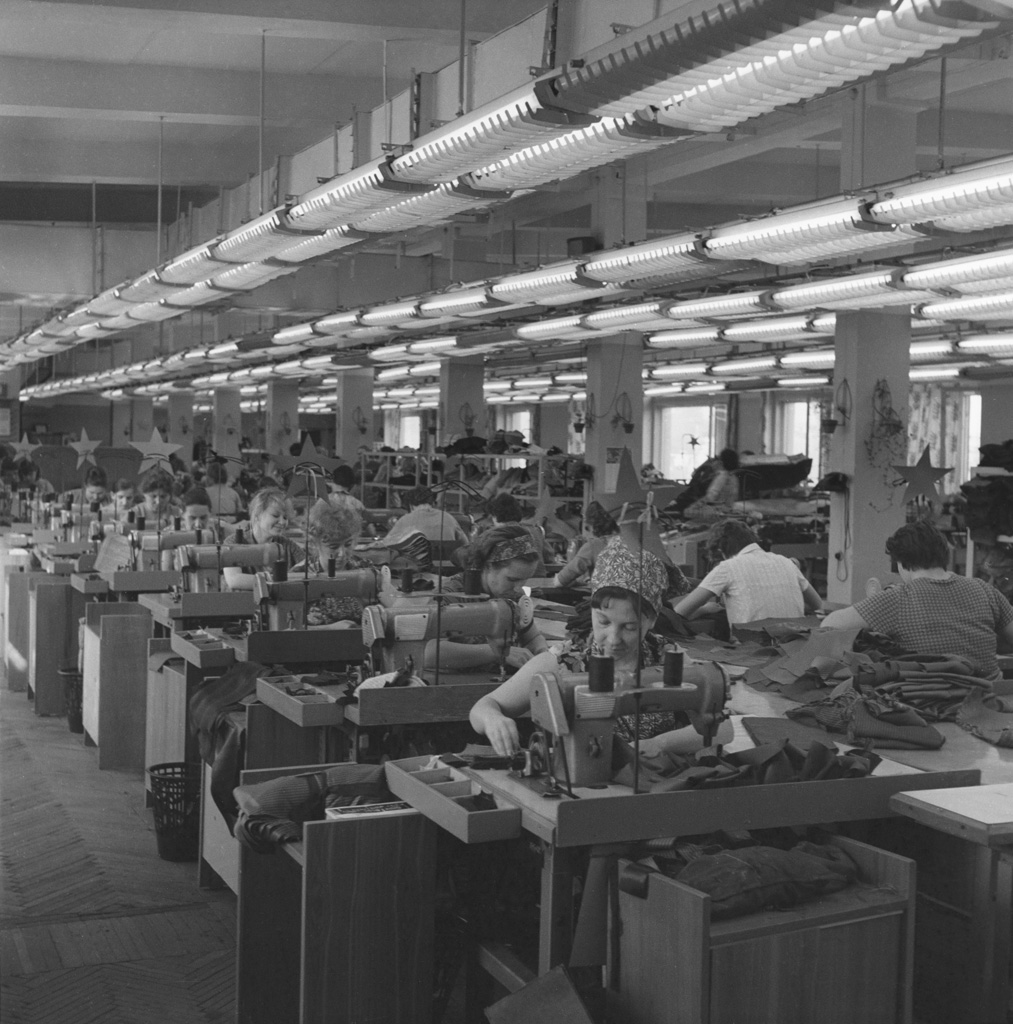
Day-to-day operations in 1967 at the economically reformed Bolshevichka clothing factory in Moscow—a pioneer of the new economic policy

According to official rationale for the reform, the increasing complexity of economic relations reduced the efficacy of economic planning and therefore reduced economic growth. It was recognized that the existing system of planning did not motivate enterprises to reach high rates of production or to introduce organizational or technical innovations. There were no incentives for that.

Given more freedom to deviate publicly from party orthodoxy, newspapers offered new proposals for the Soviet economy. Aircraft engineer O. Antonov published an article in Izvestia on November 22, 1961, with the title "For All and For Oneself"—advocating more power for enterprise directors.

=== Liberman's proposals ===
A widely publicized economic rationale for reform came from Evsei Liberman of the Kharkov Institute of Engineering and Economics. An article by Liberman on this topic, titled "Plans, Profits, and Bonuses" appeared in Pravda in September 1962. Liberman, influenced by the economic "optimizers", argued for the (re)introduction of profitability as a core economic indicator. Liberman advanced the idea that the social interest could be advanced through careful setting of microeconomic parameters: "What is profitable for society should be profitable for every enterprise."

These proposals were controversial, and criticized especially as regressions towards a capitalist economic system. Critics also argued that reliance on profitability would skew the proportions in which different goods were produced.

V. Trapeznikov advocated a position similar to Liberman's, in Pravda, August 1964, writing that

[...] the time has come to discard the obsolete forms of economic management based on directive norms, and to pass over to a simpler, cheaper and more efficient type of control of the activities of enterprises. This control must be patterned so that the personnel of an enterprise find it economically profitable to organize that work along lines that are profitable to the national economy as well.

Unlike Liberman in 1962, Trapeznikov suggested that the need for reform had been embraced by party decisionmakers and would soon become a reality. In the following month, Pravda published six more articles from academicians, planners, and managers advocating reform. The last of these came from Liberman. This time, criticism was muted.

Several economic experiments were initiated to test Liberman's proposals. These began in 1964 with new policies for two garment factories: the Bolshevichka in Moscow and the Mayak in Gorky. When operations at the garment factories proved tolerably successful, the experiment was expanded to about 400 other enterprises, mostly in large cities. One experiment in Lviv involved a coal mine and factories producing clothing, shoes, and heavy lifting equipment. The coal mine, in particular, reportedly became more profitable after shifting to a system using bonuses and more independent decisionmaking. Some of the experimental plants ran into problems, however, due to the unreliability of suppliers continuing to operate on the old system. The Mayak plant faced a dilemma in trying to implement the centrally mandated experimental reforms, while simultaneously receiving contradictory orders from the local sovnarkhoz (regional council).

== Design ==
The reform was administered by the Central Committee of the Communist Party of the Soviet Union and the Council of Ministers. It consisted of five "groups of activities":

1. The enterprises became main economic units.
2. The number of policy targets was reduced from 30 to 9 (the rest remained indicators). The big nine were: total output at current wholesale prices, the most important products in physical units, the total payroll, total profits and profitability, expressed as the ratio of profit to fixed assets and working capital normalized; payments to the budget and appropriations from the budget; total capital investment targets for the introduction of new technology; and the volume of supply of raw materials and equipment.
3. Economic independence of enterprises. Enterprises were required to determine the detailed range and variety of products, using their own funds to invest in production, establish long-term contractual arrangements with suppliers and customers and to determine the number of personnel.
4. Key importance was attributed to the integral indicators of economic efficiency of production — profits and profitability. There was the opportunity to create a number of funds based on the expense of profits — funds for the development of production, material incentives, housing, etc. The enterprise was allowed to use the funds at its discretion.
5. Pricing: Wholesale sales prices would be recalibrated to reflect costs and encourage economic efficiency.

=== Profits, bonuses, and wages ===
The most important changes resulting from the Liberman/Kosygin reforms involved the role of profit in the Soviet economic system. Rentabelnost' ("profitability", Russian: рентабельность) and realizatsiya ("sales", Russian: реализация) became the twin success indicators for enterprises. Rentabelnost' was defined in terms of the ratio between profits and capital, while realizatsiya (also meaning "implementation") depended on the total volume of sales. Success by these measurements led to the allocation of money to a fund, which could be disbursed according to a pre-defined sequence. The funds first went to pay for capital—including interest paid to Gosbank, the State Bank. Then, they went to the new incentive funds. Finally, they could be used by an enterprise to expand its capital for operations. Any profit extending above the maximum for spending would go to the central budget.

The three "incentive" funds were:

1. The material incentive fund (MIF): money for cash bonuses to workers of profitable enterprises;
2. The socio-cultural and housing fund (SCF): A fund for social and cultural programming; and
3. The production development fund (PDF): A 'development' fund for the overall organization.

Formerly, bonuses had come from the same fund as wages. Now, enterprise managers had slightly more discretion over how to allocate them. They could move some amounts of money between the bonus fund and the social welfare fund. They also had more power to influence wages by classifying different workers.

In practice, the bonuses had the greatest impact on the payment of elite personnel (technicians and "employees" as opposed to "workers"), thereby counteracting the effect of Khrushchev-era wage reforms.

An experimental system introduced at some enterprises offered extra bonuses for specific achievements—not just as a portion of total profits. For example, engineers using fuel more efficiently (during a shortage) could receive large premia calculated as a percentage of the money they saved.

Along with more direct responsibility for the wage fund, enterprises also gained the power to fire workers. In fact, the reform gave new incentive for layoffs, which in some cases could increase profitability. (When these occurred, the workers did not have a 'social safety net' in place in the form of unemployment insurance and career assistance).

=== Enterprise accounting ===
To encourage accurate planning, enterprises now would be punished for performing below or above their planned goals.

Enterprises would also pay rent for land and natural resources. The rationale for this practice was economic optimization. For example, land of differing quality required different inputs of manpower to achieve the same outputs, and thus should factor differently into the budget of an enterprise.

Bank loans, to be repaid later with interest, would be used to fund more investment projects—to incentive the careful use of funds and the speedy creation of profit. Five different interest rates would be set, ranging from preferential to normal to punitive.

An additional capital charge—i.e., tax—would be assessed for each enterprise based on the capital it retained: working capital, equipment, and surplus stocks.

=== More enterprise control over investment decisions ===
Enterprises were to submit annual plans, called tekhpromfinplans (from Russian: техпромфинплан (ru:Техпрофинплан) - technical and financial production plan), stipulating production plans by quarter and month. Higher-ups would then approve these plans (or not) and allocate supplies and money. The enterprise then sells its products, within the constraints of the plan. It is empowered to reject or return (within ten days) unneeded inputs to the supplier.

The key change which represented "decentralization" was the delegation of responsibility over modernization investments. However, modernization plans remained subject to central approval, as well as approval from the bank which lent the money.

The amount of development expected under these auspices fell far short of expectations, as the necessary labour and materials were simply undersupplied. One response to this problem in 1969 was to shift more incentives to the contractors.

For the "optimal planners" this limited decentralization was inadequate, and the new importance assigned to "profit" was incomplete because enterprises did not control enough of the factors which might affect it. As a deputy director of TSEMI commented in 1966:

We say: comrades, if you want to introduce profit, then it is necessary to reconstruct the whole system of prices, the system of incentives, in short, to alter a great deal in the existing forms and methods of economic management. If this is not done, then the introduction of profit will bring about no effect whatsoever.

The plan also called for the cultivation of a new breed of managers; As Kosygin in Pravda (September 28, 1965):

...initiative based on know-how, efficiency, a businesslike approach, a feeling for the new, and the ability to use production resources in each specific circumstance with maximum effectiveness, herein is the essence of the new demands.

=== Political reorganization ===
In previous eras, an important layer of administrative control over production had been sovnarkhozy (совнархо́зы, a contraction of words meaning "Council of National Economy"), the regional economic councils created on December 1, 1917, under the control of the Supreme Soviet of the National Economy (VSNKh, Vesenkha, a similar contraction). These councils spelled the end of a short-lived phase of worker control over production, which the Bolsheviks regarded as inefficient. Under the New Economic Policy beginning in 1921, enterprises were classified based on their relative interdependence (and necessity to war production) or autonomy (i.e. those "endowed with complete financial and commercial independence"). The many enterprises in the latter category were not nationalized, but instead placed under the guidance of the VSNKh, with the plan to group them into "trusts" based on production chains or geographic proximity. This model underwent various reorganizations, including the strengthening of edinonachalie, control of production units by a single manager. These single managers at times controlled a wide range of production activities within a single area. The economic reform of 1957 reintroduced the sovnarkhozy, 104 in number, to govern production by region. Where applicable, these corresponded closely with the boundaries of the oblasty (political jurisdictions). Complaints immediately arose that these councils did not optimize overall production chains, due to their regional focus, and that they conflicted with the authority of Gosplan. In 1962, the 104 sovnarkhozy were consolidated into 47 larger jurisdictions (one of which controlled all of Uzbekistan, Turkmenistan, Tadzhikistan, and Kirgizia). However, by 1962–1963, the sovnarkhozy were becoming subordinate to numerous other agencies and organizations. Gosplan was to be stripped of its planning authority in favor of a revitalized VSNKh.

Kosygin took aim at these "outdated forms of management" and included in his 1965 speech a return to ministries as core administrators. His plan resembled the ministry system under Stalin, but with a smaller number: nine all-Union ministries organized by industry (e.g., Ministry of Light Industry, Ministry of the Radio Industry, Ministry of the Chemical Industry) and eleven supervising operations within each union-republic. The latter regional agencies reported both to the local council and to the central ministry with jurisdiction over their production type. Gosplan had the responsibility for creating annual and long-term plans, and for guiding development and resource management. Gossnab became the primary coordinator of material-technical supply, and was charged with large-scale analysis (possibly using computers) to increase supply chain efficiency.

The 1965 reforms somewhat altered the role of the Party in economic administration. Local officials were to oversee operations from a distance to ensure compliance with the spirit of the reforms.

=== Refinement of central planning ===
The plan called for more detailed and scientific central planning, including annual targets. These plans would be calculated using computer systems.

Distribution of supplies and products would take place in different ways. Central planners would allocate certain scarce and vital goods. For others, enterprises could form "direct ties" within which they developed a contractual exchange relationship.

== Implementation ==
The authors of the reforms knew from the outset that changes would take effect gradually, based on the careful writing of plans through the years 1966 and 1967. The first 43 enterprises, along with several "experiments" for which planning began before the September 1965 Plenum, shifted to the new model at the beginning of 1966. Transfer of another 180–200 was accomplished in early 1966. These were already profitable, well-positioned businesses, and reflected well on the reform in early evaluations. On July 1, 1966, 430 more enterprises were transferred; these included some large operations and themselves constituted 12% of total production. By the end of 1966, more than 704 enterprises had switched.

The Eighth Five-Year Plan would have instantiated some of the proposed reforms. (The Five-Year Plan dealt with a broad range of issues, with more of a focus on people's overall living conditions. It was expected to be implemented within the Party.)

Most light industry was to transfer at the beginning of 1967. The remaining enterprises to switch over in two stages, taking effect on July 1, 1967, and January 1, 1968. The complete transfer of all enterprises proceeded steadily, if not exactly on schedule. By April 1, 1967, 2,500 enterprises, responsible for 20% of output, had switched. By the end of the year, 7,000 industrial enterprises (out of 45,000), 1,500 trucking firms (out of 4,100), and all 25 railroad systems had transferred. Together these made up the backbone of Soviet industry. They were followed by smaller enterprises: 11,000 more in 1968.

The plan met with considerable initial confusion from enterprise managers who, throughout their careers, had underestimated their potential output in order to later exceed their quota. Also difficult was the requirement to comply with the new directives before all aspects of the economy (i.e., prices, resource availability) had shifted over. And the reluctance of certain bureaucrats to comply with the new policies was the subject of sustained criticism in the press, including multiple editorials by Liberman himself. In April 1966, for example, Liberman recommended creating a "brain trust of the reconstruction" which could veto counter-reformist policies in the bureaucracy. Officials at the higher administrative levels (i.e., the ministries), continued to issue orders at odds with the profitability plans of the enterprise managers. Some traditional problems—such as accumulation (which undercut profitability) of surplus valuable supplies, lest they be needed later in a time of shortage—persisted. Gossnab and the ministries were blamed for failing to make the appropriate inputs available to the enterprises.

A price revision, the first since 1955, was announced in mid-1966, apparently following some non-trivial internal disputes. The revision called for moderate re-alignment of prices, to conform more with production costs, and went into effect in July 1967. Wholesale fuel and ore prices increased substantially. Prices on consumer goods did not officially increase at all; yet consumers paid higher prices for things they wanted and needed, since newer, more expensive goods were introduced to the market, and the old versions withdrawn.

== Results ==
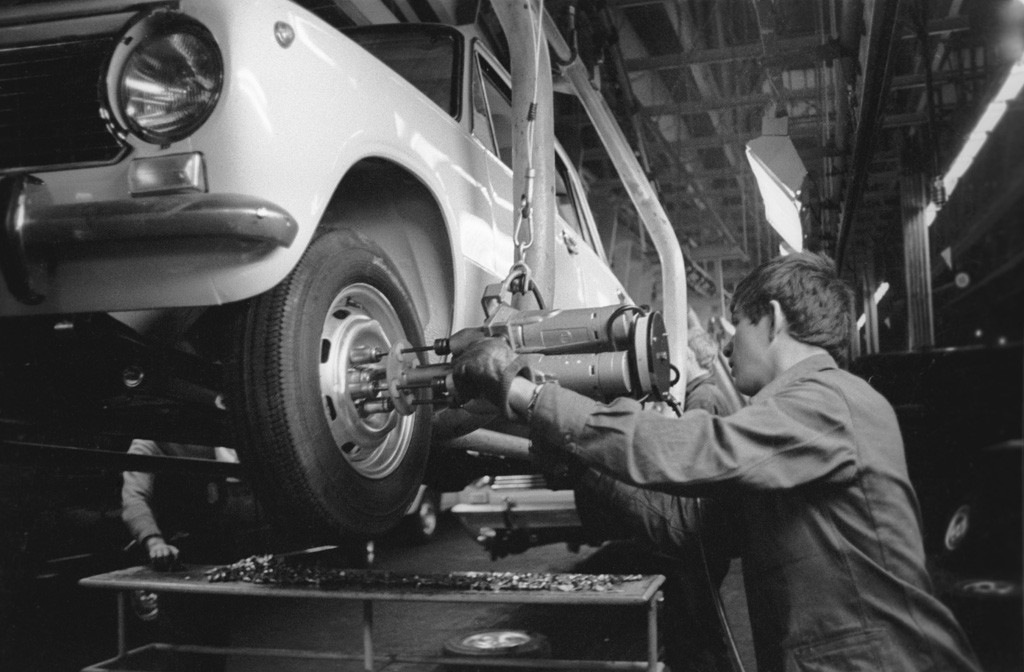
Working on a vehicle in 1969 at the new AvtoVAZ plant in Tolyatti

The economy grew more in 1966–1970 than it did in 1961–1965. Many enterprises were encouraged to sell or give away excess equipment, since all available capital was factored into the calculation of productivity. Certain measurements of efficiency improved. These included rising sales per rouble worth of capital and falling wages per rouble of sales. The enterprises rendered large portions of their profits, sometimes 80%, to the central budget. These payments of "free" remaining profits substantially exceeded capital charges.

However, central planners were not satisfied with the impact of the reform. In particular, they observed that wages had increased without a commensurate rise in productivity. Many of the specific changes were revised or reversed in 1969–1971.

The reforms somewhat reduced the role of the Party in micromanaging economic operations. The backlash against economic reformism joined with opposition to political liberalization to trigger the full-blown invasion of Czechoslovakia in 1968.

Soviet officials and press nevertheless continued to advance the idea of the 1965 reform. Kosygin commented on June 10, 1970:

The essence of the reform is, while perfecting centralized planning, to raise the initiative and interest of enterprises in the fullest use of production resources and to raise the efficiency of production in order to unify the interests of workers, enterprises, and society as a whole by means of the system of economic stimuli.

== See also ==
- 1973 Soviet economic reform
- Bibliography of the Post Stalinist Soviet Union § Economics
