= 1973 Soviet economic reform =

Attempt to partially decentralize planning in the Soviet economy

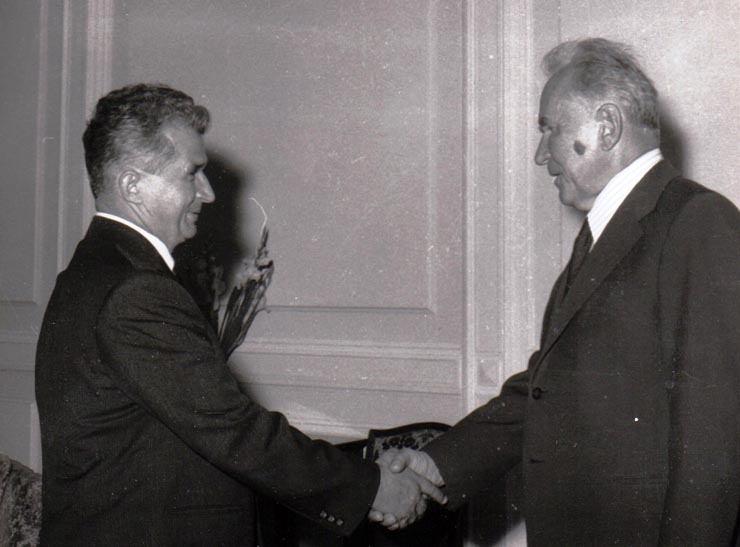
Alexei Kosygin (right) shaking hands with Romanian communist leader Nicolae Ceaușescu on 22 August 1974

The 1973 Soviet economic reform was an economic reform initiated by Alexei Kosygin, the Chairman of the Council of Ministers. During Leonid Brezhnev's rule of the Union of Soviet Socialist Republics (USSR), the Soviet economy began to stagnate; this period is referred to by some historians as the Era of Stagnation. After the failed 1965 reform Kosygin initiated another reform in 1973 to enhance the powers and functions of the regional planners by establishing associations. The reform was never fully implemented, and members of the Soviet leadership complained that the reform had not even been fully implemented by the time of the 1979 reform.

== Intentions ==
The reform was ratified in April 1973. Alexei Kosygin's intention with the reform was to indirectly weaken the powers and functions of the central Ministries by establishing associations at the republican and local level of government. The newly established associations were to increase co-operation between enterprises on such important matters as technology, innovation, and education. Each association was to be specialised. A typical inefficiency with Soviet planning was that each enterprise was burdened by excessive production.

== Implementation ==
Implementation of the reform was slow. New associations and agencies were still being established in 1980s, a decade after the reform was initiated. High-standing Soviet officials commented on the problem when the 1979 reform was initiated. Local planners and economists in the 1980s still complained that they had too little power in the daily running of their local economies. Specialised literature proved that the reform's main goal had failed to meet the expected standards.

If the reform had been fully implemented it would have given republican and local-level associations considerable more leeway in economic management. The central ministries lost influence via the abolition of the glavki, high-standing departments housing skilled administrators and planners, and the level below the central Ministries would have been strengthened; the merger of enterprises into associations would have given them a common spokesman with economic expertise. The reform would have increased the influence of the political leadership and the State Planning Committee (Gosplan). Historian Jan Åke Dellenbrant notes that an "unofficial reason" for the reform was to intentionally weaken the central Ministries, which had been accused of halting economic progress.

The merging of enterprises into associations was accomplished by a highly controversial campaign by Soviet standards. The campaign was carried out in a spirit of derationalisation, which aggravated and even hurt the plan's highly rational goals. The industrial structure of the economy became even more derationalised and therefore more complicated. Central Ministries objected to the loss of enterprises by the setting up of associations, and enterprise managers disliked giving up most of their authority to association chairmen. Local party officials were skeptical of turning plants into local subsidiaries, because the plants' output would not be included in the republics' or regional yearly output statistics. Another problem was that local party cells claimed that they were informed too late about the reform's implementation.

=== Failure ===
The reform had the side effect of weakening the powers of regional planners over industrial policy even further. By 1981, roughly half of Soviet industry had been merged into associations with an average of four member enterprises in each association. A problem was that an association usually had its members spread over different raions, oblasts, and even republics, which aggravated the State Planning Committee's localisation planning.

The newly established associations made the Soviet economic system even more complex. Many associations increased production amongst member enterprises, such as the Gor'kii automobile plant in Leningrad, which was used as a "model example" by the Central Committee of the Communist Party of the Soviet Union (CPSU) to demonstrate a good association and a unified Primary Party Organisation (PPO). The Gor'kii plant did not share the same problems as some other associations, as all its members were located in the same city. The relations between an association and the PPO were much more strained if the association had members over a wide geographic area.

The reform had the effect of disrupting the CPSU's traditional allocation of resources between territorial and industrial agencies. Kommunist, a Soviet newspaper, noted that PPOs that supervised associations with members over a wide geographic area tended to lose touch with the local party and factory organisations, which prevented them from working effectively.

== See also ==
- 1965 Soviet economic reform
- 1979 Soviet economic reform
- Bibliography of the Post Stalinist Soviet Union § Economics
