= Wage reform in the Soviet Union, 1956–1962 =

Economic reform movement

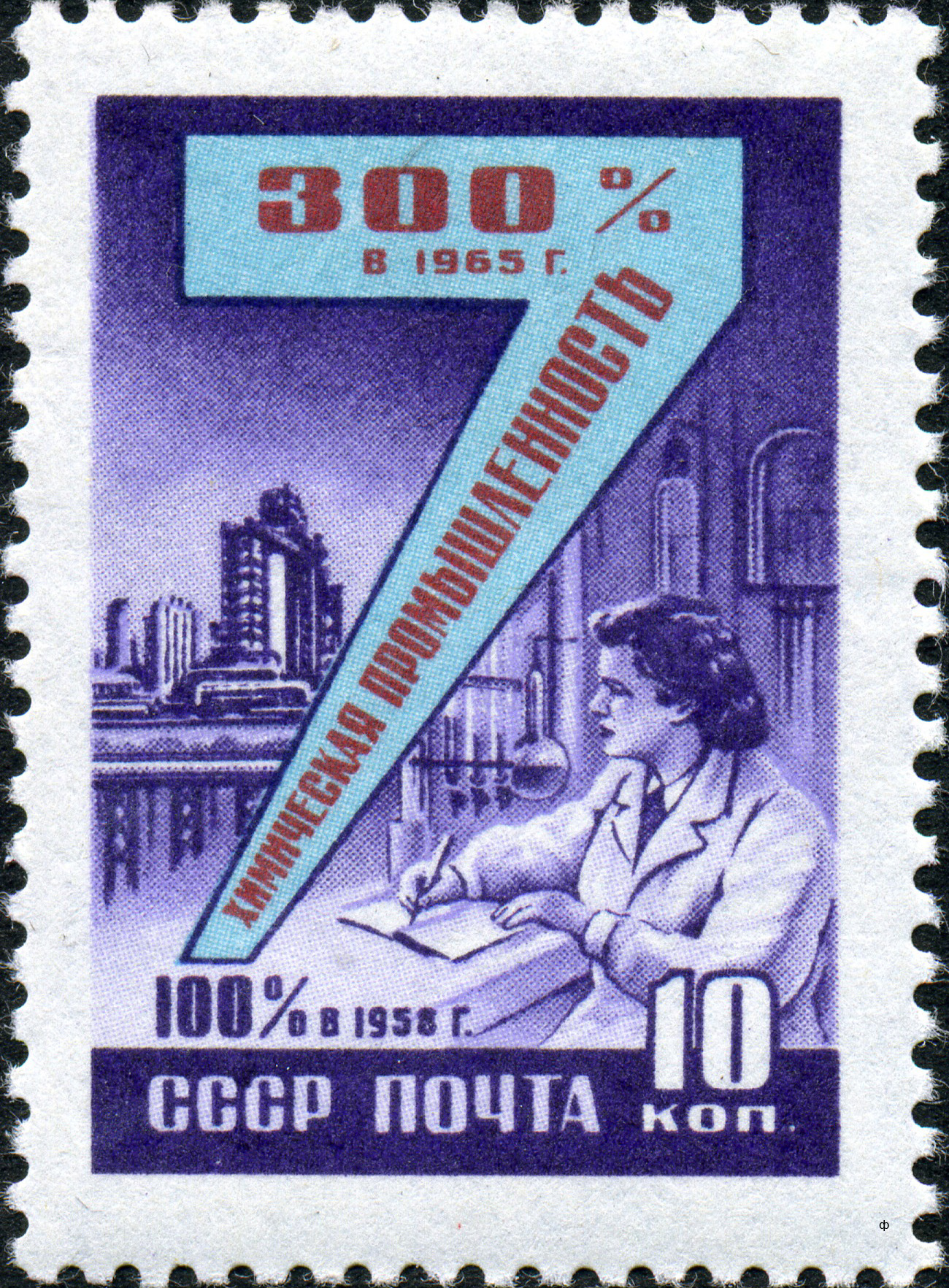
A Soviet postage stamp from 1959. The stamp celebrates growth in the chemical industry.

During the Khrushchev era, especially from 1956 through 1962, the Soviet Union attempted to implement major wage reforms intended to move Soviet industrial workers away from the mindset of overfulfilling quotas that had characterised the Soviet economy during the preceding, ideologically-stricter, Marxist-Leninist period and toward a financial incentive that primarily reflected liberal, capitalist-oriented economic principles. This shift in political trajectory was understood by international Marxist-Leninists as a development in the emergence of modern revisionism: the socialist nation's elopement from traditional, Marxist-Leninist principles.

Throughout the Stalinist period, most Soviet workers had been paid for their work based on a piece-rate system. Thus their individual wages were directly tied to the amount of work they produced. This policy was intended to encourage workers to toil and therefore increase production as much as possible. The piece-rate system led to the growth of bureaucracy and contributed to significant inefficiencies in Soviet industry. In addition, factory managers frequently manipulated the personal production quotas given to workers to prevent workers' wages from falling too low.

The wage reforms sought to remove these wage practices and offer an efficient financial incentive to Soviet workers by standardising wages and reducing the dependence on overtime or bonus payments. However, industrial managers were often unwilling to take actions that would effectively reduce workers' wages and frequently ignored the directives they were given, continuing to pay workers high overtime rates. Industrial materials were frequently in short supply, and production needed to be carried out as quickly as possible once materials were available—a practice known as "storming". The prevalence of storming meant that the ability to offer bonus payments was vital to the everyday operation of Soviet industry, and as a result the reforms ultimately failed to create a more efficient system.

== Background ==
=== Existing system ===
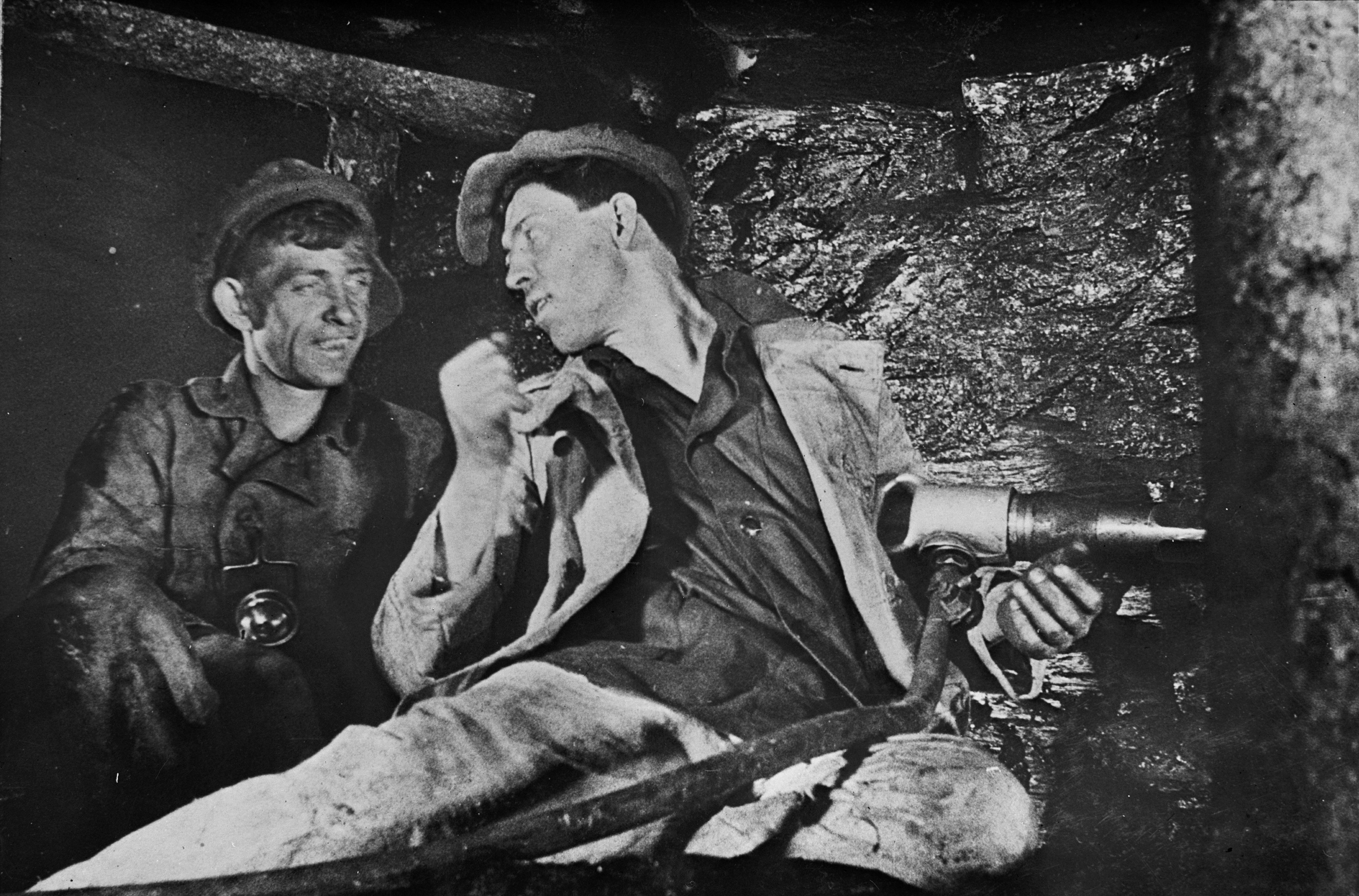
Aleksei Grigorievich Stakhanov (right), a coal miner who famously cut 14 times his daily quota of coal in one shift, was presented as a role model for workers by Soviet authorities.

During the period of Stalinism, the Soviet Union attempted to achieve economic growth through increased industrial production. In 1927–1928, the sum total of Soviet production of capital goods amounted to 6 billion roubles, but by 1932, annual production increased to 23.1 billion roubles. Factories and industrial enterprises were actively encouraged to "achieve at whatever cost", with a strong emphasis placed on overfulfilling stated targets so as to produce as much as possible. For example, the slogan for the first Five-Year Plan, "The Five-Year Plan In Four Years!", called on workers to fulfill the state's objectives a year earlier than planned.

Frantically rushed production was very common in Soviet industry, and in particular a process known as "storming" (Russian: штурмовщина, pronounced shturmovshchina) was endemic; it involved crash programs in which factories tried to undertake all their monthly production quota in a very short space of time. This was usually the result of a lack of industrial materials that left factories without the resources to complete production until new supplies arrived at the end of the month. Workers then worked as many hours as possible to meet monthly quotas in time; this exhausted them and left them unable to work at the beginning of the next month (although lack of raw materials meant there would have been very little for them to produce at this point anyway).

To encourage individual workers to work hard and produce as much as they possibly could, most workers in Soviet industry were paid on a piece-rate; their wage payments depended upon how much work they personally completed. Soviet workers were given individual quotas for the amount of work they should personally deliver and would earn a basic wage (stavka) by fulfilling 100 percent of their quota. The wage rate for work would grow as production over this level increased. If a worker produced 120 percent of his own personal quota for the month (for example, if he was supposed to produce 1,000 items, but actually produced 1,200) he would receive his basic wage for the first 100 percent, a higher rate for the first 10 percent of over production and an even higher rate for the next 10 percent. Soviet authorities hoped that this would encourage a Stakhanovite spirit of overfulfillment of quotas among the Soviet workforce. In 1956, approximately 75 percent of Soviet workers were paid under such a piece-rate system, so the majority of Soviet workers could significantly boost their earnings by increasing their output.

Average wage rates in the Soviet Union were published relatively rarely. Some academics in the West believed this was because the Soviet government wanted to conceal low average earnings. Alec Nove wrote in 1966 (when wage statistics were published for the first time since the Second World War) that the lack of transparency surrounding average wages was intended to prevent Soviet workers from discovering the huge disparities that existed between wages in different sectors of the Soviet economy.

=== Problems ===
The piece-rate approach to wages had been introduced in the first Five-Year Plan in 1928 and had changed very little since then. In practice the piece-rate system led to many inefficiencies in Soviet industry. One issue was the vast bureaucracy that was involved in administering wage payments. Each Soviet ministry or government department would set its own rates and wage scales for work in the factories or enterprises for which they were responsible. Within one ministry there could be great variation in pay rates for jobs requiring largely identical responsibilities and skills, based on what the factory was producing, the location of the factory and other factors that Moscow considered important. Basing payments on these central directives often led to long and costly processes in the calculation of wages. Historian Donald Filtzer wrote of one 1930s machinist who in one month completed 1,424 individual pieces of work. Amongst these had been 484 differing tasks, all of which had been assigned a basic individual payment rate of between 3 and 50 kopecks each (1 rouble was made up of 100 kopecks). To calculate this worker's wage, his employer had to process 2,885 documents which had required some 8,500 signatures on 8 kilograms (18 lb) of paper, costing the factory 309 roubles, a fifth of what they would pay the worker, whose total earnings for the labour amounted to 1,389 roubles.

Time workers—workers who were paid for the time they spent working rather than by how much they individually produced—also received bonuses based on performance. Factory managers, who did not want these workers to lose out to their piece-rate colleagues, often manipulated output figures to ensure that they would (on paper) overfulfill their targets and therefore receive their bonuses. Typically, managers were loath to see their employees' wages fall too low, so they frequently kept quotas deliberately low, or offered ways for workers to manipulate their work outputs to achieve a higher bonus. They generally did this to ensure that their factory could run smoothly, rather than out of concern for the workers' personal welfare. The erratic and seemingly arbitrary way that quotas had been set across different industries led to a high level of uncompleted production in industries where it was more difficult to overfulfill production quotas. Managers therefore tried to keep quotas deliberately low to attract workers to their factories to ensure their factories were able to meet their targets.

Even without managerial manipulation, quotas were very often low and easy to overfulfill. Quotas had been lowered during the Second World War so that new workers would be able to fulfill their output expectations; in industries such as engineering, it was common for workers to double their basic pay through bonuses.

== Reform ==
After the death of Stalin, the Soviet Union went through a process of moving away from Stalinist policies known as de-Stalinization. The purpose of de-Stalinization included not only ending the use of terror and the Gulag system that had existed under Stalin, but also reforming the economic policies of the Soviet Union. In the 1950s, the Soviet economy had begun to fall behind schedule in the output of several key materials including coal, iron and cement, and worker productivity was not growing at the rate expected. In May 1955, Pravda (the official newspaper of the Central Committee of the Communist Party) announced that a State Committee on Labour and Wages had been formed to investigate changes to wages and a centralised system of wage adjustments. In July 1955, Soviet Premier Nikolai Bulganin spoke of the need for Soviet industry to end outdated work quotas and reform wages, so that the Soviet Union could better incentivise workers and reduce labour turnover. The subsequent sixth Five-Year Plan for 1956 to 1960 included calls for a reform of wages. The reforms had several objectives, the most important of which was to create a more consistent system of incentives for workers. It was also hoped that the reforms would help to reduce the levels of waste and misallocation of labour that were frequently found in Soviet industry.

=== Provisions ===
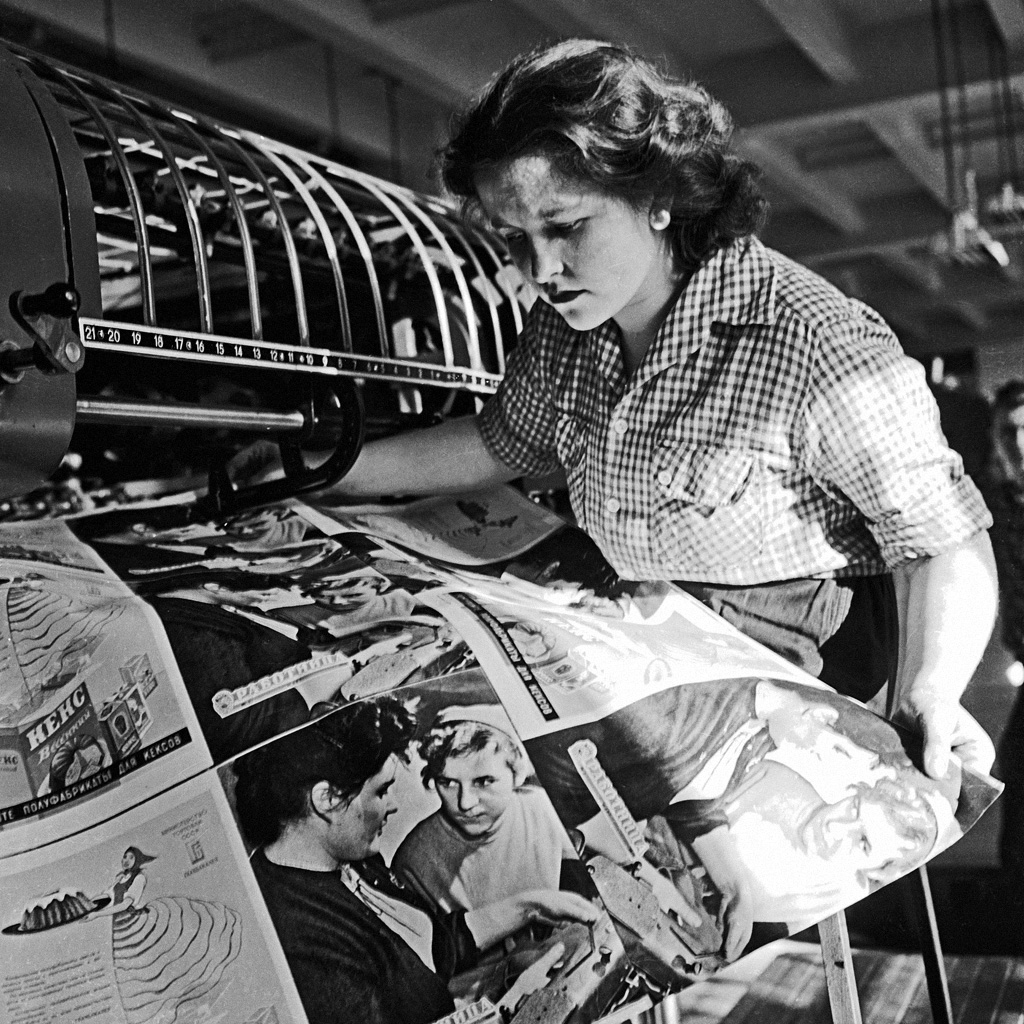
Lidiya Kulagina, a worker in the newspaper Pravda print shop (1959)

The Sixth Five Year Plan made several key changes to Soviet workers' wages. Firstly, basic wages were increased so that there would be less pressure to overfulfill quotas, and therefore less pressure to manipulate or distort results. Wage increases were restricted to the lowest paid jobs, as Soviet leader Nikita Khrushchev sought to be seen as the "friend to the underdog". It was also hoped that wage rises for lower paid jobs would encourage more women to enter industry and that freezes on higher paid jobs would deter people from leaving employment.

Secondly, quotas were raised to limit the ability of workers to overfulfill targets. In the case of time workers, this was sometimes done by keeping quotas the same but reducing hours; for example, coal miners saw their working day shortened to six hours. Some rises were very steep; in the case of engineering enterprises, quotas were raised by 65 percent.

The number of wage rates and wage scales was drastically reduced; this not only cut bureaucracy, but also ensured that workers would be more eager to take on a wider range of tasks. Time workers, for example, would be paid the same regardless of which task they carried out during their shift. This allowed managers to better distribute labour and reduce the frequency of bottlenecks occurring in production. They could do this because workers would be paid a similar rate no matter what they undertook, so it became easier to move workers between tasks.

A major change was made in the way overfulfillment was rewarded. Progressive piece-rates, where rates increased as outputs grew, were ended, and workers were paid a one-off bonus upon overachieving a quota. Where bonus rates were retained for each percentage of overfulfillment, they were capped. For example, in engineering, bonuses could not exceed 20 percent of their normal earnings.

Lastly, workers whose tasks were considered too important to be paid on a piece-rate basis were moved to a time-rate method. This was largely done in consideration of safety grounds and usually applied to those conducting maintenance or the repair of equipment.

== Successes ==
The reform's clearest effect was to reduce the proportion of Soviet industrial labour that was paid by piece-rate, and by August 1962, 60.5 percent of Soviet workers were paid by piece-rate, down from the 1956 level of 75 percent. Around half of those who remained on piece-rates would continue to receive some kind of bonus payment, but the progressive piece-rate bonuses were mostly eliminated, with only 0.5 percent of workers continuing to receive them in 1962. Workers who were taken off piece-rate payments were then paid an hourly rate or received a salary.

By 1961, workers' basic wages had risen to an average of about 73 percent of their total earnings; piece-rate workers saw an average of 71 percent and time workers 76 percent of their earnings as their basic wage. There was also a reduction in the overall level of quota overfulfillment—with quotas raised, many could not meet their own personal quota. The proportion of workers who achieved 100 percent or less of their quota varied from as low as 5.1 percent in iron and steel industries, to 31.4 percent in coal mining. Across Soviet industry, the average level of quota fulfillment fell from 169 percent before the reform, to 120 percent in October 1963.

Overall wages rose much more slowly throughout the period than planned: wages across the entire state (not only industrial wages) rose by 22.9 percent between 1959 and 1965, against a plan for growth of 26 percent. Wage rises during the reform were made up for by increases in industrial productivity. For example, in the RSFSR (Russia) wages rose by 7 percent between 1959 and 1962, whilst productivity increased by some 20 percent.

The wage reform was linked to a program that reduced the length of the overall working week in the Soviet Union, and in 1958, the working week was reduced from 48 hours to 41. This was to apply to all Soviet workers, and by 1961, 40 million Soviet workers (approximately two thirds of the workforce) were working a 41-hour week. It was planned to decrease this further to 40 hours in 1962, but this was eventually not carried out. Khrushchev had stated a longer-term aim of giving Soviet workers the shortest working hours in the world, aiming for a 30- to 35-hour week by 1968. He had spoken previously of the reduction of working hours as a basic goal of a communist movement and had hoped that communism would eventually achieve a working day of 3–4 hours.

== Failures ==
Whilst the reform did remove some of the peculiarities of the Stalinist era, the overall impact of program created additional problems for the Soviet worker. In many areas, large variations in wages continued to exist. In engineering, for example, factory managers often ignored wage directives to try to encourage workers into roles that had lost much of their attraction after basic wages were cut to match pay throughout an area. Managers would therefore offer higher wages to new trainees. This had the effect of encouraging some to take a high-paid training position and then leave for a new training position upon qualification. In coal mining, managers had long held the ability to vary wages based on local considerations, such as geological factors or hazard levels, and after the reform they continued to vary wages through manipulation of quotas or rates to protect workers' wages. A further problem with a centrally directed bonus system was that it encouraged factories to continue producing well established, more familiar products because it was far easier to overfulfill targets on familiar products than to start work on new items.

Sometimes in areas where the new wages were applied, factories would struggle to recruit workers for important tasks because the reform had given a low pay grade to a task that was considered to require a lower level of skill. For example, machine-tool operation was given a low pay grade, and at one factory in Kotlyakov some 30 machine-tools sat unused as factory managers were unable to recruit workers to operate them.

In other instances, managers deliberately used the reforms as an opportunity to cut wages, exaggerating wage cuts made by the ministries so that they would be able to cut back on overall expenditure. In one case, a manager of a concrete factory was sentenced to eight months corrective labour after being found guilty of using the reforms as a pretext to extract unpaid overtime from workers.

== Results ==
Overall, the wage reform failed to create a stable and predictable incentives system. Filtzer wrote that wider issues in Soviet industry and relations between managers and workers are important in understanding the failure. Filtzer noted a myriad of issues in Soviet production that had meant a more formal bonus system was unworkable in the Soviet Union: irregular availability of supplies that were often of variable quality, an irrational division of labour and a reliance on "storming" that made it difficult to motivate workers through a more conventional payments system. In such cases, it was vital to have the ability to offer additional overtime payments and even use bribes or "palm-greasing" to incentivise workers to meet monthly quotas on time.

Filtzer also stated that because Soviet workers were unable to organise against their superiors in the same way that their counterparts in the West could (for example by forming an independent trade union or joining a political party in opposition to the ruling Communist Party of the Soviet Union) they had undergone a process of "hyper individualisation", a process that had been heavily influenced by the overall incentive process. This had led to a situation where workers who could not count on a Western-style meritocracy (where they might expect to find their pay and conditions improve with promotions) would instead have to rely on the decisions of managers to give bonuses and overtime payments if they wanted to increase their wages. Because managers needed to be able to give rewards and bonuses at their own discretion, sticking to a centrally directed system of wages was very difficult.

In terms of labour process theory—the attempt to understand the relationship between management control, worker skill and wages in industrial workplaces—Filtzer emphasised the continuing absence of control by Soviet workers over their own labour process. The Soviet elite would not radically change the labour process by democratising it and introducing truly equal wages for everyone in society, but nor could they generate the culture of consumerism that in the West was used to help explain the wage and skill structure. In these circumstances, attempts to coordinate production quotas, wages and expected levels of worker effort failed and continued to fail into the 1980s. The wage reform of 1956–1962 was a failure, as it could neither fix nor improve the economic conflict between workers and the elite in the Soviet Union. On the shop floor, workers continued to directly bargain with low-level management over effort, wages and what "skill" they would exert. In particular, Filtzer notes that Soviet workers were constantly forced into a position of exerting more skill than was officially called for in plans or quotas. This was because Soviet workers often had to find their own ways of working around problems that made their efforts difficult, such as building their own tools to carry out tasks that could not be performed with the tools provided, or by devising entirely new production processes of their own when existing processes were not suitable. This was a condition only seen to such an extent in the West in industries that were insulated from market forces. Because this was common in Soviet industry, workers and managers in the Soviet Union had many reasons to work together in the setting of wages, quotas and skill expectations, even after the wage reform. Filtzer wrote that Mikhail Gorbachev attempted a very similar series of wage reforms in 1986 (Perestroika), which ultimately failed and had to be replaced with a decentralised system in 1991.
