= Grigorii Khanin =

Russian economist (born 1937)

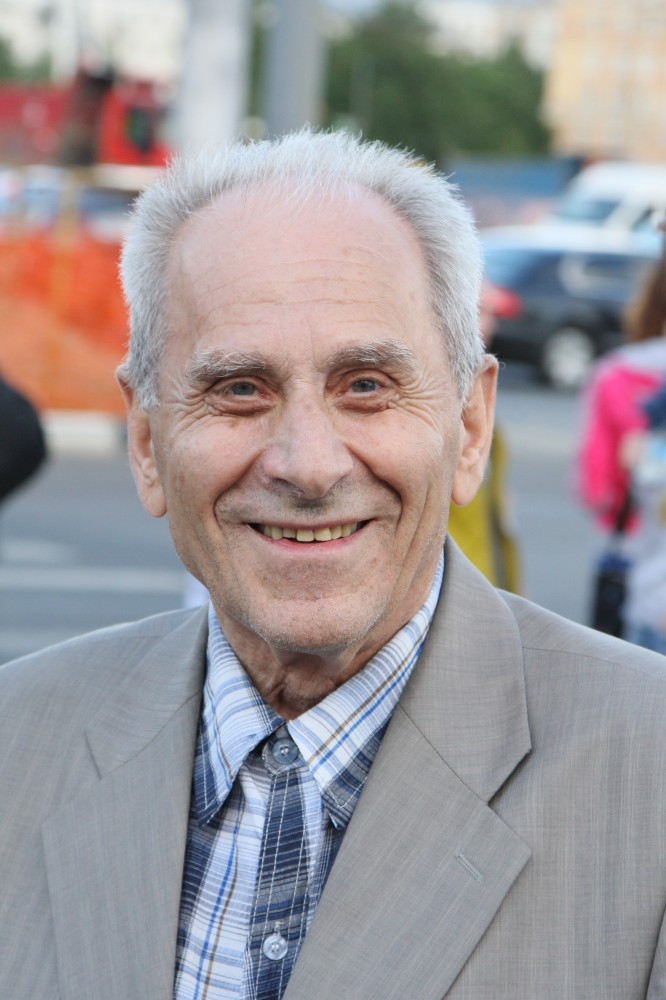
Khanin in 2015

Grigorii Isaakovich Khanin (Russian: Григорий Исаакович Ханин; born 11 June 1937) is a Russian economist (Doctor of economic sciences) best known for his 1987 recalculation of official Soviet Union's economic growth statistics. After the collapse of the Soviet Union, he began recalculating Russian economic statistics. His recalculations differed substantially from the official figures, particularly for the value of the capital stock.

His work on the economic history of the Soviet Union and Russia has always been controversial but well grounded in the available (often adjusted by him) statistics. For example, he argued that the New Economic Policy had exhausted itself and that Joseph Stalin's break with it had a serious economic logic. He also argued that Stalin was planning a liberalisation policy shortly before his death.

Khanin's recalculated statistics were estimated using a variant of the physical indicators method. They were based on the output data for a small number of sectors (e.g., electricity production and freight transport) which were used to generate estimates for mesoeconomic and macroeconomic data. These estimates were checked by using several variant values for the constituent data. Although crude and difficult to replicate, this method may well have given a better picture of the economy than the official data. He has also integrated his alternative statistics into a series of books on the economic history of the Soviet Union and Russia from the late 1930s to 1998.

A feature of his work has been the utilisation of a wide range of published sources in both Russian and English. He published a whole book critically evaluating Western estimates of Soviet economic growth and has published a very positive review of Robert William Davies's work on the economic history of the USSR in the 1930s.

== Published works ==
- Grigorii Khanin (1992). "Economic growth in the 1980s". in Michael Ellman & Vladimir Kontorovich eds, The disintegration of the Soviet economic system. London, Routledge ISBN 0-415-06349-3.
- Khanin, Gregory "An uninvited advisor", Ellman, Michael, Kontorovich, Vladimir eds (1998). The destruction of the Soviet economic system. New York, M.E.Sharpe ISBN 0-7656-0263-6 pp.76-85.
- Khanin, G. I. (2003). "The 1950s—the triumph of the Soviet economy". Europe-Asia Studies. 55 (8): 1187–1212. doi:10.1080/0966813032000141088. S2CID 154716647.
- G.I.Khanin, Dinamika ekonomicheskogo razvitiia SSSR (Novosibirsk 1991).
- G.I.Khanin, Sovetskii ekonomicheskii rost: analiz zapadnykh otsenok (Novsibirsk 1993).
- G. I. Khanin, Ekonomicheskaya istoriya Rossii v noveishee vremya vol 1 Ekonomika SSSR v kontse 30-x - 1960 god (Novosibirsk 2003)
- G. I. Khanin, Ekonomicheskaya istoriya Rossii v noveishee vremya, vol 1 (Novosibirsk 2008), vol 2 (Novosibirsk 2010).
- G. I. Khanin. Ekonomicheskaya istoriya Rossii v noveishee vremya. Rossiiskaya ekonomika v 1992–1998 gody (Novosibirsk 2014).
- G. I. Khanin, Ekonomika i obshchestvo Rossii: retrospektiva i perspektiva vol.1 (Novosibirsk 2015).

== See also ==
- Economy of Russia
- Economy of the Soviet Union
- Era of Stagnation
