= 1979 Soviet economic reform =

Attempts to boost the Soviet economy

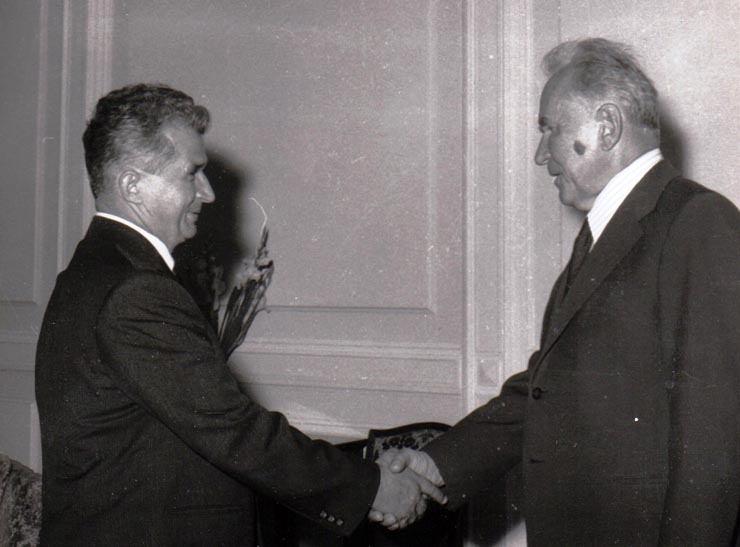
Alexei Kosygin (right) shaking hands with Romanian communist leader Nicolae Ceaușescu on 22 August 1974

The 1979 Soviet economic reform, or "Improving planning and reinforcing the effects of the economic mechanism on raising the effectiveness in production and improving the quality of work", was an economic reform initiated by Alexei Kosygin, the Chairman of the Council of Ministers. During Leonid Brezhnev's rule of the Union of Soviet Socialist Republics (USSR) the Soviet economy began to stagnate; this period is referred to by historians as the Era of Stagnation. Even after several reform attempts by Kosygin and his protégés, the economic situation in the country continued to deteriorate. In contrast to his earlier reform initiative, the 26th Congress decided that his government would implement the reform during the Eleventh five-year plan from 1981 to 1985. This never happened, and even Brezhnev complained that implementation of the reform had been slow. This unfinished reform is seen by some as the last major pre-perestroika reform initiative put forward by the Soviet government.

== Intentions ==
The reform was initiated, and created, by Premier Alexei Kosygin in a joint decision with the Central Committee (CC) and the Council of Ministers. The reform tried to reaffirm and separate the economic functions of the state and the ministries. To accomplish this, several procedures were established to ensure that each ministry would contribute to the state budget. All ministries were given a fixed budget even if the ministry did not fulfill the five-year plan. The reform supported giving enterprises more autonomy from the central government and extending the rights of the ministries by giving them new principles. The reform tried to improve labor productivity by introducing new production indicators via the State Standards Committee, and tried to solve some of the USSR's economic problems by reducing the effects of sectorial barriers set up by the ministries. The reform succeeded in giving more power to the regional authorities and the Soviet Republics; this development was consolidated by a Central Committee decree in 1981.

== Implementation ==
The 1979 reform was an attempt to reform the existing economic system without any radical changes. The economic system was centralised even more than previously. The effectiveness of the command economy was improved in some sectors, but not enough to save the USSR from economic stagnation. One of the major goals of the reform was to improve the distribution of resources and investment, which had long been neglected because of "sectorialism" and "regionalism". Another priority was the elimination of the influence "regionalism" had on the five-year plan.

The 1965 reform tried, with little success, to improve the quality of goods produced. In the 1979 reform Kosygin tried to displace gross output from "its commanding place" in the administrative command economy, and new regulations for rare and high-quality goods were created. Capital investment was seen as a very serious problem by the Soviet authorities by 1979, with General Secretary Leonid Brezhnev and Premier Kosygin claiming that only an increase in labor productivity could help develop the economy of the more technologically advanced Soviet Republics such as the Estonian Soviet Socialist Republic (ESSR). When Kosygin died in 1980, the reform was practically abandoned by his successor, Nikolai Tikhonov. Brezhnev told the 26th Congress that the implementation of the reform had been very slow. Tikhonov, during his speech to the 26th Congress, told the delegates that parts of the reform would be implemented during the Eleventh Five-Year Plan (1981–1985).

== See also ==
- 1965 Soviet economic reform
- 1973 Soviet economic reform
- Bibliography of the Post Stalinist Soviet Union § Economics
