= Soviet working class =

Element of Marxist–Leninist theory

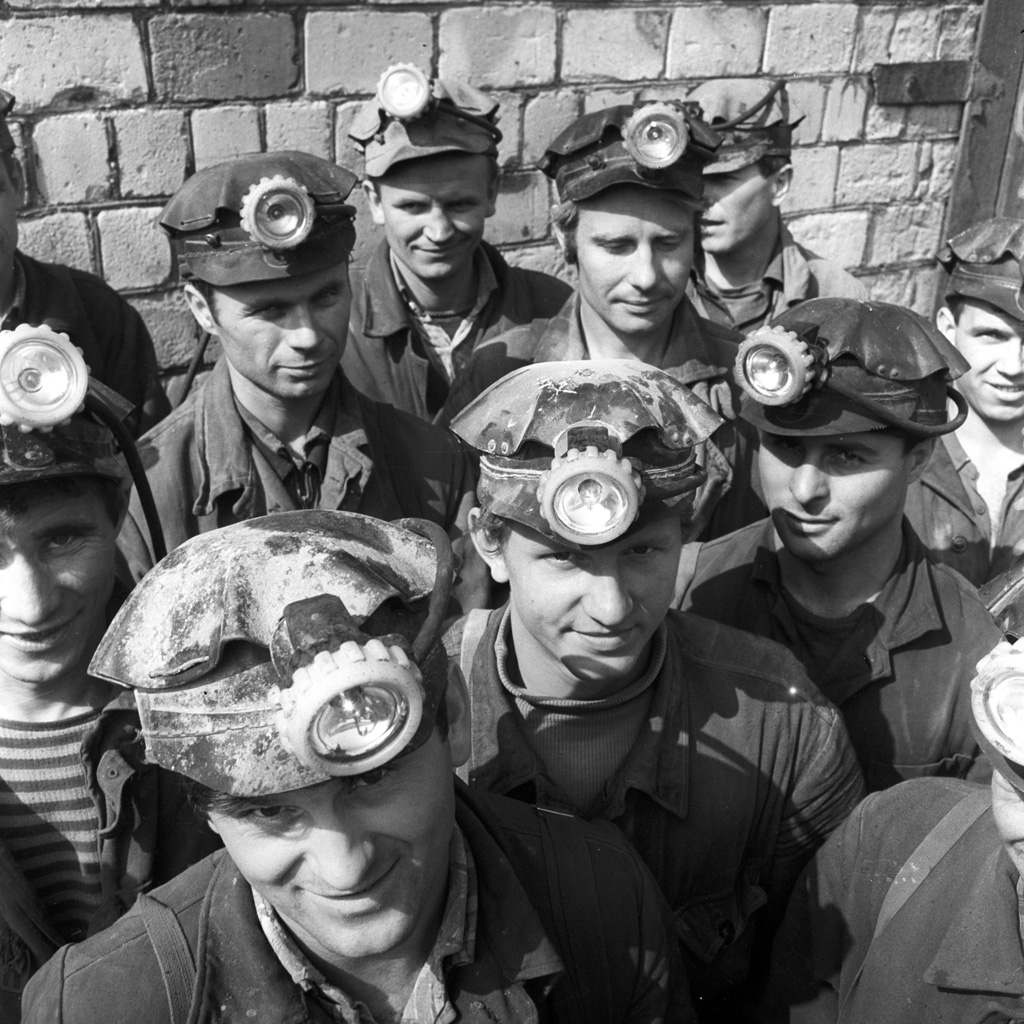
Workers of the Soligorsk potash plant, 1968

According to Marxist–Leninist theory, the Soviet working class was supposed to be the Soviet Union's ruling class during its transition from the socialist stage of development to full communism. According to Andy Blunden, its influence over production and policies diminished as the Soviet Union's existence progressed.

== Employment ==
=== Productivity ===
Several Soviet economists expressed concern over the focus of sharp growth in per capita income over that of labor productivity. A problem was that wages in the Soviet Union could neither be used as a way of disciplining workers or as an incentive system, except in a limited capacity. Soviet workers were not controlled by the stick and carrot (the carrot being increased wages and the stick being unemployment).

=== Women ===
Women employment (1922–1976)
Year	Number (in millions)	% of workforce
1922	1.560	25
1926	2.265	23
1928	2.795	24
1932	6.000	27.4
1940	13.190	39
1945	15.920	54
1950	19.180	47
1955	23.040	46
1960	29.250	47
1965	37.680	49
1968	42.680	50
1970	45.800	51
1972	48.707	51
1974	51.297	51
1976	53.700	51.5

The early Soviet government ensued a policy of pushing more women into urban industrial employment; these policies were ideologically, politically and/or economically driven. The post-revolutionary turmoils hampered any improvements for immediate prospects of increased employment of women in urban areas. The 13th Party Congress, held in 1924, took employment of women very seriously, and were alarmed with the developments in the country; employment of women had decreased from 25 percent to 23 percent of the total workforce. By 1928, the proportion of women working in the workforce had increased to 24 percent. During Joseph Stalin's rule the number of women working increased from 24 percent of the workforce in 1928 to 39 percent in 1940. In the period 1940–1950 women were 92 percent of new entrants in employment; this is mostly due to the exodus of the men who fought during World War II. The return of men to civilian life decreased female employment. In 1945, 56 percent of the workforce was made up of women, this number decreased to 47 percent in 1950.

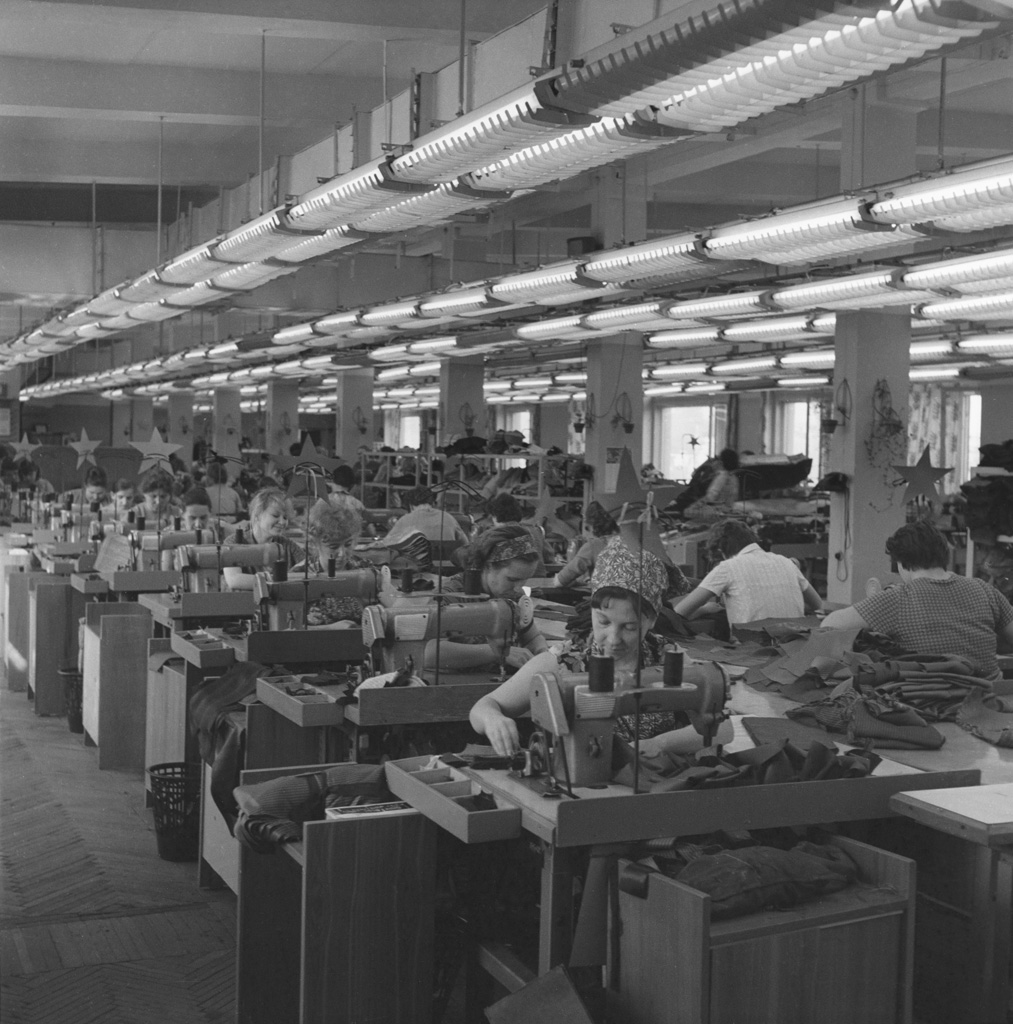
Suits for men are manufactured at the Bolshevichka garment factory by women

In the 1960s, the Soviet Union underwent their last major campaign to increase female employment due to labor shortages across the country. A 1959 census stated that out of the 13 million able-strong people who could work, but didn't, 89 percent of them were women. Many of these women lived in small urban areas with low, or bad child-care facilities. In the period 1960–1971, 18 million new women were employed, the majority of them came from households. This source of labor was exhausted nationwide, except within the Soviet Muslim populations. Employing women was a major problem in Soviet Central Asia, the majority of women working the Central Asian republics were of Russian or Ukrainian ethnicity. For example, in 1973, 54 percent of the population of Turkmenistan were employed, of these, less than one-third of them were ethnic Turkmen.

Similar to capitalism, the patriarchy and the role of women played an important part in Soviet development. Before Stalin consolidated his power, the government initiated a policy which ended discrimination against women in the workplace. However, Stalin's government was more conservative, and overturned several Bolshevik legislations. While not opposing that women should work, women were given low-level jobs and were, in the workplace, on the bottom of the social ladder. Women were given the lowest-paid jobs and low-skilled jobs. Another problem was that while women were proletarianized, their family burdens increased – women were still expected to continue their traditional duties at home and in the family.

Despite discrimination, several advances were made. For instance, in 1926, 9 out of every 10 working women worked in agriculture, in 1959 this had decreased to half of working women and in 1975 under a third of women worked in agriculture. A major reason for the increasing role which women held in the workforce was due to the fact that, by 1960, there were more women than men in the Soviet Union. Another reason for the increasing role of women was that average wages were too small; women needed to work if the picture of the average Soviet family would become reality.

== Standard of living ==
=== Working conditions ===
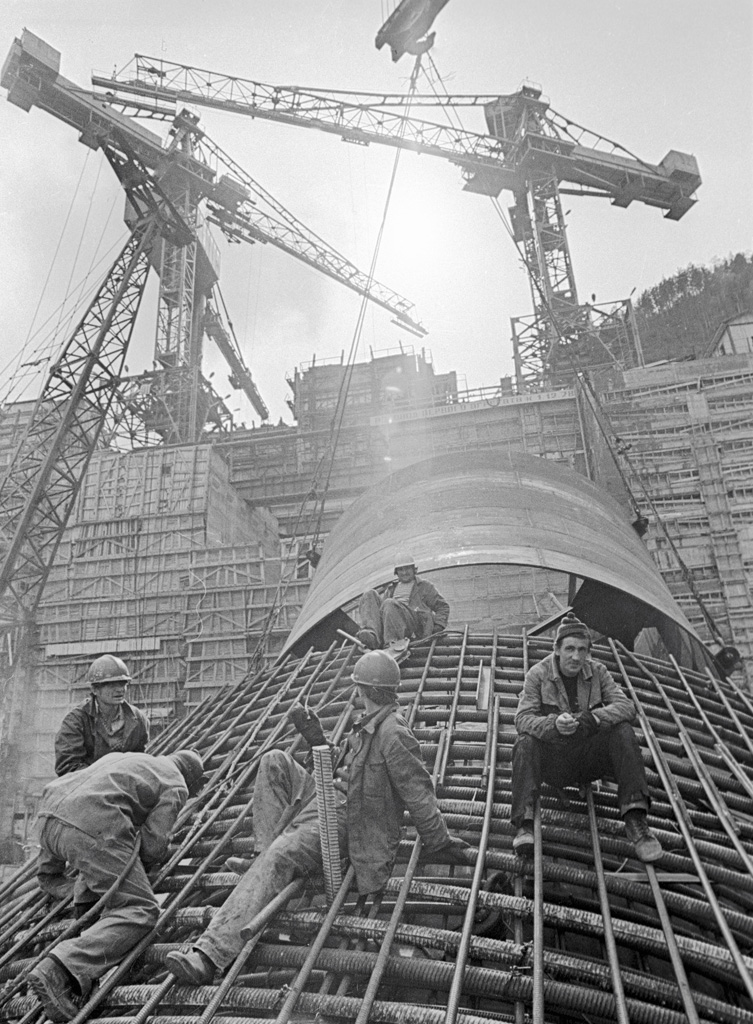
Workers on the construction of the Sayano-Shushenskaya Hydropower Plant, 1978

Working conditions for a Soviet worker changed over time; for instance, at the beginning of the socialist regime the government pursued a policy of worker participation at the enterprise level. During Joseph Stalin's crash-industrialisation drive, workers lost their right to participate in the functioning of the enterprise, and their working conditions deteriorated. In 1940, for example, a decree was promulgated and became law stating that a worker could be arrested if he had three accumulated absences, late arrivals or changed jobs without the official authorisation. Shock work, which meant that workers had to work past regular hours, was introduced alongside central planning. During World War II the pressure on workers increased and it was expected of them to take on Herculean efforts in their work. In the post-war years conditions did not improve but in fact worsened in some cases. For instance, small theft became illegal; this had been allowed for several years to compensate for workers' low salaries. The situation for the common worker improved during the post-Stalin years, and some of the worst measures approved by the Stalin regime to improve worker productivity were repealed. Because of the lack of a stick and carrot policy under the Brezhnev administration, worker productivity and discipline decreased during the 1970s.

=== Wages ===
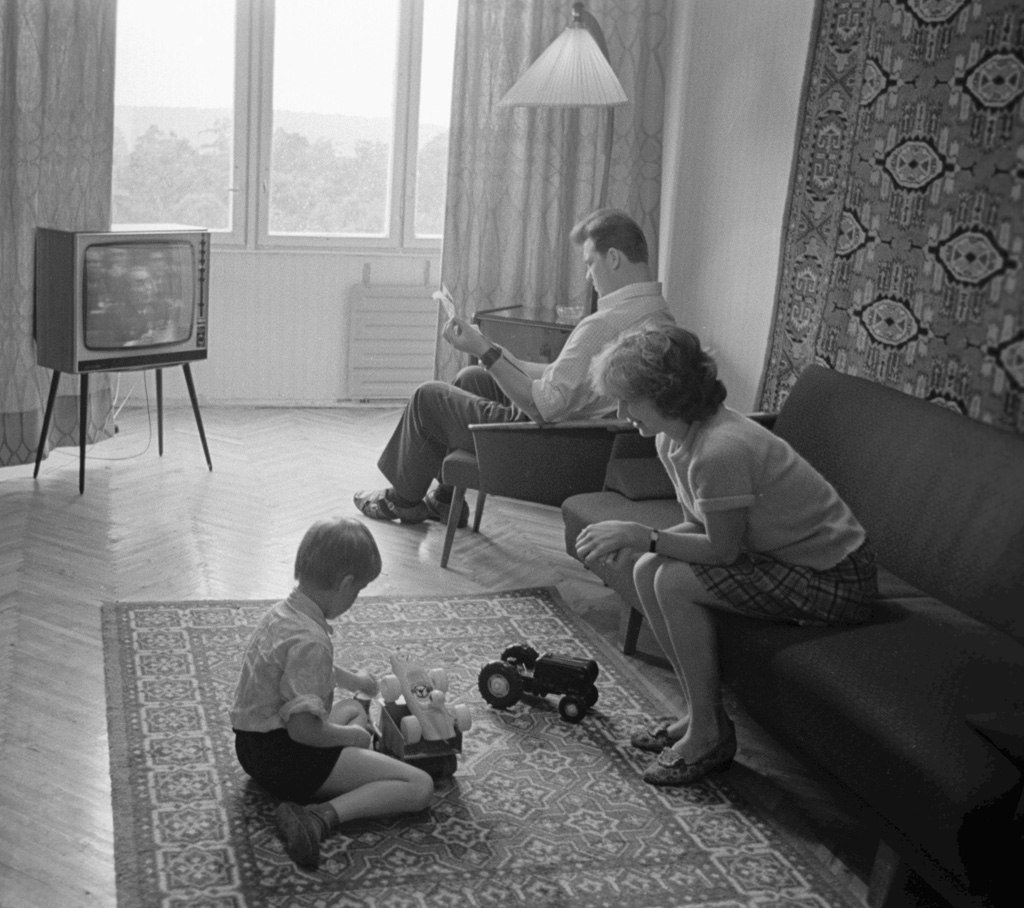
An "average" Soviet working-class family in 1976, according to RIA Novosti; this family lived in Kiev

Since unemployment was rendered unviable through various acts of legislation, the Soviet worker, in contrast to a worker in a capitalist society, was more secure economically. In return for working, a Soviet worker would get an individual return in the form of a money wage; however, during the period under the New Economic Policy (1920s), hyperinflation rendered money effectively useless, and wages sometimes occurred through bartering. Money wage in Soviet parlance was not the same as in Capitalist countries. The money wage was set at the top of the administrative system, and it was the same administrative system which also set bonuses. Wages were 80 percent of the average Soviet worker's income, with the remaining 20 percent coming in the form of bonuses. The Soviet wage system tried systematically to make wages more equal; for instance, the relationship between wages was termed "ITRs", a measure of comparing wages across occupations. For engineers and other technical workers ITR was 1.68 in 1955, but had decreased to 1.21 in 1977. Social wages were also an important part of the general standard of living for an average household; it stood at 23.4 percent of income for the average Soviet worker and their family, and at 19.1 percent for the family income of collective farmers. In the period between 1971 and 1981, the social wage grew faster than the money wage; the money wage grew by 45 percent for workers and employees and 72 for workers at collective farms. In contrast, per capita income from social wages increased by 81 percent. Social wage took many forms; it could be improved health, education, transport or food subsidies, which was the responsibility of the state, or the improvement (or introduction) of sanitation and working facilities.

=== Social benefits ===
The access to use values by the common Soviet worker was not determined by money wages, but rather by a position in the official hierarchy, access to privilege or the privileged, access to foreign currency, where a person lived, influence and access to the black market. In contrast to capitalist societies, money was not the cornerstone of life – a Soviet person would not come into contact with more use-values by the amount of money he or she had.
