= Archie Brown (historian) =

British political scientist (born 1938)

Archibald Haworth Brown, CMG, FBA (born 10 May 1938, Annan) is a British political scientist. In 2005, he became an emeritus professor of politics at the University of Oxford and an emeritus fellow of St Antony's College, Oxford, where he served as a professor of politics and director of St Antony's Russian and East European Centre. He has written widely on Soviet and Russian politics, on communist politics more generally, on the Cold War, and on political leadership.

== Career ==
Brown taught at the University of Glasgow from 1964 to 1971, during which time he was a British Council exchange scholar at Moscow State University for the academic year 1967–68.

In 1998, he was a Distinguished Visiting Fellow of the Helen Kellogg Institute for International Studies at the University of Notre Dame in Indiana. He was Director of Graduate Studies in Politics for Oxford University between 2001 and 2003.

The Human Factor: Gorbachev, Reagan, and Thatcher, and the End of the Cold War was published in 2020. It was awarded the Pushkin House Book Prize 2021. The Human Factor was described by the chair of the panel of judges Dr Fiona Hill, former Senior Director for Russian and European Affairs in the US National Security Council, as representing "the very best in western scholarship on Russia and comparative politics" and containing "a lifetime’s achievement of wisdom and insight".

== Honours ==
He was appointed as a Companion of the Order of St Michael and St George (CMG) in the Queen's Birthday Honours list in 2005 "for services to UK-Russian relations and to the study of political science and international affairs".

== Bibliography ==
- Brown, A., Soviet Politics and Political Science, 1974 (Macmillan), ISBN 0-333-13751-5
- Brown, A., Kaser, M. (eds), The Soviet Union Since the Fall of Khrushchev, 1975, 2nd ed., 1978 (Macmillan), ISBN 0-333-23337-9
- Brown, A., Gray, J. (eds), Political Culture and Political Change in Communist States, 1977 (Macmillan), ISBN 0-333-21429-3
- Rigby, T.H., Brown, A. and Reddaway, P. (eds), Authority, Power and Policy in the USSR, 1980 (Macmillan), ISBN 0-333-21429-3
- Brown, A., Kaser, M. (eds), Soviet Policy for the 1980s, 1982 (Macmillan), ISBN 0-333-33140-0
- Brown, A., Fennell, J., Kaser, M., Willetts, H.T. (eds), The Cambridge Encyclopedia of Russia and the Soviet Union, 1982 (Cambridge University Press), ISBN 0-521-23169-8
- Brown, A., Political Culture and Communist Studies (ed), 1984 (Macmillan), ISBN 0-87332-310-6
- Brown, A., Political Leadership in the Soviet Union (ed), 1989 (Macmillan), ISBN 0-253-31214-0
- Brown, A., Biographical Dictionary of the Soviet Union (ed), 1990 (Weidenfeld & Nicolson), ISBN 0-297-82010-9
- Brown, A. (ed), New Thinking in Soviet Politics, 1992 (Macmillan), ISBN 0-333-53440-9
- Brown, A., Kaser, M., Smith, G.S. (eds), The Cambridge Encyclopedia of Russia and the Former Soviet Union, 1994 (Cambridge University Press), ISBN 0-521-35593-1
- Brown, A., The Gorbachev Factor, 1996 (Oxford University Press), ISBN 0-19-827344-4
- Barry, B., Brown, A., Hayward, J. (eds), The British Study of Politics in the Twentieth Century, 1999; paperback 2003 (Oxford University Press), ISBN 0-19-726294-5
- Brown, A. (ed.), Contemporary Russian Politics: A Reader, 2001 (Oxford University Press), ISBN 0-19-829999-0
- Brown, A., Shevtsova, L. (eds), Gorbachev, Yeltsin, and Putin: Political Leadership in Russia's Transition, 2001 (Carnegie Endowment for International Peace), ISBN 0-87003-186-4
- Brown, A. (ed), The Demise of Marxism-Leninism in Russia, 2004 (Palgrave Macmillan), ISBN 0-333-65124-3
- Brown, A., Seven Years that Changed the World: Perestroika in Perspective, 2007 (Oxford University Press), ISBN 978-0-19-956245-9
- Brown, A., The Rise and Fall of Communism, 2009 (Ecco Press, HarperCollins; and Bodley Head, Random House), ISBN 978-0-06-113879-9
- Brown, A., The Myth of the Strong Leader: Political Leadership in the Modern Age, 2014 (Bodley Head, Random House; and Basic Books), ISBN 978-1-84-7921758
- Brown, A., The Human Factor: Gorbachev, Reagan, and Thatcher, and the End of the Cold War, 2020 (Oxford University Press), ISBN 978-0-19-874870-0

=== Books in honour of Archie Brown ===
- 'Archie Brown' in Pravda, A. (ed.), Leading Russia. Putin in Perspective: Essays in Honour of Archie Brown, 2005 (Oxford University Press), ISBN 0-19-927614-5
- Stephen Whitefield (ed.), Political Culture and Post-Communism, 2005 (Palgrave Macmillan), ISBN 1-4039-4520-9
- Julie Newton and William Tompson (eds), Institutions, Ideas and Leadership in Russian Politics, 2010 (Palgrave Macmillan), ISBN 978-0-230-55147-3
