= Bolshevichka =

Clothing Factory

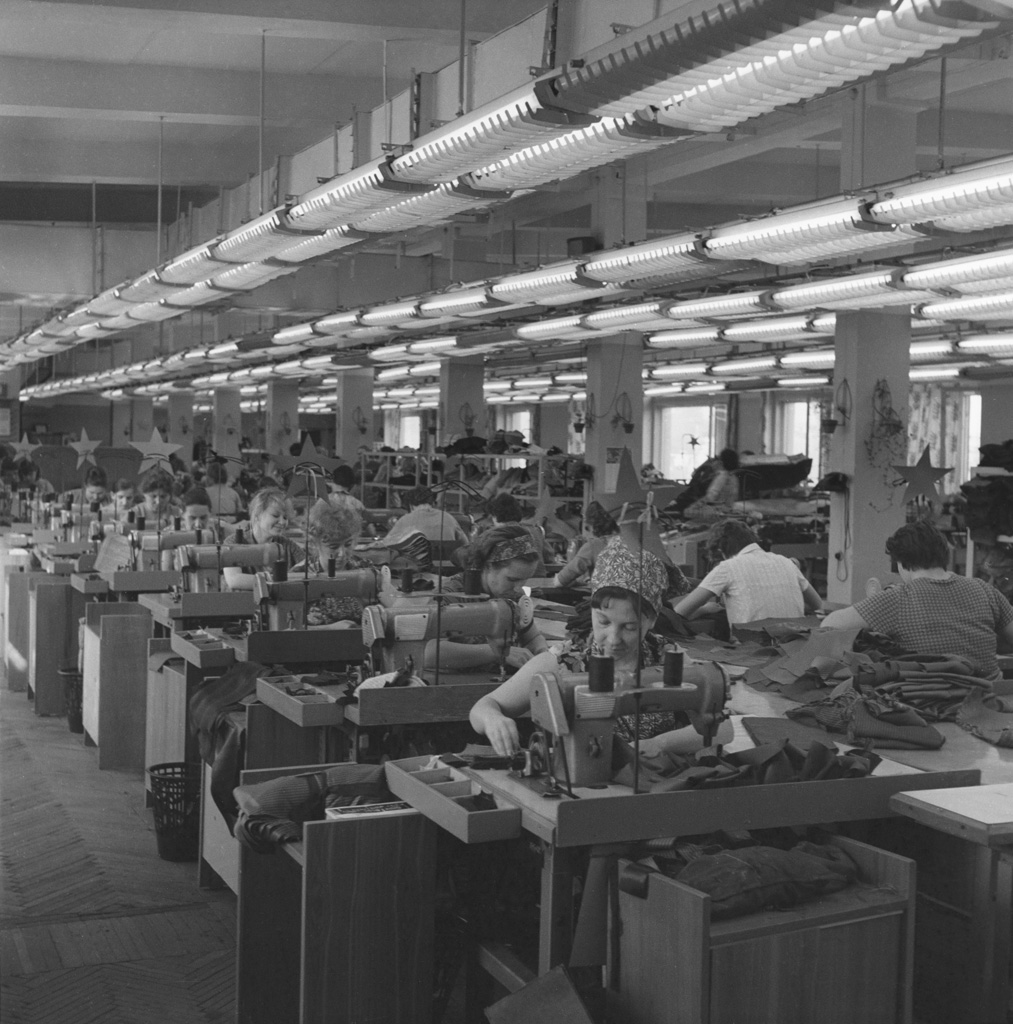
Suits for men are manufactured at the Bolshevichka garment factory (1967)

Bolshevichka or Bolshevitchka (Russian: Большевичка, literally: "female Bolshevik") is a clothes factory in Moscow. It was launched on November 16, 1929. The current official name of the enterprise is "Moscow Public Company 'Bolshevichka'" (Московское Открытое Акционерное Общество "БОЛЬШЕВИЧКА", or МОАО "Большевичка"). In 1966, it was awarded the Order of the Red Banner of Labour.

Bolshevichka was one of the largest manufacturers of menswear in the Soviet Union.

== Directors ==
- Vladimir Isaakovich Datner
- Vladimir Eduardovich Gurov
