= Robert V. Daniels =

American historian

Robert Vincent "Bill" Daniels (1926–2010) was an American historian and educator specializing in the history of the Soviet Union. He is best remembered as the author of two seminal monographs on the history of Soviet Russia —The Conscience of the Revolution (1960) and Red October (1967) — and as author or editor of an array of widely used Russian history textbooks which helped to shape the thinking of two generations of American college students.

== Biography ==
=== Early years ===
Daniels, known to his friends and acquaintances by the nickname "Bill", was born on January 4, 1926, in Boston, Massachusetts. He was the son of Robert W. Daniels, a career officer in the United States Army, and Helen Hoyt Daniels. The Daniels family moved extensively throughout Bill's childhood, but he generally returned each summer to Burlington, Vermont, the town from whence his parents hailed and where his grandparents remained.

Daniels graduated from St. Albans School in Washington, DC in 1943. The next year he joined the United States Navy, where he went through the V-12 Navy College Training Program before being assigned as paymaster on the USS Albany.

In 1945, Daniels married Alice Wendell. The couple remained together for over six decades, raising two daughters and two sons.

Daniels received his A.B. in economics in 1946, graduating magna cum laude. He later received his M.A., and Ph.D. in history from Harvard University, one of the pioneer academic programs in the field of Russian area studies. Daniels' dissertation on the Left Opposition of Leon Trotsky and Grigory Zinoviev in the Russian Communist Party up to the year 1924, was directed by historians Michael Karpovich and Merle Fainsod. Daniels' dissertation was subsequently revised and expanded for publication as The Conscience of the Revolution in 1960.

=== Academic career ===
Daniels' first academic position was at Bennington College. From there he moved to the Indiana University in Bloomington, where he remained until coming home to the University of Vermont (UVM) in 1956. Daniels remained at UVM as a professor of history until his retirement in 1988.

Daniels was the first director of the Area and International Studies program at the University of Vermont, serving in that capacity from 1962 to 1965. From 1964 to 1969 he was the chair of the History Department at UVM. He was also the director of the Experimental Program of the College of Arts and Sciences from 1969 to 1971.

Daniels retired from the University of Vermont in 1988, assuming the title of emeritus professor.

As was the case with many historians of the Soviet period, Daniels became greatly interested in the process of development in Russia following the 1991 collapse of communism and authored several books on the topic. He also was a contributor of analysis on the changing situation in Russia to liberal magazines such as Dissent and The Nation.

In 1992, Daniels was elected president of the American Association for the Advancement of Slavic Studies (AAASS), the main academic society for scholars of Russia, Central, and Eastern Europe in the United States. He was a co-recipient of the AAASS award for distinguished contributions to Slavic studies in 2001.

In 2004, Daniels was awarded an honorary Doctor of Law degree by the University of Vermont and the university created the Robert V. Daniels Award for Outstanding Contributions in the field of International Studies.

=== Political career ===
Daniels was active in the Democratic Party. He was elected to the Vermont State Senate as a Democrat in 1973 from Chittenden County and re-elected several times, serving in that capacity until 1982.

Dust jacket of the first edition of Daniels' book Red October (1967).

=== Death and legacy ===
Daniels died March 28, 2010. He was 84 years old.

== Scholarship ==
Although best remembered as the author and editor of a series of paperback academic textbooks targeted at university undergraduates, Daniels contributed two important works of history during the decade of the 1960s.

In The Conscience of the Revolution: Communist Opposition in Soviet Russia, Daniels revisited the origins of the Russian Social Democratic Labour Party in Russia, depicting the Bolshevik organization as a multi-tendency organization from its inception through the assertion of full control by Joseph Stalin during the collectivization campaign of 1929. "Fundamental changes were taking place in the movement during these years," Daniels argued, and therefore "present-day Communism must accordingly be regarded as the evolutionary product of circumstances." Such a view stood in opposition to the dominant totalitarian model of the day, which tended to depict the Soviet Union as monolithic and immutable without the exertion of external force.

In Red October: The Bolshevik Revolution of 1917, published in 1967 at the time of the 50th anniversary of the Russian Revolution, Daniels returned to his vision of a multi-tendency Bolshevik Party. In this work, Daniels detailed the confusion and process of persuasion by Lenin over the party leadership, which culminated in the insurrection of November 1917. As Daniels himself noted, his book was dedicated to showing the process by which the Bolsheviks managed to seize power at the center of the Russian Empire, rather than examining the social background of the revolutionaries and their opponents, contributing factors in Russian society, or the nature of the revolution at the periphery of the empire, away from the urban center.

Daniels' emphasis on the multi-tendency nature of the early Bolshevik organization, with its implications of multiple possible paths of development rather than an inherent road to totalitarian dictatorship, presaged the work of a generation of younger political historians such as Stephen F. Cohen and the wave of social historians who came to the fore in the profession of Soviet studies during the decades of the 1970s and 1980s.

== Works ==
=== Theses and dissertations ===
- "Current Developments in Union Wage Policy." Harvard University, A.B. Honors Thesis, 1945.
- "The Left Opposition in the Russian Communist Party, to 1924." Harvard University, Ph.D. dissertation, 1950.

=== Books ===
- The Conscience of the Revolution: Communist Opposition in Soviet Russia. Cambridge, Massachusetts: Harvard University Press, 1960.
- A Documentary History of Communism. (Editor.) New York: Random House, 1960.
- The Nature of Communism. New York: Random House, 1962.
- Russia. Engelwood Cliffs, NJ: Prentice Hall, 1964.
- Understanding Communism. Syracuse, NY: L.W. Singer Co., 1964.
- Marxism and Communism: Essential Readings. (Editor.) New York: Random House, 1965.
- The Stalin Revolution: Fulfillment or Betrayal of Communism? (Editor.) Boston: D.C. Heath, 1965.
- Studying History: How and Why. Engelwood Cliffs, NJ: Prentice Hall, 1966.
- Red October: The Bolshevik Revolution of 1917. New York: Charles Scribner's Sons, 1967.
- The Russian Revolution. Engelwood Cliffs, NJ: Prentice Hall, 1972.
- The Stalin Revolution: Foundations of Soviet Totalitarianism. Lexington, MA: D.C. Heath, 1972.
- Fodor's Europe Talking: A Guide to Nineteen National Languages. New York: David McKay, 1975.
- Office Holding and Elite Status in the Central Committee of the CPSU. Cambridge, Massachusetts: Harvard University Press, 1976.
- The Dynamics of Soviet Politics. With Paul Cocks and Nancy Whittier Heer. Cambridge, Massachusetts: Harvard University Press, 1976.
- The Militarization of Socialism in Russia, 1902-1946. Washington, DC: The Wilson Center, Kennan Institute for Advanced Russian Studies, 1985.
- Russia: The Roots of Confrontation. Cambridge, Massachusetts: Harvard University Press, 1985.
- Communism and the World. London: Tauris, 1985.
- Is Russia Reformable? Change and Resistance from Stalin to Gorbachev. Boulder, CO: Westview Press, 1988.
- Year of the Heroic Guerrilla: World Revolution and Counterrevolution in 1968. New York: Basic Books, 1989.
- The Stalin Revolution: Foundations of the Totalitarian Era. Lexington, MA: D.C. Heath, 1990.
- Trotsky, Stalin, and Socialism. Boulder, CO: Westview Press, 1991.
- The University of Vermont: The First Two Hundred Years. Hanover, NH: University of Vermont, 1991.
- The End of the Communist Revolution. London: Routledge, 1993.
- Soviet Communism from Reform to Collapse. Lexington, MA: D.C. Heath, 1995.
- Russia's Transformations: Snapshots of a Crumbling System. Lanham, MD: Rowman & Littlefield, 1997.
- The Fourth Revolution: Transformations in American Society from the Sixties to the Present. New York: Routledge, 2006.
- The Rise and Fall of Communism in Russia. New Haven, CT: Yale University Press, 2007. In Russian, 2011.

Note: Some of these books were translated into other languages, such as Spanish, German, Japanese, Korean, and Catalan.
