= History of the Soviet Union (1982–1991) =

Final years of the Soviet Union
- 1982–1991
History of the Soviet Union (1964–1982)	History of the Russian Federation
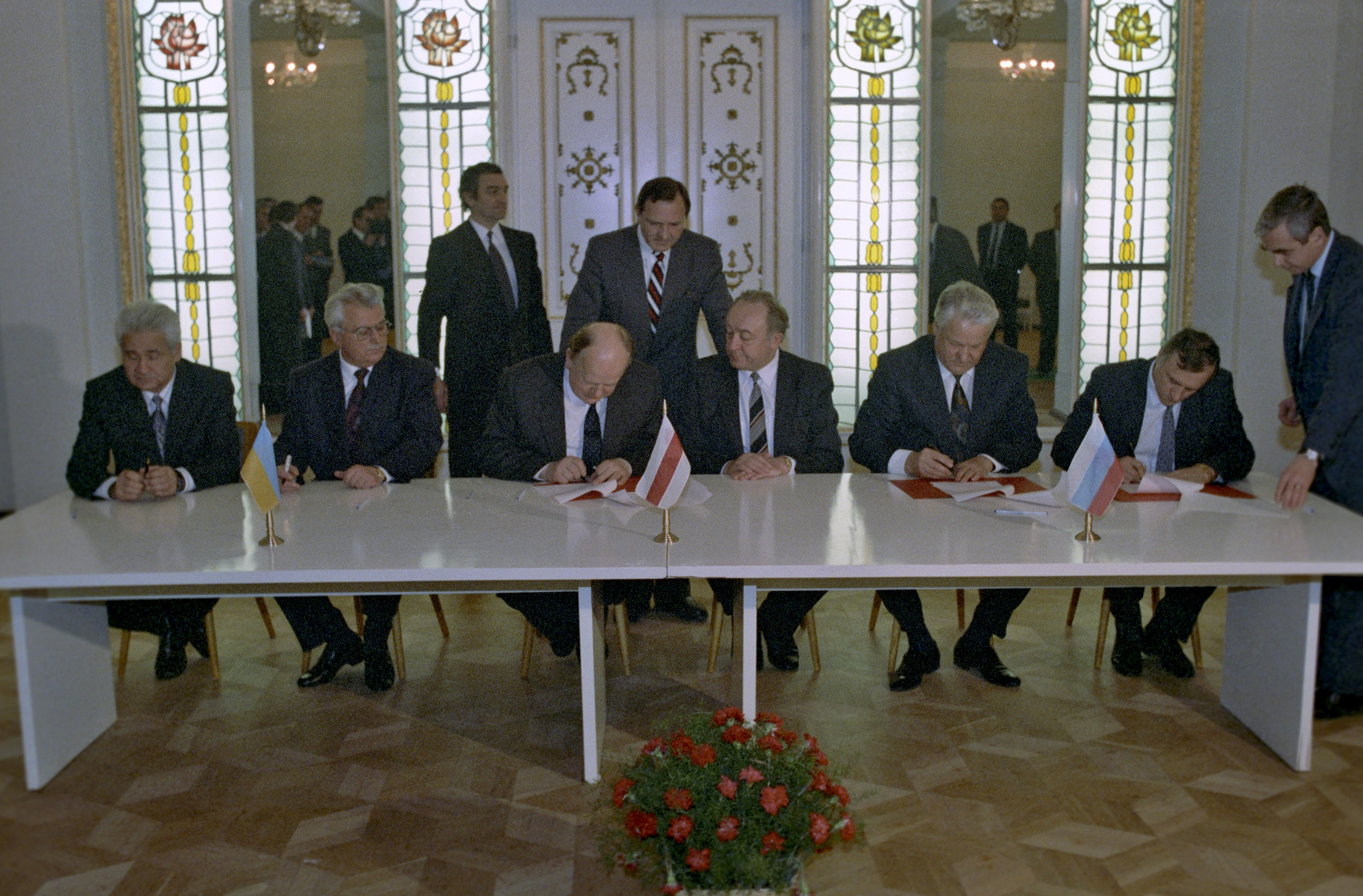
- The Belovezha Accords were signed on 8 December 1991, dissolving the Soviet Union.
- Location: Soviet Union
- Including: Cold War; Revolutions of 1989
- Leaders: Yuri Andropov; Konstantin Chernenko; Mikhail Gorbachev
- Key events: Soviet–Afghan War; Cambodian–Vietnamese War; Iran–Iraq War; Korean Airlines Flight 007; Chernobyl disaster; Kazakh protests; Soviet withdrawal from Afghanistan; Revolutions of 1989; 1989 Polish parliamentary election; 1989 Sino-Soviet Summit; 1989 Tiananmen Square protests and massacre; Pan-European Picnic; Peaceful Revolution; Fall of the Berlin Wall; Czechoslovak Velvet Revolution; USSR–US Malta Summit; Romanian revolution; Parade of sovereignties; War of Laws; Gulf War; German reunification; 1990 October Revolution Parade; Latvia: The Barricades; Lithuania: Bloody Sunday; Black January in Baku, Azerbaijan; Breakup of Yugoslavia; April 9 Tbilisi tragedy; 1991 Soviet coup attempt; Independence of Ukraine; Belovezha Accords; Alma-Ata Protocol; Dissolution of the Soviet Union

The history of the Soviet Union from 1982 through 1991 spans the period from the Soviet leader Leonid Brezhnev's death until the dissolution of the Soviet Union. Due to the years of Soviet military buildup at the expense of domestic development, and complex systemic problems in the command economy, Soviet output stagnated. Failed attempts at reform, a standstill economy, and the success of the proxies of the United States against the Soviet Union's forces in the war in Afghanistan led to a general feeling of discontent, especially in the Soviet-occupied Central and Eastern Europe (including the Baltic states).

Greater political and social freedoms, instituted by the last Soviet leader Mikhail Gorbachev, created an atmosphere of open criticism of the communist regime, and also perestroika. The dramatic drop of the price of oil in 1985 and 1986 profoundly influenced actions of the Soviet leadership.

Nikolai Tikhonov, the Chairman of the Council of Ministers, was succeeded by Nikolai Ryzhkov, and Vasili Kuznetsov, the acting Chairman of the Presidium of the Supreme Soviet of the Soviet Union, was succeeded by Andrei Gromyko, the former Minister of Foreign Affairs.

Several republics began resisting central control, and increasing democratization led to a weakening of the central government. The Soviet Union finally collapsed in 1991 when Boris Yeltsin seized power in the aftermath of a failed coup that had attempted to topple the reform-minded Gorbachev.

== Leadership transition ==
By 1982, the stagnation of the Soviet economy was obvious, as evidenced by the fact that the Soviet Union had been importing grain from the U.S. throughout the 1970s, but the system was so firmly entrenched that any real change seemed impossible. A huge rate of defense spending consumed large parts of the economy. The transition period that separated the Brezhnev and Gorbachev eras resembled the former much more than the latter, although hints of reform emerged as early as 1983.

=== Andropov interregnum ===
Brezhnev died on 10 November 1982. After a two-day power struggle Yuri Andropov became the new General Secretary. He maneuvered his way into power both through his KGB connections and by gaining the support of the military by promising not to cut defense spending. For comparison, some of his rivals such as Konstantin Chernenko were skeptical of a continued high military budget. Aged 68, Andropov was the oldest person ever appointed as General Secretary. Andropov began a thorough house-cleaning throughout the party and state bureaucracy, a decision made easy by the fact that the Central Committee had an average age of 69. He replaced more than one-fifth of the Soviet ministers and regional party first secretaries and more than one-third of the department heads within the Central Committee apparatus. As a result, he replaced the aging leadership with younger, more vigorous administrators. But Andropov's ability to reshape the top leadership was constrained by his own age and poor health and the influence of Chernenko, his rival and longtime ally of Brezhnev who had previously supervised personnel matters in the Central Committee.

The transition of power from Brezhnev to Andropov was notably the first one in Soviet history to occur completely peacefully with no one being imprisoned, killed, or forced from office.

==== Domestic policies ====
Andropov's domestic policy leaned heavily towards restoring discipline and order to Soviet society. He eschewed radical political and economic reforms, promoting instead a small degree of candor in politics and mild economic experiments similar to those that had been associated with the late Premier Alexei Kosygin's initiatives in the mid-1960s. In tandem with such economic experiments, Andropov launched an anti-corruption drive that reached high into the government and party ranks. Unlike Brezhnev, who possessed several mansions and a fleet of luxury cars, he lived quite simply. While visiting Budapest in early 1983, he expressed interest in Hungary's Goulash Communism and that the sheer size of the Soviet economy made strict top-down planning impractical. Changes were needed in a hurry for 1982 had witnessed the country's worst economic performance, with real GDP growth at almost zero percent.

==== Foreign policies ====
Andropov faced a series of foreign policy crises: the hopeless situation of the Soviet army in Afghanistan, threatened revolt in Poland, growing animosity with China, the polarization threat of war in the Middle East, and troubles in Ethiopia and South Africa. The most critical threat was the "Second Cold War" launched by American President Ronald Reagan and a specific attack on rolling back what he denounced as the "Evil Empire". Reagan was using American economic power, and Soviet economic weakness, to escalate massive spending on the Cold War, emphasizing high technology that Moscow lacked. The main response was raising the military budget to 70 percent of the national budget, and supplying billions of dollars' worth of military aid to Syria, Iraq, Libya, South Yemen, the PLO, Cuba, and North Korea. That included tanks and armored troop carriers, hundreds of fighter planes, as well as anti-aircraft systems, artillery systems, and all sorts of high tech equipment for which the USSR was the main supplier for its allies. Andropov's main goal was to avoid an open war.

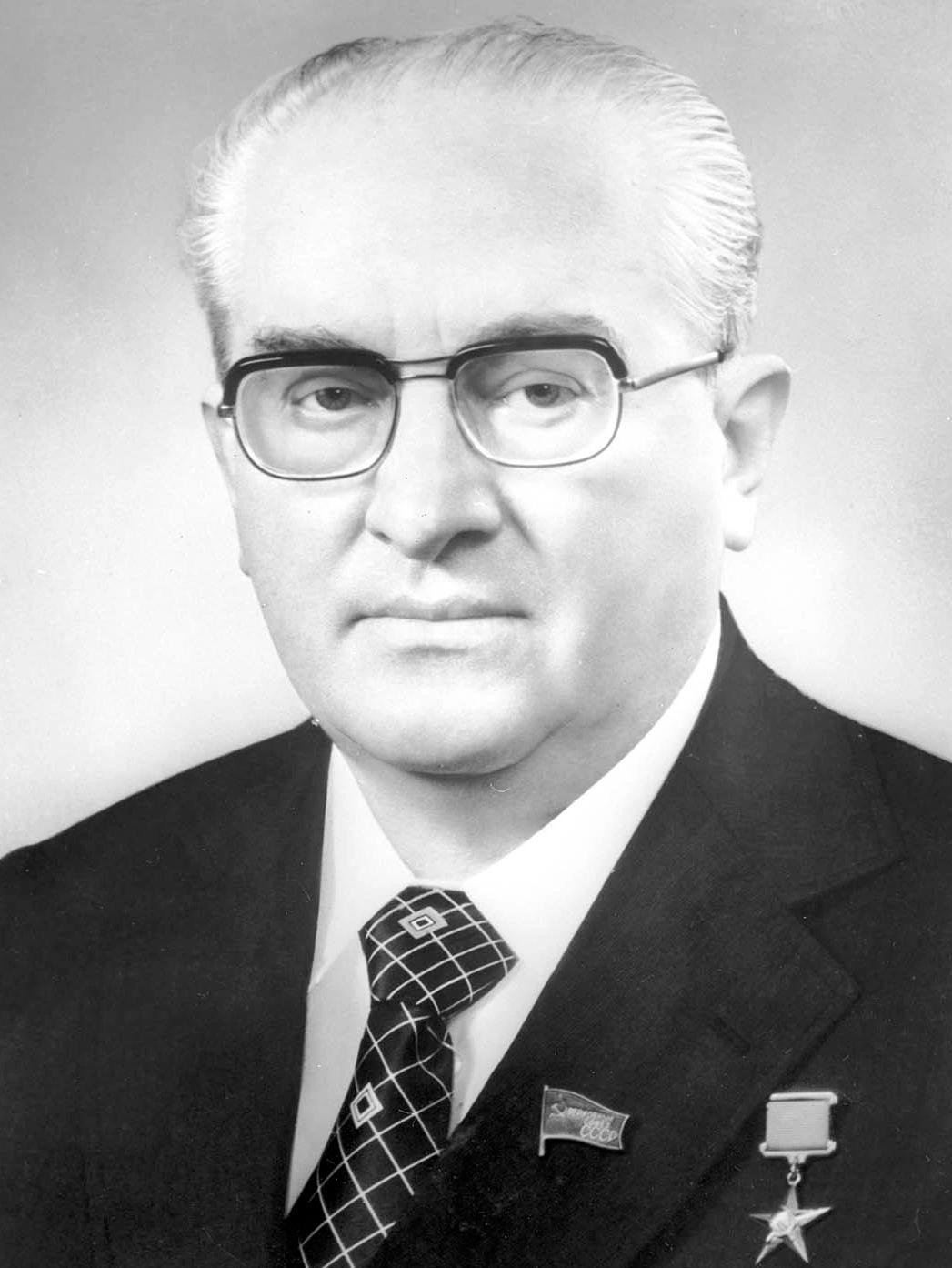
Yuri Andropov

In foreign policy, the conflict in Afghanistan continued even though Andropov—who now felt the invasion was a mistake—half-heartedly explored options for a negotiated withdrawal. Andropov's rule was also marked by deterioration of relations with the United States. During a much-publicized "walk in the woods" with Soviet dignitary Yuli Kvitsinsky, American diplomat Paul Nitze suggested a compromise for reducing nuclear missiles in Europe on both sides that was ultimately ignored by the Politburo. Kvitsinsky would later write that, despite his own efforts, the Soviet leadership was not interested in compromise, instead calculating that peace movements in the West would force the Americans to capitulate. On 8 March 1983, during Andropov's reign as General Secretary, U.S. President Ronald Reagan labeled the Soviet Union an "evil empire". The same month, on 23 March, Reagan announced the Strategic Defense Initiative. Reagan claimed this research program into ballistic missile defense would be "consistent with our obligations under the ABM Treaty". However, Andropov was dismissive of this claim, and said that "It is time they [Washington] stopped ... search[ing] for the best ways of unleashing nuclear war. ... Engaging in this is not just irresponsible. It is insane".

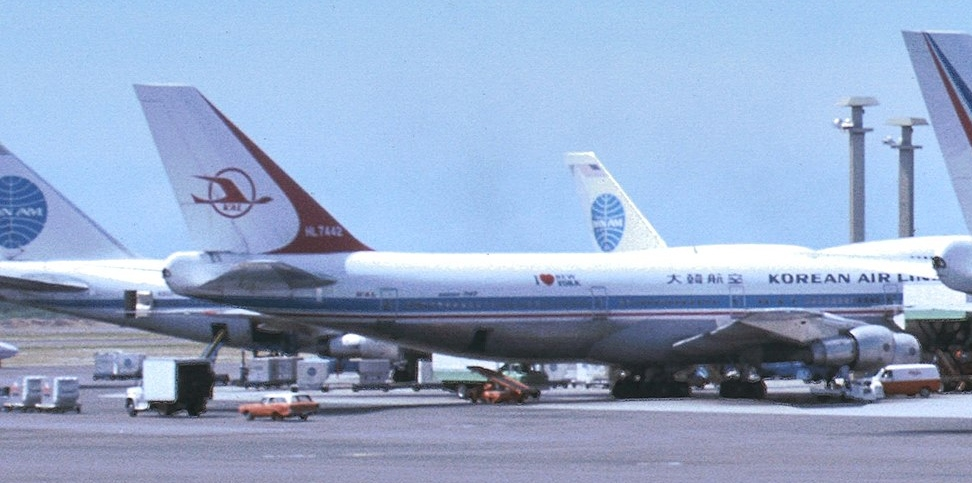
A photograph of Korean Air Lines HL7442, the airliner shot down by Soviet aircraft after drifting into prohibited airspace during the KAL 007 Flight.

In August 1983, Andropov announced that the country was stopping all work on space-based weapons. Meanwhile, Soviet–U.S. arms control talks on intermediate-range nuclear weapons in Europe were suspended by the Soviet Union in November 1983 and by the end of the year, the Soviets had broken off all arms control negotiations.

Massive bad publicity worldwide came when Soviet fighters shot down a civilian jet liner, Korean Air Lines Flight 007, which carried 269 passengers and crew. It had strayed over the Soviet Union on 1 September 1983 on its scheduled route from Anchorage, Alaska, to Seoul, South Korea. The Soviet system was unprepared to deal with a civilian airliner, and the shooting down was a matter of following orders without question. Instead of admitting an accident, Soviet media proclaimed a brave decision to meet a Western provocation. Together with its low credibility explanation in 1986 of the meltdown of the nuclear reactor at Chernobyl, the episode demonstrated an inability to deal with public relations crises; the propaganda system was only aimed at people who already were committed friends of the Soviet Union. Both crises were escalated by technological and organizational failures, compounded by human error.

US−Soviet relations deteriorated rapidly especially after evil empire denunciation. The official press agency TASS accused Reagan of "thinking only in terms of confrontation and bellicose, lunatic anti-communism". Further Soviet outrage was directed at Reagan's stationing of intermediate-range nuclear missiles in Western Europe. In Afghanistan, Angola, Nicaragua and elsewhere, under the Reagan Doctrine, the US began undermining Soviet-supported governments by supplying arms to anti-communist resistance movements in these countries.

Reagan's decision to deploy medium-range Pershing II missiles in Western Europe met with mass protests in countries such as France and West Germany, sometimes numbering 1 million people at a time. Many Europeans became convinced that the US and not the Soviet Union was the more aggressive country, and there was fear over the prospect of a war, especially since there was a widespread conviction in Europe that the US, being separated from the Red Army by two oceans as opposed to a short land border, was insensitive to the people of Germany and other countries. Moreover, the memory of World War II was still strong and many Germans could not forget the destruction and mass rapes committed by Soviet troops in the closing days of that conflict. This attitude was helped along by the Reagan Administration's comments that a war between NATO and the Warsaw Pact would not necessarily result in the use of nuclear weapons.

==== Andropov's death and legacy ====
Andropov's health declined rapidly during the tense summer and fall of 1983, and he became the first Soviet leader to miss the anniversary celebrations of the 1917 revolution that November. He died in February 1984 of kidney failure after disappearing from public view for several months.

Among his legacy to the Soviet Union was his discovery and promotion of Mikhail Gorbachev. Beginning in 1978, Gorbachev advanced in two years through the Kremlin hierarchy to full membership in the Politburo. His responsibilities for the appointment of personnel allowed him to make the contacts and distribute the favors necessary for a future bid to become general secretary. At this point, Western experts believed that Andropov was grooming Gorbachev as his successor. However, although Gorbachev acted as a deputy to the general secretary throughout Andropov's illness, Gorbachev's time had not yet arrived when his patron died early in 1984.

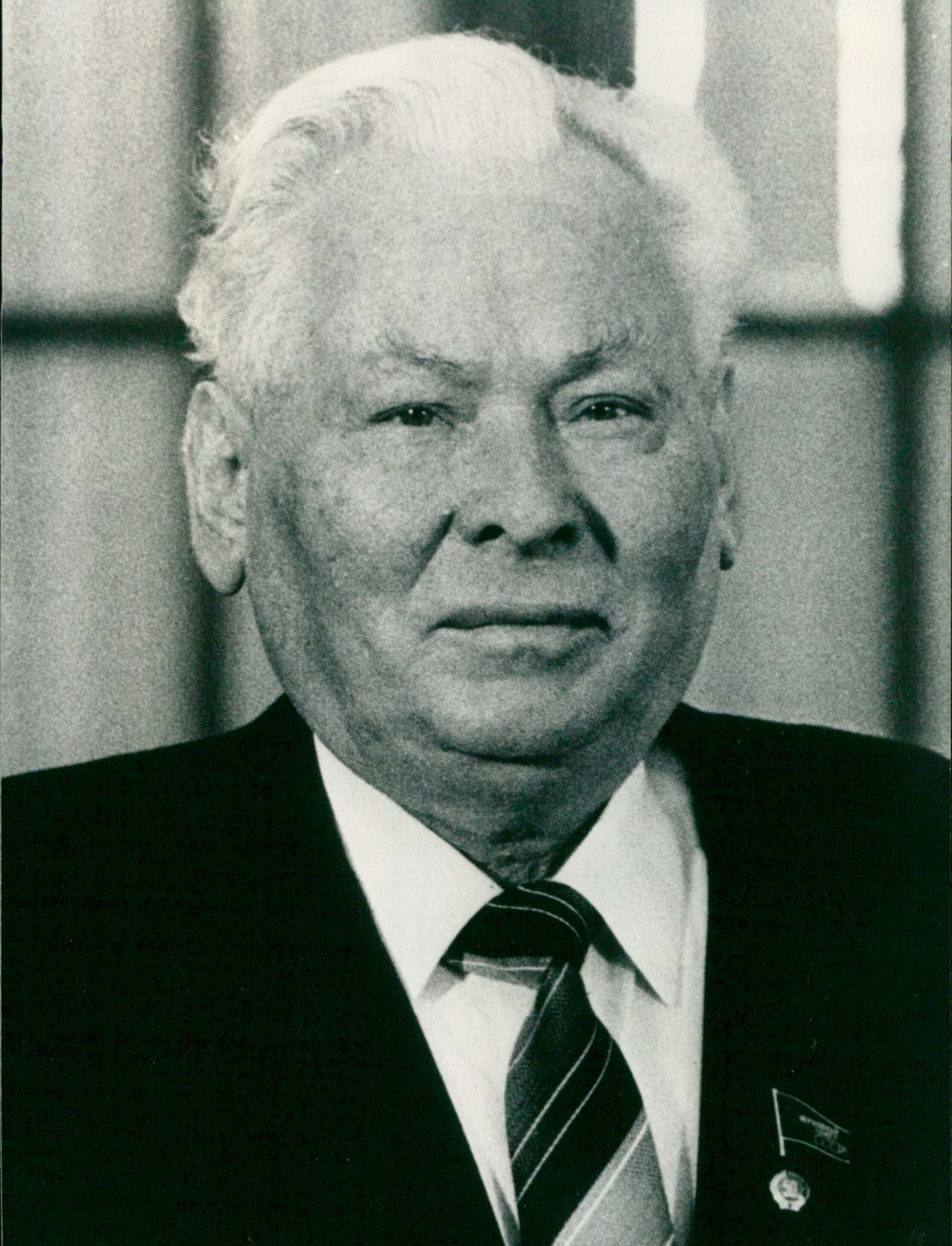
Konstantin Chernenko

=== Chernenko interregnum ===
At 73, Konstantin Chernenko was in poor health, suffering from emphysema, and unable to play an active role in policy making when he was chosen, after lengthy discussion, to succeed Andropov. But Chernenko's short time in office did bring some significant policy changes. The personnel changes and investigations into corruption undertaken under Andropov's tutelage came to an end. Chernenko advocated more investment in consumer goods and services and in agriculture. He also called for a reduction in the Communist Party of the Soviet Union's (CPSU) micromanagement of the economy and greater attention to public opinion. However, KGB repression of Soviet dissidents also increased. In February 1983, Soviet representatives withdrew from the World Psychiatric Organization in protest of that group's continued complaints about the use of psychiatry to suppress dissent. This policy was underlined in June when Vladimir Danchev, a broadcaster for Radio Moscow, referred to the Soviet troops in the Democratic Republic of Afghanistan as "invaders" while conducting English-language broadcasts. After refusing to retract this statement, he was sent to a mental institution for several months. Valery Senderov, a leader of an unofficial union of professional workers, was sentenced to seven years in a labor camp early in the year for speaking out on discrimination practiced against Jews in education and the professions.

Although Chernenko had called for renewed détente with the West, little progress was made towards closing the rift in East−West relations during his rule. The Soviet Union boycotted the 1984 Summer Olympics in Los Angeles, retaliating for the United States-led boycott of the 1980 Summer Olympics in Moscow. In September 1984, the Soviet Union also prevented a visit to West Germany by East German leader Erich Honecker. Fighting in Afghanistan also intensified, but in the late autumn of 1984 the United States and the Soviet Union did agree to resume arms control talks in early 1985.

== Rise of Gorbachev ==
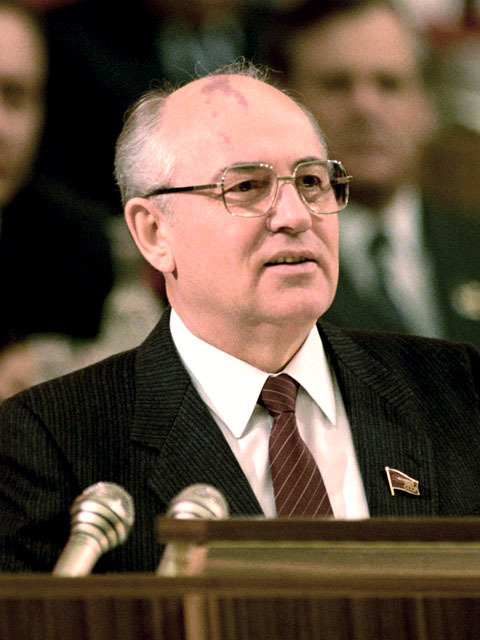
Mikhail Gorbachev

In addition to the failing economy, the prolonged war in Afghanistan led to increased public dissatisfaction with the Communist regime. Also, the Chernobyl disaster in 1986 added motive force to Gorbachev's glasnost and perestroika reforms, which eventually spiraled out of control and caused the Soviet system to collapse.

=== Ousting the old guard ===
After years of stagnation, the "new thinking" of younger Communist apparatchik began to emerge. Following the death of terminally ill Konstantin Chernenko, the Politburo elected Mikhail Gorbachev to the position of General Secretary of the Communist Party of the Soviet Union in March 1985. At 54, Gorbachev was the youngest person since Joseph Stalin to become General Secretary and the country's first head of state born a Soviet citizen instead of a subject of the tsar. During his official confirmation on 11 March, Foreign Minister Andrei Gromyko spoke of how the new Soviet leader had filled in for Chernenko as CC Secretariat, and praised his intelligence and flexible, pragmatic ideas instead of rigid adherence to party ideology. Gorbachev was aided by a lack of serious competition in the Politburo. He immediately began appointing younger men of his generation to important party posts, including Nikolai Ryzhkov, Secretary of Economics, Viktor Cherbrikov, KGB Chief, Foreign Minister Eduard Shevardnadze (replacing the 75-year-old Gromyko), Secretary of Defense Industries Lev Zaikov, and Secretary of Construction Boris Yeltsin. Removed from the Politburo and Secretariat was Grigory Romanov, who had been Gorbachev's most significant rival for the position of General Secretary. Gromyko's removal as Foreign Minister was the most unexpected change given his decades of unflinching, faithful service compared to the unknown, inexperienced Shevardnadze.

More predictably, the 80-year-old Nikolai Tikhonov, the Chairman of the Council of Ministers, was succeeded by Nikolai Ryzhkov, and Vasili Kuznetsov, the acting Chairman of the Presidium of the Supreme Soviet of the Soviet Union, was succeeded by Andrei Gromyko, the former Minister of Foreign Affairs.

Further down the chain, up to 40% of the first secretaries of the oblasts (provinces) were replaced with younger, better educated, and more competent men. The defense establishment was also given a thorough shakeup with the commanders of all 16 military districts replaced along with all theaters of military operation, as well as the three Soviet fleets. Not since World War II had the Soviet military had such a rapid turnover of officers. Sixty-eight-year-old Marshal Nikolai Ogarkov was fully rehabilitated after having fallen from favor in 1983–84 due to his handling of the KAL 007 shootdown and his ideas about improving Soviet strategic and tactical doctrines were made into an official part of defense policy, although some of his other ambitions such as developing the military into a smaller, tighter force based on advanced technology were not considered feasible for the time being. Many, but not all, of the younger army officers appointed during 1985 were proteges of Ogarkov.

Gorbachev got off to an excellent start during his first months in power. He projected an aura of youth and dynamism compared to his aged predecessors and made frequent walks in the streets of the major cities answering questions from ordinary citizens. He became the first leader that spoke with the Soviet people in person. When he made public speeches, he made clear that he was interested in constructive exchanges of ideas instead of merely reciting lengthy platitudes about the excellence of the Soviet system. He also spoke candidly about the slackness and run-down condition of Soviet society in recent years, blaming alcohol abuse, poor workplace discipline, and other factors for these situations. Alcohol was a particular nag of Gorbachev's, especially as he himself did not drink, and he made one of his major policy aims curbing the consumption of it.

=== Foreign policy ===
In terms of foreign policy, the most important one, relations with the United States, remained twitchy through 1985. In October, Gorbachev made his first visit to a non-communist country when he traveled to France and was warmly received. The fashion-conscious French were also captivated by his wife Raisa and political pundits widely believed that the comparatively young Soviet leader would have a PR advantage over President Reagan, who was 20 years his senior.

Reagan and Gorbachev met for the first time in Geneva in November. The three weeks preceding the summit meeting were marked by an unprecedented Soviet media campaign against the Strategic Defense Initiative (SDI), taking advantage of opposition at home in the US to the program. When it finally took place, the two superpower leaders established a solid rapport that boded well for the future despite Reagan's refusal to compromise on abandonment of SDI. A joint communique by both parties stated that they were in agreement that nuclear war could not be won by either side and must never be allowed to happen. It was also agreed that Reagan and Gorbachev would carry out two more summit meetings in 1986–87.

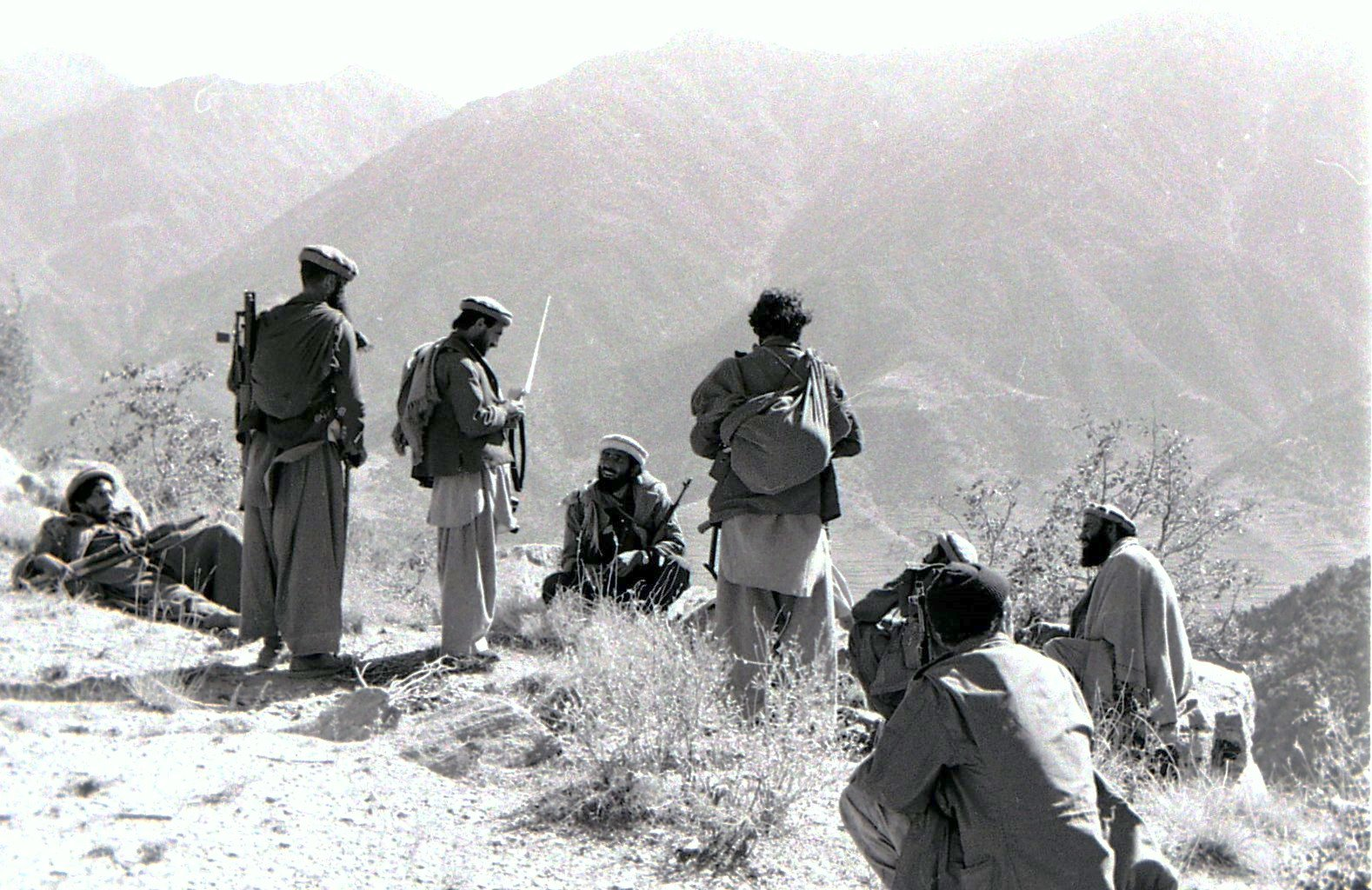
Afghan mujahideen forces in Kunar Province in 1987

Jimmy Carter had decisively ended the policy of détente by financially aiding the mujahideen movement in Afghanistan. This served as a pretext for the Soviet intervention in Afghanistan six months later with the aims of supporting the Afghan government, controlled by the People's Democratic Party of Afghanistan. Tensions between the superpowers increased during this time, when Carter placed trade embargoes on the Soviet Union and stated that the Soviet invasion of Afghanistan was "the most serious threat to the peace since the Second World War."

=== Economy ===
East-West tensions increased during the 1981–1985 first term of US President Ronald Reagan, reaching levels not seen since the Cuban Missile Crisis as Reagan increased US military spending to 7% of the GDP. To match the military buildup, the Soviet Union increased its own military spending to 27% of its GDP and froze production of civilian goods at 1980 levels, causing a sharp economic decline in the already failing Soviet economy.

The US financed the training for the mujahideen warlords in the Democratic Republic of Afghanistan, which eventually culminated in fall of the Soviet satellite state. While the CIA and MI6 and the People's Liberation Army of China financed the operation along with the Pakistan government against the Soviet Union, eventually the Soviet Union began looking for a withdrawal route and in 1988 the Geneva Accords were signed between Communist-Afghanistan and the Islamic Republic of Pakistan; under the terms Soviet troops were to withdraw. Once the withdrawal was complete the Pakistan ISI continued to support the mujahideen against the Communist Government and by 1992, the government collapsed. US President Reagan also actively hindered the Soviet Union's ability to sell natural gas to Europe whilst simultaneously actively working to keep gas prices low, which kept the price of Soviet oil low and further starved the Soviet Union of foreign capital. This "long-term strategic offensive," which contrasts with the essentially reactive and defensive strategy of "containment", accelerated the fall of the Soviet Union by encouraging it to overextend its economic base.

The proposition that special operations by the CIA in Saudi Arabia affected the prices of Soviet oil was refuted by Marshall Goldman—one of the leading experts on the economy of the Soviet Union. He pointed out that the Saudis decreased their production of oil in 1985 (it reached a 16-year low), whereas the peak of oil production was reached in 1980. They increased the production of oil in 1986, reduced it in 1987 with a subsequent increase in 1988, but not to the levels of 1980 when production reached its highest level. The real increase happened in 1990, by which time the Cold War was almost over. Goldman asked why, if Saudi Arabia had such an effect on Soviet oil prices, did prices not fall in 1980 when the production of oil by Saudi Arabia reached its highest level—three times as much oil as in the mid-eighties—and why did the Saudis wait till 1990 to increase their production, five years after the CIA's supposed intervention? Why didn't the Soviet Union collapse in 1980 then?

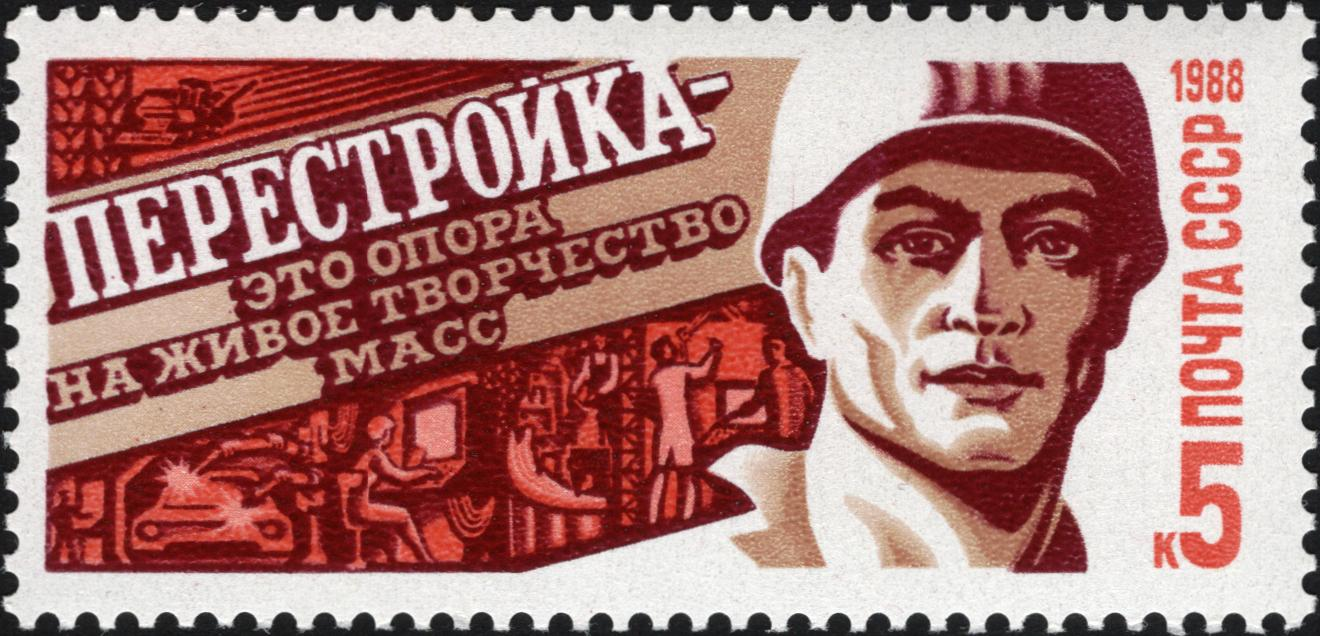
1988 Soviet stamp commemorating perestroika

By the time Gorbachev ushered in the process that would lead to the dismantling of the Soviet administrative command economy through his programs of uskoreniye (speed-up of economic development) and perestroika (political and economic restructuring) announced in 1986, the Soviet economy suffered from both hidden inflation and pervasive supply shortages aggravated by an increasingly open black market that undermined the official economy. Additionally, the costs of superpower status—the military, space program, subsidies to client states—were out of proportion to the Soviet economy. The new wave of industrialization based upon information technology had left the Soviet Union desperate for Western technology and credits in order to counter its increasing backwardness.

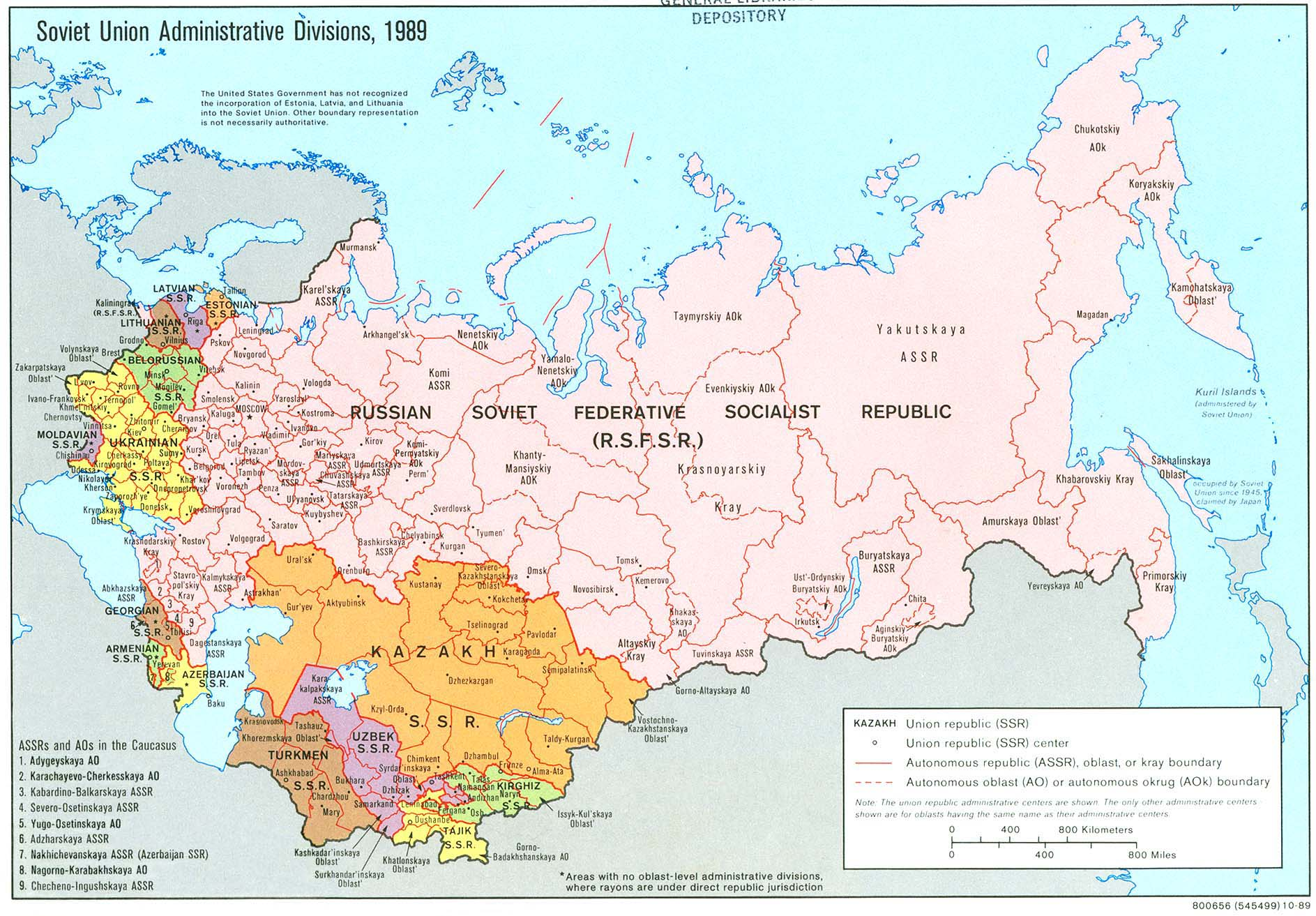
Soviet Union administrative divisions, 1989

=== Reforms ===
The Law on Cooperatives enacted in May 1988 was perhaps the most radical of the economic reforms during the early part of the Gorbachev era. For the first time since Vladimir Lenin's New Economic Policy, the law permitted private ownership of businesses in the services, manufacturing, and foreign-trade sectors. Under this provision, cooperative restaurants, shops, and manufacturers became part of the Soviet scene.

Glasnost resulted in greater freedom of speech and the press becoming far less controlled. Thousands of political prisoners and many dissidents were also released. Soviet social science became free to explore and publish on many subjects that had previously been off limits, including conducting public opinion polls. The All−Union Center for Public Opinion Research (VCIOM)—the most prominent of several polling organizations that were started then— was opened. State archives became more accessible, and some social statistics that had been kept secret became open for research and publication on sensitive subjects such as income disparities, crime, suicide, abortion, and infant mortality. The first center for gender studies was opened within a newly formed Institute for the Socio−Economic Study of Human Population.

In January 1987, Gorbachev called for democratization: the infusion of democratic elements such as multi-candidate elections into the Soviet political process. A 1987 conference convened by Soviet economist and Gorbachev adviser Leonid Abalkin, concluded: "Deep transformations in the management of the economy cannot be realized without corresponding changes in the political system."

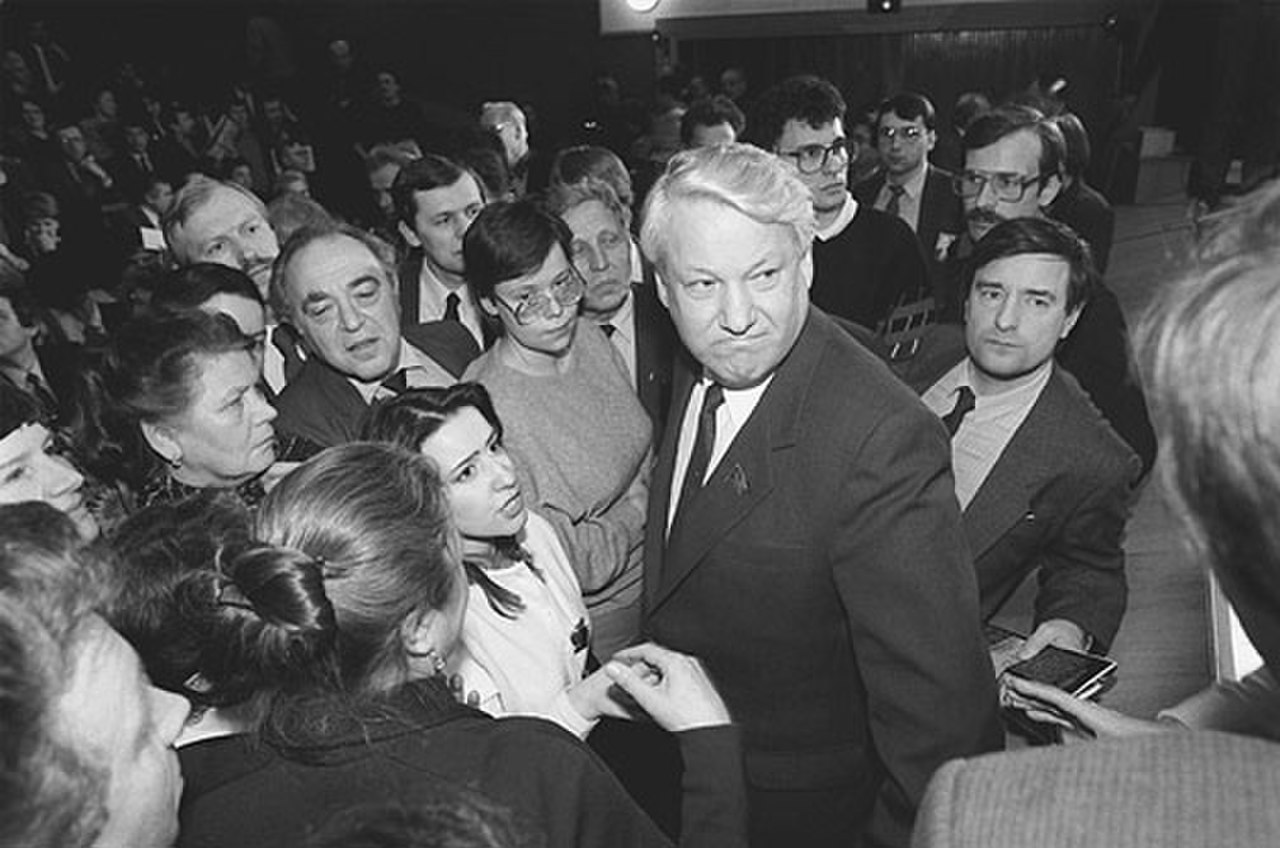
Boris Yeltsin during his electoral campaign in 1989

In June 1988, at the CPSU's Nineteenth Party Conference, Gorbachev launched radical reforms meant to reduce party control of the government apparatus. On 1 December 1988, the Supreme Soviet amended the Soviet constitution to allow for the establishment of a Congress of People's Deputies as the Soviet Union's new supreme legislative body.

Elections to the new Congress of People's Deputies were held throughout the USSR in March and April 1989. Gorbachev, as General Secretary of the Communist Party, could be forced to resign at any moment if the communist elite became dissatisfied with him. To proceed with reforms opposed by the majority of the communist party, Gorbachev aimed to consolidate power in a new position, President of the Soviet Union, which was independent from the CPSU and the soviets (councils) and whose holder could be impeached only in case of direct violation of the law. On 15 March 1990, Gorbachev was elected as the first executive president. At the same time, Article 6 of the constitution was changed to deprive the CPSU of a monopoly on political power.

=== Unintended consequences ===
Gorbachev's efforts to streamline the Communist system offered promise, but ultimately proved uncontrollable and resulted in a cascade of events that eventually concluded with the dissolution of the Soviet Union. Initially intended as tools to bolster the Soviet economy, the policies of perestroika and glasnost soon led to unintended consequences.

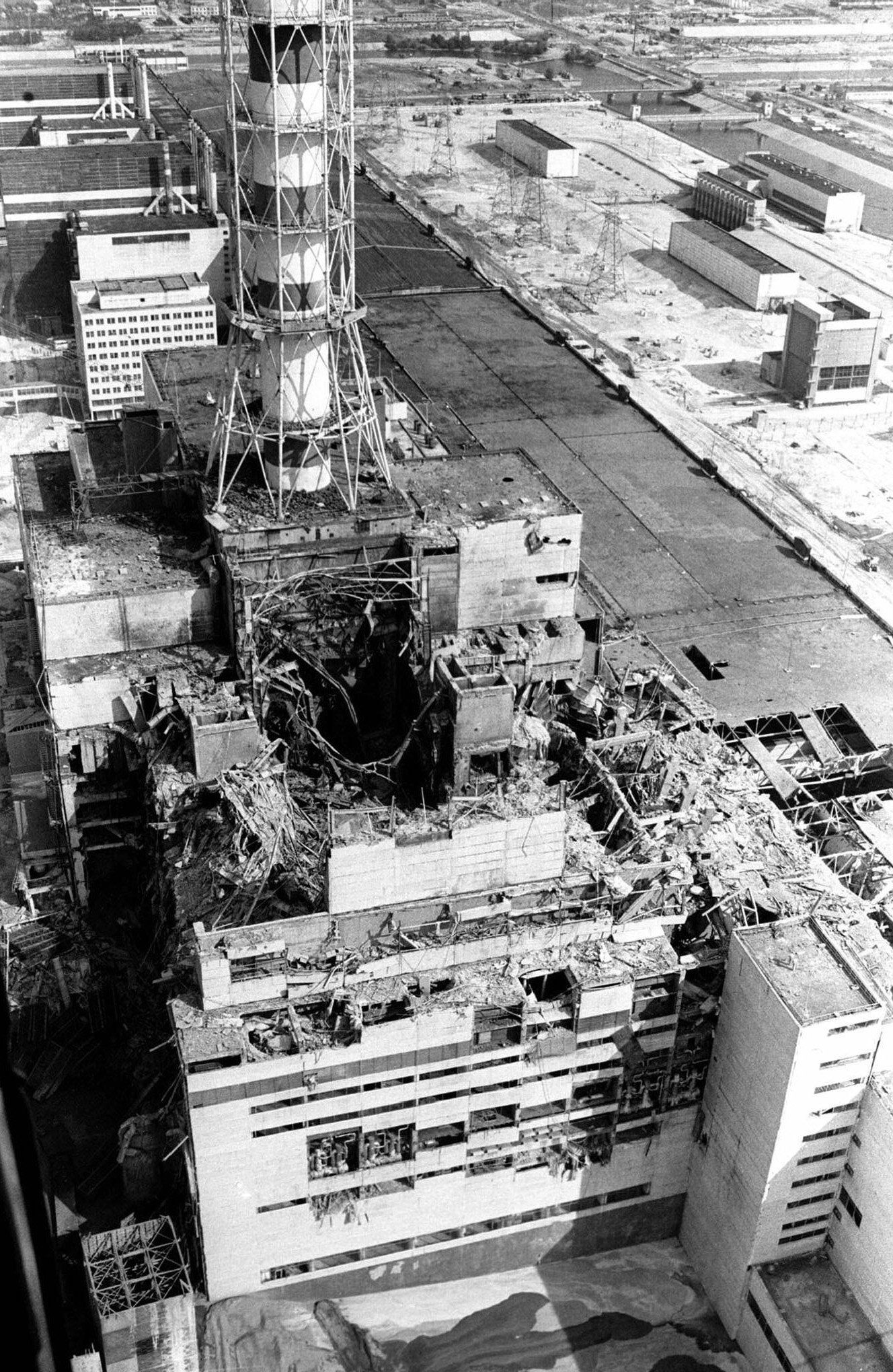
Reactor no.4 of the Chernobyl Nuclear Power Plant, months after the 1986 Chernobyl disaster

Relaxation under glasnost resulted in the Communist Party losing its absolute grip on the media. Before long, and much to the embarrassment of the authorities, the media began to expose severe social and economic problems the Soviet government had long denied and actively concealed. Problems receiving increased attention included poor housing, alcoholism, drug abuse, pollution, outdated Stalin-era factories, and petty to large-scale corruption, all of which the official media had ignored. Media reports also exposed crimes committed by Joseph Stalin and the Soviet regime, such as the gulags, his treaty with Adolf Hitler, and the Great Purges, which had been ignored by the official media. Moreover, the ongoing war in Afghanistan, and the mishandling of the 1986 Chernobyl disaster, further damaged the credibility of the Soviet government at a time when dissatisfaction was increasing.

In all, the positive view of Soviet life long presented to the public by the official media was rapidly fading, and the negative aspects of life in the Soviet Union were brought into the spotlight. This undermined the faith of the public in the Soviet system and eroded the Communist Party's social power base, threatening the identity and integrity of the Soviet Union itself.

Fraying amongst the members of the Warsaw Pact countries and instability of its western allies, first indicated by Lech Wałęsa's 1980 rise to leadership of the trade union Solidarity, accelerated, leaving the Soviet Union unable to depend upon its Eastern European satellite states for protection as a buffer zone. By 1989, following his doctrine of "new political thinking", Gorbachev had repudiated the Brezhnev Doctrine in favor of non-intervention in the internal affairs of its Warsaw Pact allies ("Sinatra Doctrine"). Gradually, each of the Warsaw Pact countries saw their communist governments fall to popular elections and, in the case of Romania, a violent uprising. By 1990, the governments of Bulgaria, Czechoslovakia, East Germany, Hungary, Poland and Romania, all of which had been imposed after World War II, were brought down as revolutions swept Eastern Europe.

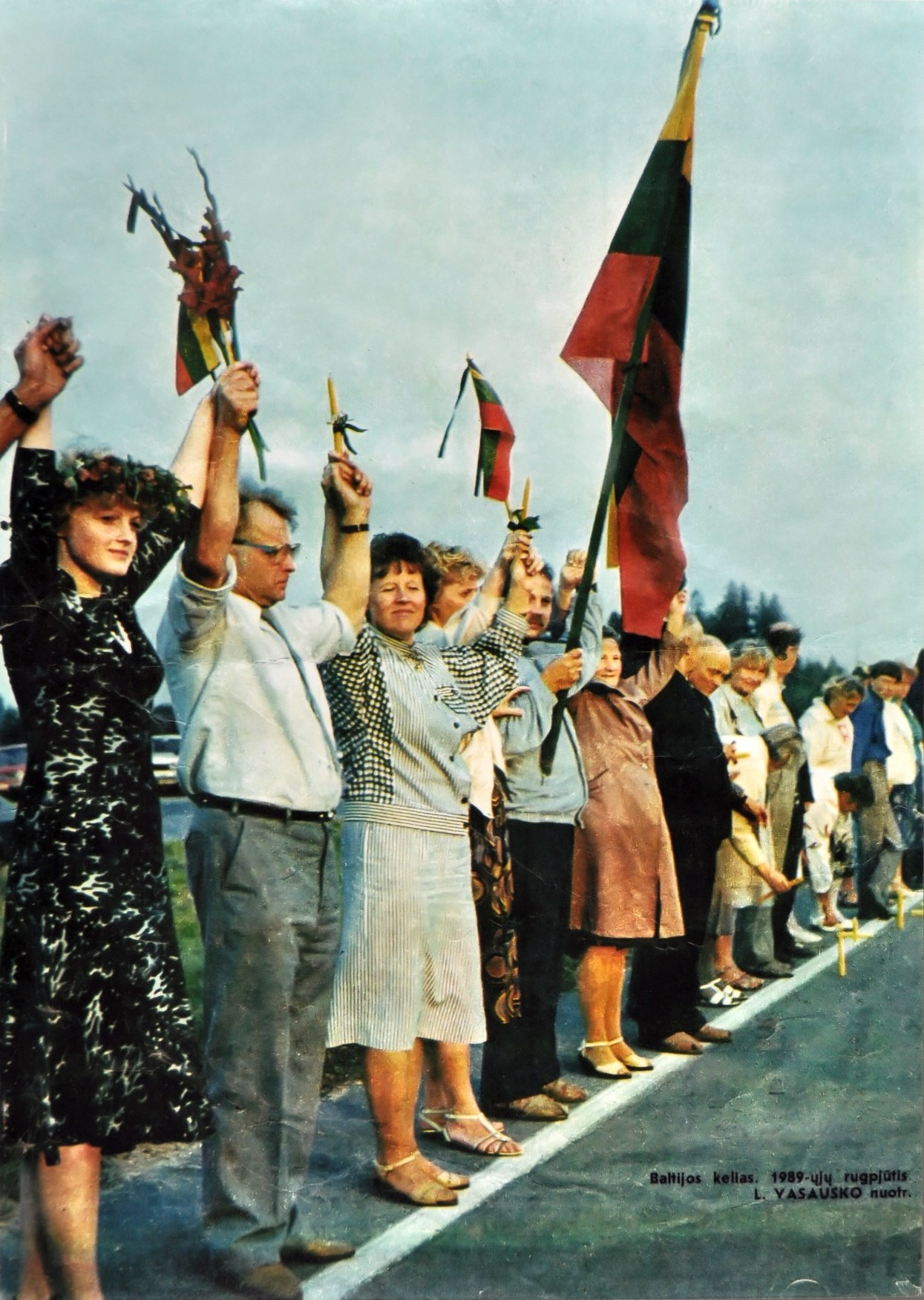
A protest of the Baltic Way in 1989

The Soviet Union also began experiencing upheaval as the political consequences of glasnost reverberated throughout the country. Despite efforts at containment, the upheaval in Eastern Europe inevitably spread to nationalities within the USSR. In elections to the regional assemblies of the Soviet Union's constituent republics, nationalists as well as radical reformers swept the board. As Gorbachev had weakened the system of internal political repression, the ability of the USSR's central Moscow government to impose its will on the USSR's constituent republics had been largely undermined. Massive peaceful protests in the Baltic republics such as the Baltic Way and the Singing Revolution drew international attention and bolstered independence movements in various other regions.

The rise of nationalism under freedom of speech soon re-awakened simmering ethnic tensions in various Soviet republics, further discrediting the ideal of a unified Soviet people. One instance occurred in February 1988, when the government in Nagorno-Karabakh, a predominantly ethnic Armenian region in the Azerbaijan SSR, passed a resolution calling for unification with the Armenian SSR. Violence against local Azerbaijanis was reported on Soviet television, provoking massacres of Armenians in the Azerbaijani city of Sumgait.

Emboldened by the liberalized atmosphere of glasnost, public dissatisfaction with economic conditions was much more overt than ever before in the Soviet period. Although perestroika was considered bold in the context of Soviet history, Gorbachev's attempts at economic reform were not radical enough to restart the country's chronically sluggish economy in the late 1980s. The reforms made some inroads in decentralization, but Gorbachev and his team left intact most of the fundamental elements of the Stalinist system, including price controls, inconvertibility of the ruble, exclusion of private property ownership, and the government monopoly over most means of production.

The value of all consumer goods manufactured in 1990 in retail prices was about 459 billion rubles ($2.1 trillion). Nevertheless, the Soviet government had lost control over economic conditions. Government spending increased sharply as an increasing number of unprofitable enterprises required state support and consumer price subsidies to continue. Tax revenues declined as republic and local governments withheld tax revenues from the central government under the growing spirit of regional autonomy. The anti−alcohol campaign reduced tax revenues as well, which in 1982 accounted for about 12% of all state revenue. The elimination of central control over production decisions, especially in the consumer goods sector, led to the breakdown in traditional supplier−producer relationships without contributing to the formation of new ones. Thus, instead of streamlining the system, Gorbachev's decentralization caused new production bottlenecks.

== Dissolution of the Soviet Union ==
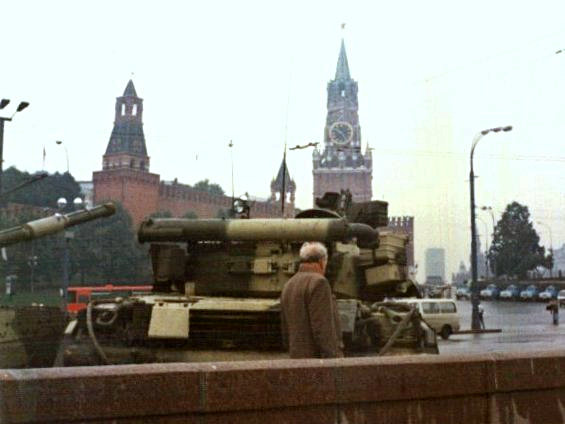
Tanks in Moscow's Red Square during the August 1991 coup attempt

The dissolution of the Soviet Union' was a process of systematic disintegration, which occurred in the economy, social structure and political structure. It resulted in the abolition of the Soviet Federal Government ("the Union center") and independence of the USSR's republics on 26 December 1991. The process was caused by a weakened Soviet government, which led to disintegration and took place from about 19 January 1990 to 26 December 1991. The process was characterized by many of the republics of the Soviet Union declaring their independence and being recognized as sovereign nation-states.

The 1991–1993 flag of the Russian Federation

Andrei Grachev, the Deputy Head of the Intelligence Department of the Central Committee, summed up the denouement of the downfall:

Gorbachev actually put the sort of final blow to the resistance of the Soviet Union by killing the fear of the people. It was still that this country was governed and kept together, as a structure, as a government structure, by the fear from Stalinist times.

== Post-Soviet restructuring ==
Following the collapse of the Soviet Union, Russia underwent a radical transformation, moving from a centrally planned economy to a globally integrated market economy. Corrupt and haphazard privatization processes turned over major state-owned firms to politically connected "oligarchs", which has left equity ownership highly concentrated.

A cabinet led by President Boris Yeltsin in the place of a prime minister took office in November 1991 with a mandate to implement economic reforms. Deputy Prime Minister Yegor Gaidar led the reform program, which began on 2 January 1992 with the lifting of price controls, and caused an immediate increase in prices. Yeltsin's program of radical, market-oriented reform came to be known as a "shock therapy". It was based on the policies associated with the Washington Consensus, recommendations of the IMF and a group of top American economists, including Larry Summers who in 1994 urged for "the three '-ations'—privatization, stabilization, and liberalization" to be "completed as soon as possible".

Russian industry and society was not prepared for the change, and Yeltsin did not have control over the Russian Central Bank, which set monetary policy. As a result, monetary policy was poorly organized and coordinated. Russia experienced hyperinflation between 1992 and 1995. Prices increased by 300% in January 1992, and by as much as 1,000% in the first three months. The inflation rate was 2,509% for the year 1992, 840% for 1993, 215% for 1994, and 131% for 1995.

The results were disastrous: the jump in prices from shock therapy wiped out the modest savings accumulated by Russians under socialism and resulted in a regressive redistribution of wealth in favour of elites who owned non-monetary assets. Shock therapy was accompanied by a drop in the standard of living, including surging economic inequality and poverty, along with increased excess mortality and a decline in life expectancy. Russia suffered the largest peacetime rise in mortality ever experienced by an industrialized country. Likewise, the consumption of meat decreased: in 1990, an average citizen of the RSFSR consumed 63 kg of meat a year; by 1999, it had decreased to 45 kg. As of 1997, the number of people living in poverty had increased by fifteen times since 1990, with about half of the population below the poverty line.

The majority of state enterprises were privatized amid great controversy and subsequently came to be owned by insiders for far less than they were worth. For example, the director of a factory during the Soviet regime would often become the owner of the same enterprise. Under the government's cover, outrageous financial manipulations were performed that enriched a narrow group of individuals at key positions of business and government. Many of them promptly invested their newfound wealth abroad, producing an enormous capital flight. This rapid privatization of public assets, and the widespread corruption associated with it, became widely known throughout Russia as прихватизация, prikhvatizatisiya, or "grab-itization".

Difficulties in collecting government revenues amid the collapsing economy and dependence on short-term borrowing to finance budget deficits led to the 1998 Russian financial crisis.

== Historiography ==
By 2020, Russian scholars had produced over 300 books, 3000 articles, and 20 dissertations about the collapse. Two approaches to the explanations were taken. The first looks at the short term, 1985–1991, emphasizing personalities. external causes and policy mistakes. The second looks at long-term economic, political, cultural, and social structures.

== See also ==
- History of the United States (1980–1991)
- Bibliography of the post-Stalinist Soviet Union
- Cold War (1985–1991)
- History of the Russian Federation
- Predictions of the collapse of the Soviet Union
- Reagan Doctrine
- Revolutions of 1989 (Eastern Europe)
