= Law on Cooperatives =

Soviet economic reform

The Law on Cooperatives was a major economic reform implemented in the Soviet Union during General Secretary Mikhail Gorbachev's perestroika and glasnost reforms. It was implemented in May 1988, allowed for independent worker-owned cooperatives to operate in the Soviet Union, as opposed to just state-owned enterprises, and gave guidelines as to how these cooperatives should be managed. While originally the law imposed high taxes and restrictions on employment, it was eventually revised so as not to discourage activity within the private sector.

== See also ==
- History of the Soviet Union (1982–91)
- Perestroika
- Uskoreniye
- Glasnost
- Demokratizatsiya (Soviet Union)
- Economy of the Socialist Federal Republic of Yugoslavia
- Market socialism
- Titoism
- Workers' self-management
