= Law On State Enterprise (Soviet) =

1988 Soviet economic law

The Law On State Enterprise (formerly The Law of State Enterprises) was a Soviet law introduced in January 1988. The law would later come under fire by hardline communists, and citizens in the years after its adoption.

== Perestroika ==
Part of perestroika, this law was enacted in order to permit managers to increase wages, in response to the tight labour situation. Under perestroika, the economy transitioned into crisis, which would later develop into a constitutional crisis. However, these increases were far in contrast of productivity growth, leading the state bank to lose control of monetary growth.

== Five-Year Plan involvement ==
The Law on State Enterprise was a main point in the twelfth and final plan of the Soviet Union. It was also a main factor in Khozraschoyt, which was defined as a method of the planned running of an economic unit based on the confrontation of the expenses incurred in production with the production output, on the compensation of expenses with the income. However, it has often been defined as "cost accounting", a term often used for management approaches in a free-market economy, something commonly associated with liberalism, the goal of the twelfth Five-Year plan.

== Foreign involvement ==
The CIA would watch the Soviets closely during this time period, in one of the major realisations for citizens of both countries, that the period of détente was over. This was largely forced by the economic and foreign policies of Ronald Reagan, widely known as being further to the right, and more reactionary than most progressive Republicans.

== See also ==
- List of Five Year Plans
- Boris Yeltsin
- Liberalism
