= Demokratizatsiya (Soviet Union) =

1987 political slogan from Mikhail Gorbachev

Demokratizatsiya (‹The template Lang-rus is being considered for deletion.› Russian: демократизация, IPA: [dʲɪməkrətʲɪˈzatsɨjə], democratization) was a slogan introduced by CPSU General Secretary Mikhail Gorbachev in January 1987 calling for the infusion of "democratic" elements into the Soviet Union's single-party government. Gorbachev's Demokratizatsiya meant the introduction of multi-candidate—though not multi-party—elections for local Communist Party (CPSU) officials and Soviets. In this way, he hoped to rejuvenate the party with reform-minded personnel who would carry out his institutional and policy reforms. The CPSU would retain sole custody of the ballot box.

The slogan of Demokratizatsiya was part of Gorbachev's set of reform programs, including glasnost (increasing public discussion of issues and accessibility of information to the public), officially announced in mid-1986, and uskoreniye, a "speed-up" of economic development. Perestroika (political and economic restructuring), another slogan that became a full-scale campaign in 1987, embraced them all.

By the time he introduced the slogan of Demokratizatsiya, Gorbachev had concluded that implementing his reforms outlined at the Twenty-Seventh Party Congress in February 1986 required more than discrediting the "Old Guard". He changed his strategy from trying to work through the CPSU as it existed and instead embraced a degree of political liberalisation. In January 1987, he appealed over the heads of the party to the people and called for democratisation.

By the time of the Twenty-Eighth Party Congress in July 1990, it was clear that Gorbachev's reforms came with sweeping, unintended consequences, as nationalities of the constituent republics of the Soviet Union pulled harder than ever to break away from the Union and ultimately dismantle the Communist Party.

== Gorbachev's reform dilemma ==
Gorbachev increasingly found himself caught between criticism by conservatives who wanted to stop reform and liberals who wanted to accelerate it. Meanwhile, despite his intention to maintain a one-party system, the elements of a multiparty system already were crystallising.

=== 19th Party Conference ===
Despite some setbacks, he continued his policy of Demokratizatsiya, and he enjoyed his worldwide perception as the reformer. In June 1988, at the CPSU's 19th Party Conference, the first held since 1941, Gorbachev and his supporters launched radical reforms meant to reduce party control of the government apparatus. He again called for multicandidate elections for regional and local legislatures and party first secretaries and insisted on the separation of the government apparatus from party bodies at the regional level as well. In the face of an overwhelming majority of conservatives, Gorbachev still was able to rely on party obedience to the higher authorities to force through acceptance of his reform proposals. Experts called the conference a successful step in promoting party-directed change from above.

=== Changes in government ===
At an unprecedented emergency Central Committee plenum called by Gorbachev in September 1988, three stalwart old-guard members left the Politburo or lost positions of power. Andrei Gromyko retired (had decided to retire before the meeting) from the Politburo, Yegor Ligachev was relieved of the ideology portfolio within the Politburo's Secretariat, and Boris Pugo replaced Politburo member Mikhail Solomentsev as chairman of the powerful CPSU Party Control Committee. The Supreme Soviet then elected Gorbachev chairman of the Presidium of the Supreme Soviet, giving Gorbachev the attributes of power that previously Leonid Brezhnev had. These changes meant that the Secretariat, until that time solely responsible for the development and implementation of state policies, had lost much of its power.

==== Congress of People's Deputies ====
Meaningful changes also occurred in governmental structures. In December 1988, the Supreme Soviet of the Soviet Union approved formation of the Congress of People's Deputies of the Soviet Union, which constitutional amendments had established as the Soviet Union's new legislative body. The Supreme Soviet then dissolved itself. The amendments called for a smaller working body of 542 members, also called the Supreme Soviet, to be elected from the 2,250-member Congress of People's Deputies. To ensure a Communist majority in the new parliament, Gorbachev reserved one-third of the seats for the CPSU and other public organisations.

The March 1989 election of the Congress of People's Deputies marked the first time that voters of the Soviet Union ever chose the membership of a national legislative body. The results of the election stunned the ruling elite. Throughout the country, voters crossed off the ballot unopposed Communist candidates, many of them prominent party officials, taking advantage of the nominal privilege of withholding approval of the listed candidates. However, the Congress of People's Deputies that emerged still contained 87 percent CPSU members. Genuine reformists won only some 300 seats.

In May the initial session of the Congress of People's Deputies electrified the country. For two weeks on live television, deputies from around the country railed against every scandal and shortcoming of the Soviet system that could be identified. Speakers spared neither Gorbachev, the KGB, nor the military. Nevertheless, a conservative majority maintained control of the congress. Gorbachev was elected without opposition to the chairmanship of the new Supreme Soviet; then the Congress of People's Deputies elected a large majority of old-style party apparatchiks to fill the membership of its new legislative body. Outspoken opposition leader Boris Yeltsin obtained a seat in the Supreme Soviet only when another deputy relinquished his position. The first Congress of People's Deputies was the last moment of real control for Gorbachev over the political life of the Soviet Union.

==== Inter-Regional Group ====
In the summer of 1989, the first opposition bloc in the Congress of People's Deputies formed under the name of the Inter-Regional Group. The members of this body included almost all of the liberal and Russian nationalist members of the opposition led by Yeltsin.

A primary issue for the opposition was the repeal of Article 6 of the constitution, which prescribed the supremacy of the CPSU over all the institutions in society. Faced with opposition pressure for the repeal of Article 6 and needing allies against hard-liners in the CPSU, Gorbachev obtained the repeal of Article 6 by the February 1990 Central Committee plenum. Later that month, before the Supreme Soviet, he proposed the creation of a new office of president of the Soviet Union, for himself to be elected by the Congress of People's Deputies rather than the popular elections. Accordingly, in March 1990 Gorbachev was elected for the third time in eighteen months to a position equivalent to Soviet head of state. Former first deputy chairman of the Supreme Soviet Anatoly Lukyanov became chairman of the Supreme Soviet. The Supreme Soviet became similar to Western parliaments. Its debates were televised daily.

By the time of the Twenty-Eighth Party Congress in July 1990, the CPSU was regarded by liberals and nationalists of the constituent republics as anachronistic and unable to lead the country. The CPSU branches in many of the fifteen Soviet republics began to split into large pro-sovereignty and pro-union factions, further weakening central party control.

In a series of humiliations, the CPSU had been separated from the government and stripped of its leading role in society and its function in overseeing the national economy. However, the majority of its apparatchiks were successful in obtaining leading positions in the newly formed democratic institutions. For seventy years, the CPSU had been the cohesive force that kept the union together; without the authority of the party in the Soviet center, the nationalities of the constituent republics pulled harder than ever to break away from the union and to dismantle the party itself.

== See also ==
- Glasnost
- Perestroika
- Uskorenie
- History of the Soviet Union (1982–1991)
- Revolutions of 1989
- Democracy in Europe
