= Uskorenie =

Attempt to accelerate economic and scientific development in the Gorbachev-era USSR

Uskorenie (Russian: ускорение, IPA: [ʊskɐˈrʲenʲɪɪ̯ə]; literally meaning acceleration) was a slogan and a policy announced by Communist Party General Secretary Mikhail Gorbachev on 20 April 1985 at a Soviet Party Plenum, aimed at the acceleration of political, social and economic development of the Soviet Union. It was the first slogan of a set of reforms that also included perestroika (restructuring), glasnost (transparency), new political thinking, and demokratizatsiya (democratization).

== History ==
The idea of the acceleration of the economic development (and some other ideas implemented by Gorbachev during the perestroika times) was put forth already in 1982 by Yuri Andropov; it was declared in the lead article of Pravda by 2 January 1983 reporting on the 28 November 1982 Party Central Committee Plenary Session.

In May 1985, Gorbachev delivered a speech in Leningrad (now Saint Petersburg), during which he admitted the slowing down of the economic development and inadequacy of living standards.

The program was furthered at the 27th Congress of the Communist Party in Gorbachev's report to the congress, in which he spoke about perestroika, uskorenie, the "human factor", glasnost, and the "expansion of the khozraschet" (commercialization). The acceleration was planned to be based on technical and scientific progress, revamping of heavy industry (in accordance with the Marxian economics postulate about the primacy in development of heavy industry over light industry), taking the "human factor" into account, and increasing the labour discipline and responsibility of apparatchiks. In practice it was implemented with the help of massive monetary emission infused into heavy industry, which further destabilised the economy and in particular brought an enormous disparity between actual cash money and virtual money used in cashless clearings (Russian: безналичный расчёт, romanized: beznalichnyi raschet) between enterprises and state and among enterprises.

The politics of mere "acceleration" eventually failed, which was de facto admitted at the June 1987 Party Plenum, and the uskorenie slogan was phased out in favor of the more ambitious perestroika (restructuring of the whole economy).

== See also ==
- 500 Days
- Dissolution of the Soviet Union
- Transition economy
