= Perestroika in Kazakhstan =

Perestroika in Kazakhstan were the set of sweeping changes in the economic and political structures in the Kazakh Soviet Socialist Republic as part of the broader perestroika movement in the Soviet Union initiated by General Secretary Mikhail Gorbachev during the late 1980s. Ultimately, perestroika led to the loss of centralized control, an economic crisis, the dissolution of the Soviet Union, and Kazakhstan’s path to independence.

Opinions on the outcomes of perestroika vary widely. The reforms only partially met their goals: society became more democratic (although not fully), openness (glasnost) was introduced, censorship was lifted, private enterprise was legalized, and there was a mutual repair in relations with the West. However, the Soviet economy entered a decline, and politically, perestroika culminated in the end of the CPSU’s iron grip and the total dissolution of the USSR. On the international stage, the Soviet Union completely lost its influence on the communist world stage and effectively suffered a defeat in the Cold War, paving the way for neoliberalism to emerge victorious.

== The December Events ==
In December 1986, Dinmukhamed Kunaev, an ethnic Kazakh, was dismissed from his position as First Secretary of the Central Committee of the Communist Party of Kazakhstan, and replaced by Gennady Kolbin, a Russian with no connection to Kazakhstan. This was ordered by Gorbachev to weaken potential opposition from the non-Russian SSRs. This led to discontent and aggressive riots breaking out in Almaty. Young Kazakhs, protesting Kolbin’s appointment, were met with force. Known as the December Events, or Jeltoqsan (Kazakh: Желтоқсан - December), these demonstrations, held on December 17–18, 1986, in Almaty, the then-capital of the Kazakh SSR, escalated into mass protests and uprisings against the communist authorities. Official accounts attribute the unrest to General Secretary Gorbachev’s decision to replace Kunaev with Kolbin, who had never worked in Kazakhstan. Participants in the peaceful rally demanded that the head of the republic be a representative of the native population. The unrest among Kazakh youth soon spread to other cities and regions across Kazakhstan. The clashes would turn violent, with many protestors being persecuted, arrested, tortured or killed.

The December events in Kazakhstan marked one of the first large-scale protests in the USSR against central authority, foreshadowing similar events in other Soviet republics and Eastern Bloc states. The underlying causes of the conflict were the growing economic struggles of the Soviet system exacerbated by Gorbachev’s failed policies, rising nationalist sentiments, political repression of new ideas and perceived Russification.

In his memoirs, Mikhail Gorbachev later acknowledged the mistake of appointing Kolbin in Kazakhstan:

We needed to correct the mistake we made with Kolbin. It was our first major misstep in interethnic relations, and I was determined not to repeat it. We all agreed that Kazakhs should govern their republic and gave them the right to decide who would become their new leader.

== Appointment of Local Leadership ==
Several candidates were considered for the position of First Secretary of the Central Committee of the Communist Party of Kazakhstan, and on June 22, 1989, Nursultan Nazarbayev was chosen. Within the ranks of the CPSU’s leadership, there were opponents to Nazarbayev’s appointment who argued that “Nazarbayev is difficult” as he could defy orders and ultimately turn uncontrollable. Gorbachev countered with a single remark: “Better one difficult Nazarbayev than a difficult Kazakhstan.” Ultimately, Nazarbayev’s candidacy was approved in a closed, secret ballot with 154 out of 158 Central Committee members in favor.

During the plenary following his election, Nazarbayev shared his views on the policies of perestroika:

I fully understand the responsibility placed on the Communist Party of Kazakhstan and myself at such a pivotal moment in our party’s and republic’s history.

People associate perestroika with the hope of solving many vital socio-economic and political issues, including those in interethnic relations, which were either suppressed or ignored during the years of stagnation. The complexity of these issues has become evident from recent events. However, approaches to their resolution have now been defined, and we must move forward actively to implement them.

My stance on these issues is well-known to all of you. I clearly expressed it in my speech at the First Congress of People’s Deputies of the USSR. I sought to represent the interests of the Kazakh people, and this became a shared platform for the delegation from our republic. I assure you that I will firmly pursue this program’s implementation. I believe that for the leader of our republic, the people’s interests must come above all.

== Path to Independence ==
The Soviet Union’s economic policies led to numerous protests demanding improvements in the economic situation for the people. A miners’ strike that began in the coal centers of Donbas and Kuzbass soon spread to Karaganda. Nursultan Nazarbayev and the USSR Minister of Coal Industry, Mikhail Shchadov, flew to Karaganda to meet with the miners. In the end, the miners accepted Nazarbayev’s arguments and agreed to a one-year moratorium on strikes to allow time for economic stabilization.

At the Third Congress of People’s Deputies, while discussing the establishment of the position of President of the USSR, Nazarbayev declared that the Supreme Soviet of Kazakhstan retained the right to proclaim the territory’s land, natural resources, waters, forests, and minerals as the republic’s property. However, he cautioned that his statement should not be taken as an ultimatum.

Diplomat and politician Alexander Dzasokhov later recounted that in the autumn of 1990, Gorbachev asked him to travel to Almaty and secure Nazarbayev’s agreement to take the position of Vice President of the USSR. Gorbachev “justified his intention by expressing a desire to have Nazarbayev at his side. Gorbachev saw the introduction of the Vice Presidency as one of the key steps in strengthening the state administration system. The main argument for Nursultan Nazarbayev’s candidacy was his successful experience in governing a vast republic, combined with his deep understanding of economic and political realities. Equally important was Nazarbayev’s insight into the nature of our multinational state.” Gorbachev later recalled that he envisioned Nazarbayev taking the role of head of government in a renewed Union, but these plans were abandoned after the chaotic August 1991 coup attempt hatched by Soviet hardliners.

On October 25, 1990, the Kazakh SSR declared sovereignty over its territory as a republic within the USSR. Following the failed coup attempt in Moscow in August 1991, the Kazakh SSR officially changed its name to the Republic of Kazakhstan on December 10, and on December 16, 1991, Kazakhstan declared its independence, becoming the last Soviet republic to do so. This fact remains popular in alternate history videos and memes to this day. Nine days later, the Soviet Union itself ceased to exist.
