= Khozraschet =

Principle of profitability and accountability in Soviet economic planning

Khozraschyot (Note: Also transliterated Khozraschet (common transliteration due to the omission of the diacritics over 'ё' in older Russian sources), Khozraschot, or Khozraschiot) (Russian: хозрасчёт, IPA: [ˌxozrɐˈɕːɵt]; short for хозяйственный расчёт khoziaistvennyi raschyot, 'economic accounting') was an attempt to introduce capitalist concepts of profit and profit center into the planned economy of the Soviet Union. Khozraschyot introduced a certain degree of independence of enterprises (which continued to be state-owned and subject to state control) and allowed for self-management and self-financing within the framework of prices set by the Soviet government.

== Meaning ==
The term has often been translated as cost accounting, a term more commonly used for management approaches in a free market economy. It has also been conflated with other concepts: self-financing, cost-effectiveness (самоокупаемость; samookupaemost), and self-management (самоуправление; samoupravlenie) introduced in state-owned enterprises in the 1980s.

As defined in the Soviet Encyclopedic Dictionary:

Khozraschyot is a method of the planned running of an economic unit (i.e., of a business, in Western terms) based on the confrontation of the expenses incurred in production with the production output, on the compensation of expenses with the income.

== History ==
Khozraschyot introduced the necessity of accountability and profitability, as well as motivation for economical expenditures. The concept was introduced during Lenin's New Economic Policy (NEP) period. However, the concept of "profitability" often favoured light industry over heavy industry, which was sometimes deemed to have "poor profitability." Since the development of heavy industry and capital goods was a priority for the rapid modernisation of the Soviet Union, by the end of the 1920s, the notion of economic profitability was subordinated to the requirements of an economic plan. This plan was heavily influenced by political decisions, with its "control figures" becoming obligatory targets within the framework of the Five-Year Plans.

The concept re-emerged during the 1965 Soviet economic reform ("Kosygin's reform") and was further emphasised in the late 1980s during perestroika, when it also included workers' self-management. A tentative step towards private activity occurred in 1986 with a law allowing private management of a few handicraft and service businesses, which involved unpaid and family labour, strict state controls, and high tax rates of 65% (later reduced in 1988).
