= Soviet Encyclopedic Dictionary =

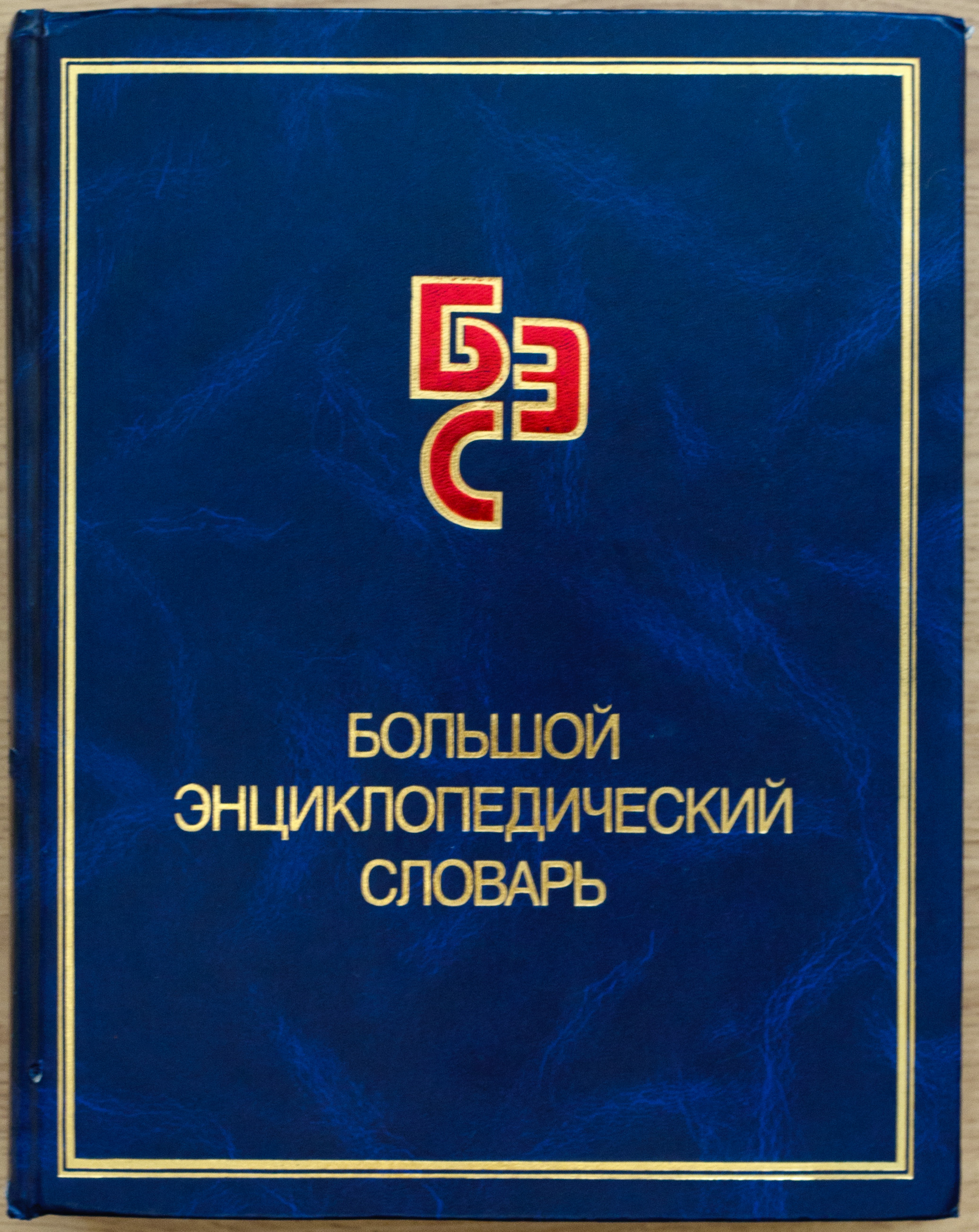
Great Encyclopedic Dictionary

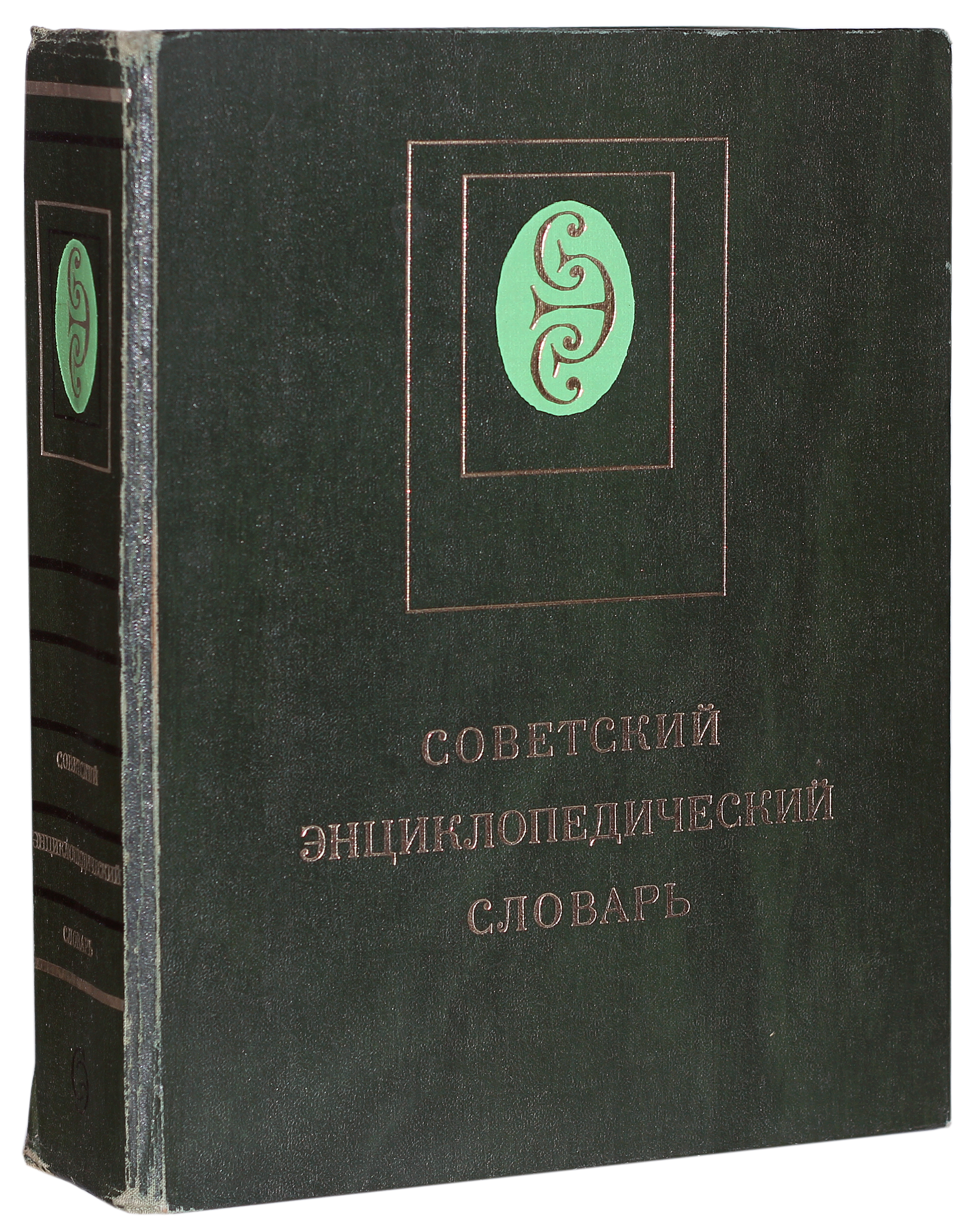
Soviet Encyclopedic Dictionary

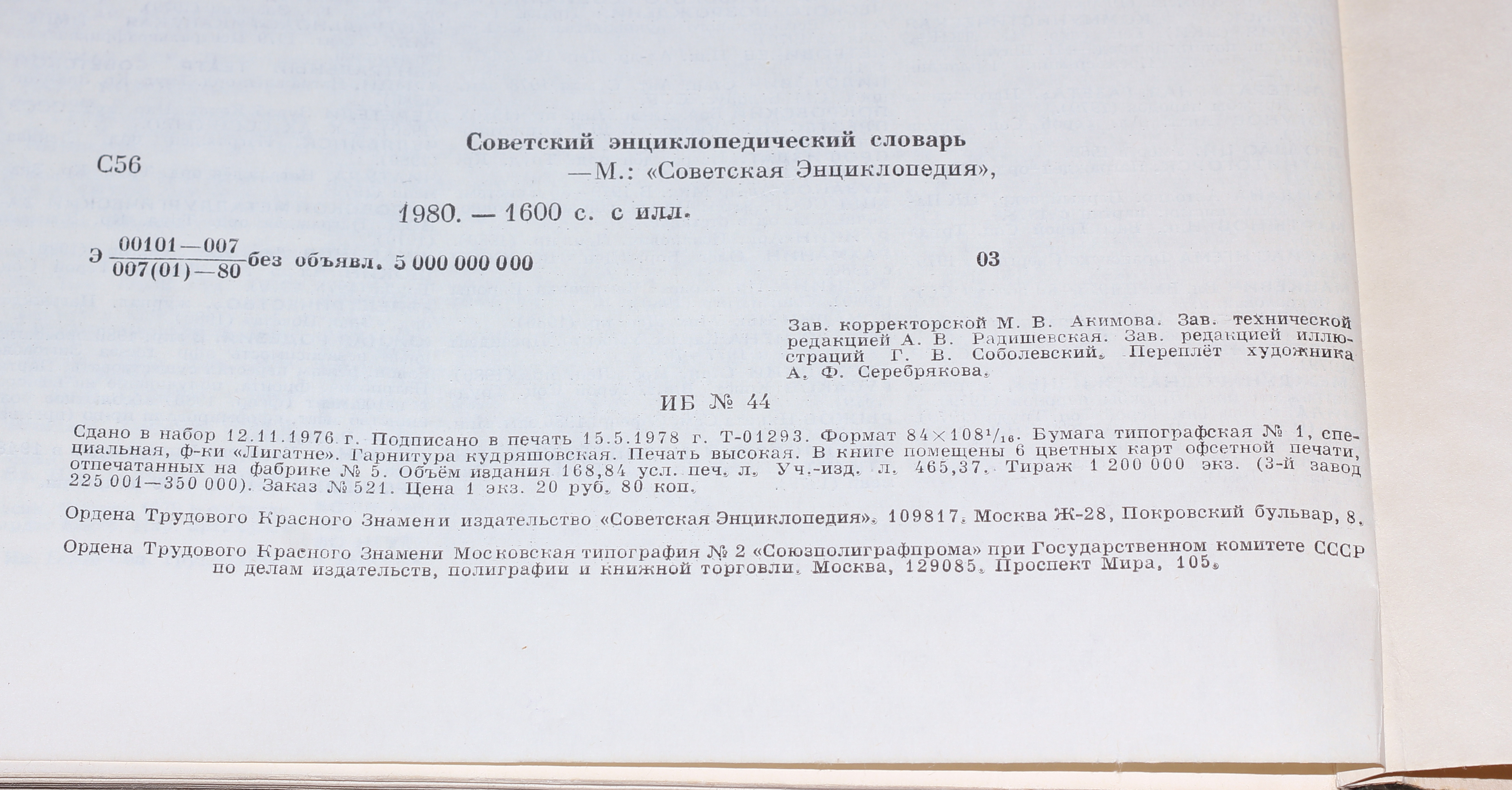
Data

Soviet Encyclopedic Dictionary (Russian: Советский Энциклопедический Словарь, СЭС) is an omnibus encyclopedic dictionary published by Sovetskaya Entsiklopediya (1st edition in 1979, 2nd in 1982, 3rd in 1984, 4th in 1986). The fourth edition (1,600 pages) contains about 80,000 entries, 550 black-and-white pictures and schemes and 350 maps.

After the dissolution of the Soviet Union it has been issued as the new product, Large Encyclopedic Dictionary (1991, 1997, 2002).
