= Perestroika =

Soviet political reform movement

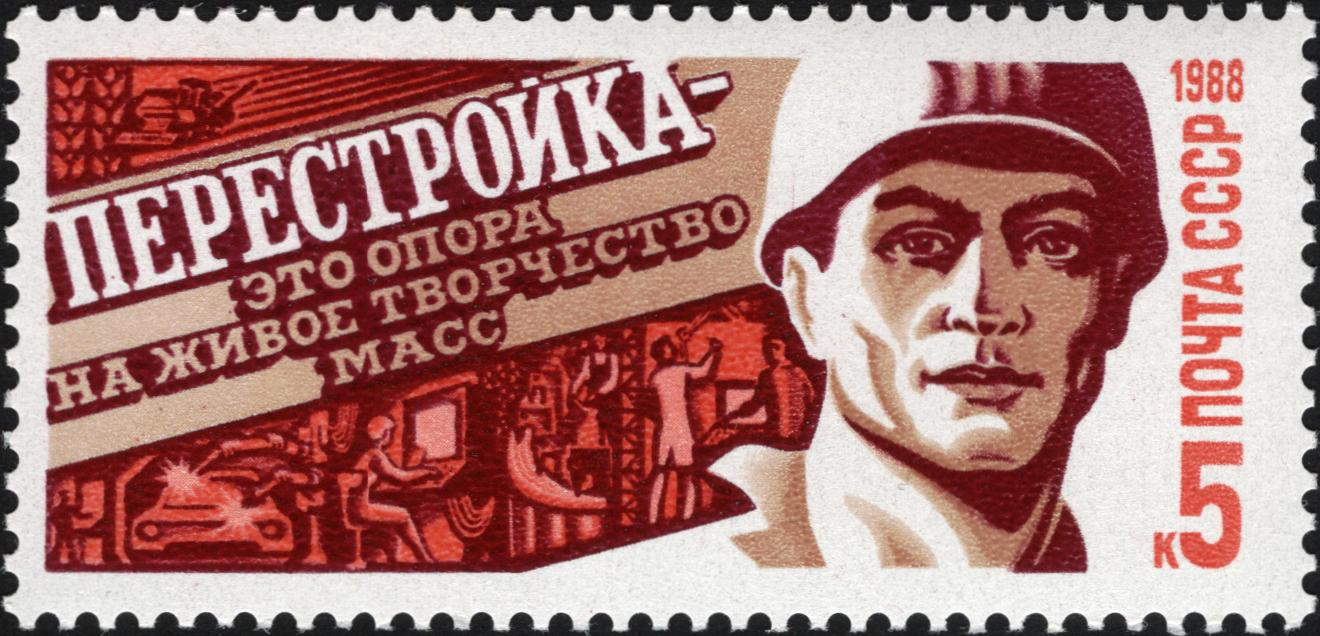
- 5 kopeck perestroika commemorative postage stamp, 1988
- Russian: перестройка
- Romanization: perestroyka
- IPA: [pʲɪrʲɪˈstrojkə]
- Literal meaning: reconstruction

Perestroika (/ˌpɛrəˈstrɔɪkə/ PERR-ə-STROY-kə; Russian: перестройка, romanized: perestroyka, IPA: [pʲɪrʲɪˈstrojkə]) was a political reform movement within the Communist Party of the Soviet Union (CPSU) during the late 1980s, widely associated with CPSU general secretary Mikhail Gorbachev and his glasnost ("transparency") policy reform. Perestroika literally means "restructuring", referring to the restructuring of the political economy of the Soviet Union in an attempt to end the Era of Stagnation. (Note: Non-fans sometimes follow Alexander Zinoviev in referring to perestroika disparagingly as "catastroika" (Russian: катастройка, romanized: katastroika).) The term was coined by Soviet economist and sociologist Tatyana Zaslavskaya.

Perestroika allowed more independent actions from various ministries and introduced many market-like reforms. The purported goal of perestroika was not to end the planned economy, but rather to make socialism work more efficiently to better meet the needs of Soviet citizens by adopting elements of liberal economics. The process of implementing perestroika added to existing shortages and created political, social, and economic tensions within the Soviet Union. Furthermore, it is often blamed for the political rise of nationalism and nationalist political parties in the constituent republics of the USSR.

The motivation for perestroika stemmed from a combination of entrenched economic stagnation, political sclerosis, and growing social dissatisfaction that had taken root in the early 1980s. These conditions compelled Gorbachev and his allies to initiate broad reforms to save the system from collapse.

Gorbachev first used the term perestroika in a speech on December 10, 1984, and began implementing his reforms three months later, upon coming to power. The era of perestroika lasted from 1985 until 1991, and is often argued to be a significant cause of the collapse of the Eastern Bloc and the dissolution of the Soviet Union.

Russian-British sociologist Mikhail Anipkin views perestroika as a revolution of quadragenarians. In his 2024 book, Party Worker: The Rise of a Soviet Regional Leader, Anipkin argues that perestroika was desperately sought by the younger generation of Party functionaries, and that Mikhail Gorbachev sensed that demand. Anipkin draws his arguments from the political biography of his own father, Alexander Anipkin, a high-ranking Party apparatchik, who enthusiastically accepted perestroika and sought to further democracy within the Party.

With respect to foreign policy, Gorbachev promoted "new political thinking": de-ideologization of international politics, abandoning the concept of class struggle, prioritizing universal human interests over the interests of any class, increasing interdependence of the world, and promoting mutual security based on political rather than on military instruments. This doctrine represented a significant shift from the previous principles of Soviet foreign relations. Its implementation marked the end of the Cold War.

== Political reforms ==
Gorbachev had concluded that implementing his reforms outlined at the Twenty-Seventh Party Congress in February 1986 required more than discrediting the "Old Guard", those with a Marxist-Leninist political orientation. He changed his strategy from trying to work through the CPSU as it existed to embracing a degree of political liberalization. In January 1987, he appealed over the heads of the party to the people and called for democratization. Earlier members of local soviets were appointed by local Communist Party branches; now they were to be elected by the people from among various candidates.

The March 1989 election of the Congress of People's Deputies of the Soviet Union marked the first time that voters of the Soviet Union ever chose the membership of a national legislative body. The election results stunned the ruling elite. Throughout the country, voters crossed unopposed Communist candidates off the ballot, many of them prominent party officials, taking advantage of the nominal privilege of withholding approval of the listed candidates.

By the time of the Twenty-Eighth Party Congress in July 1990, it was clear that Gorbachev's reforms came with sweeping, unintended consequences, as nationalities of the constituent republics of the Soviet Union pulled harder than ever to break away from the Union and ultimately dismantle the Communist Party.

== Economic reforms ==
In May 1985, Mikhail Gorbachev gave a speech in Leningrad in which he admitted the slowing of economic development and inadequate living standards.

The program was furthered at the 27th Congress of the Communist Party in Gorbachev's report to the congress, in which he spoke about "perestroika", "uskoreniye" (acceleration), "human factor", "glasnost" (transparency), and "expansion of the khozraschyot" (accounting).

During the initial period (1985–1987) of Mikhail Gorbachev's time in power, he talked about modifying central planning but did not make any truly fundamental changes (uskoreniye; "acceleration"). Gorbachev and his team of economic advisors then introduced more fundamental reforms, which became known as perestroika (restructuring).

At the June 1987 plenary session of the Central Committee of the Communist Party of the Soviet Union, Gorbachev presented his "basic theses", which laid the political foundation for economic reform for the remainder of the Soviet Union's existence.

In July 1987, the Supreme Soviet of the Soviet Union passed the Law on State Enterprise. The law stipulated that state enterprises were free to determine output levels based on demand from consumers and other enterprises. Enterprises had to fulfil state orders, but they could dispose of the remaining output as they saw fit. However, the state still retained control over the means of production for these enterprises, thus limiting their ability to implement full-cost accountability. Enterprises bought input from suppliers at negotiated contract prices. Under the law, enterprises became self-financing; that is, they had to cover expenses (wages, taxes, supplies, and debt service) through revenues. Finally, the law shifted control over the enterprise operations from ministries to elected workers' collectives. Gosplan's responsibilities were to supply general guidelines and national investment priorities.

The Law on Cooperatives, enacted in May 1988, was perhaps the most radical of the economic reforms during the early part of the Gorbachev era. For the first time since Vladimir Lenin's New Economic Policy was abolished in 1928, the law permitted private ownership of businesses in the services, manufacturing, and foreign-trade sectors. The law initially imposed high taxes and employment restrictions, but it later revised these to avoid discouraging private-sector activity. Under this provision, cooperative restaurants, shops, and manufacturers became part of the Soviet scene.

Alexander Yakovlev was considered to be the intellectual force behind Gorbachev's reform program of glasnost and perestroika. In the summer of 1985, Yakovlev became head of the propaganda department of the CPSU Central Committee. He argued in favor of the reform programs and played a key role in implementing them.

After the XX Congress, in an ultra-narrow circle of our closest friends and associates, we often discussed the problems of democratization of the country and society. We chose a simple – like a sledgehammer – method of propagating the "ideas" of late Lenin. A group of true, not imaginary reformers developed (of course, orally) the following plan: to strike with the authority of Lenin at Stalin, at Stalinism. And then, if successful, – to strike with Plekhanov and Social Democracy – at Lenin, and then – with liberalism and "moral socialism" – at revolutionarism in general .... The Soviet totalitarian regime could be destroyed only through glasnost and totalitarian party discipline, while hiding behind the interests of improving socialism. [...] Looking back, I can proudly say that a clever, but very simple tactic – the mechanisms of totalitarianism against the system of totalitarianism – has worked.

— Yakovlev, as quoted in the introduction to Black Book of Communism

The most significant of Gorbachev's reforms in the foreign economic sector allowed foreign investors to invest in the Soviet Union through joint ventures with Soviet ministries, state enterprises, and cooperatives. The original version of the Soviet Joint Venture Law, which took effect in June 1987, limited foreign shareholdings in a Soviet venture to 49 percent and required that Soviet citizens hold the positions of chairman and general manager. After potential Western partners complained, the government revised the regulations to allow majority foreign ownership and control. Under the terms of the Joint Venture Law, the Soviet partner supplied labor, infrastructure, and a potentially large domestic market. The foreign partner supplied capital, technology, entrepreneurial expertise, and in many cases, products and services of world-competitive quality.

Gorbachev's economic reforms did little to improve the country's sluggish economy in the late 1980s. The reforms decentralized things to some extent, although price controls remained, as did the ruble's inconvertibility and most government controls over the means of production.

== Comparison with China ==
Perestroika and Deng Xiaoping's reform and opening up have similar origins but very different effects on their respective countries' economies. Both efforts occurred in large socialist countries attempting to liberalize their economies, but while China's GDP has grown consistently since the late 1980s (albeit from a much lower level), national GDP in the USSR and in many of its successor states fell precipitously throughout the 1990s, a period often referred to as the wild nineties. Gorbachev's reforms were gradualist and maintained many of the macroeconomic aspects of the planned economy (including price controls, inconvertibility of the ruble, exclusion of private property ownership, and the government monopoly over most means of production).

Reform was largely focused on industry and cooperatives, with a limited role given to the development of foreign investment and international trade. Factory managers were expected to meet state demands for goods, but to find their own funding. Perestroika reforms went far enough to create new bottlenecks in the Soviet economy but arguably did not go far enough to streamline it effectively.

Reform and opening up were, by contrast, a bottom-up attempt at reform, focusing on light industry and agriculture (namely, allowing peasants to sell produce grown on private holdings at market prices). Economic reforms were fostered through the development of "Special Economic Zones", designed for export and to attract foreign investment, municipally managed Township and Village Enterprises and a "dual pricing" system leading to the steady phasing out of state-dictated prices. Greater latitude was given to managers of state-owned factories, while capital was made available to them through a reformed banking system and through fiscal policies (in contrast to the fiscal anarchy and fall in revenue experienced by the Soviet government during perestroika). Perestroika was expected to lead to results such as market pricing and privately sold produce, but the Union dissolved before advanced stages were reached.

Another fundamental difference is that where perestroika was accompanied by greater political freedoms under Gorbachev's glasnost policies, reform and opening up has been accompanied by continued authoritarian rule and a suppression of political dissidents, most notably at Tiananmen Square. Gorbachev acknowledged this difference but maintained that it was unavoidable and that perestroika would have been doomed to defeat and revanchism by the nomenklatura without glasnost, because conditions in the Soviet Union were not identical to those in China. Gorbachev cited a line from a 1986 newspaper article that he felt encapsulated this reality: "The apparatus broke Khrushchev's neck and the same thing will happen now." In this regard, the tumultuous Cultural Revolution may have actually aided Deng, as the chaos of the period removed many of the economic planners who could have sabotaged his reform efforts as the Soviet economic planners would later do with Gorbachev's reforms.

Another difference is that the Soviet Union faced strong secession threats from its ethnic regions and a primacy challenge by the RSFSR. Gorbachev's extension of regional autonomy eased the suppression of existing ethnic-regional tensions, while Deng's reforms did nothing to alter the tight grip of the central government on any of China's autonomous regions. The Soviet Union's dual nature, federal as a state yet unitary as a party, played a part in the difficulty of controlling the pace of restructuring, especially once the new Russian Communist Party was formed and posed a challenge to the primacy of the CPSU. Gorbachev described this process as a "parade of sovereignties" and identified it as the factor that most undermined the gradualism of restructuring and the preservation of the Soviet Union. This contrasted with China, where both the party and state were unitary, establishing a clear link between the two at each level of government and discouraging the formation of any independent power center.

== Perestroika and glasnost ==
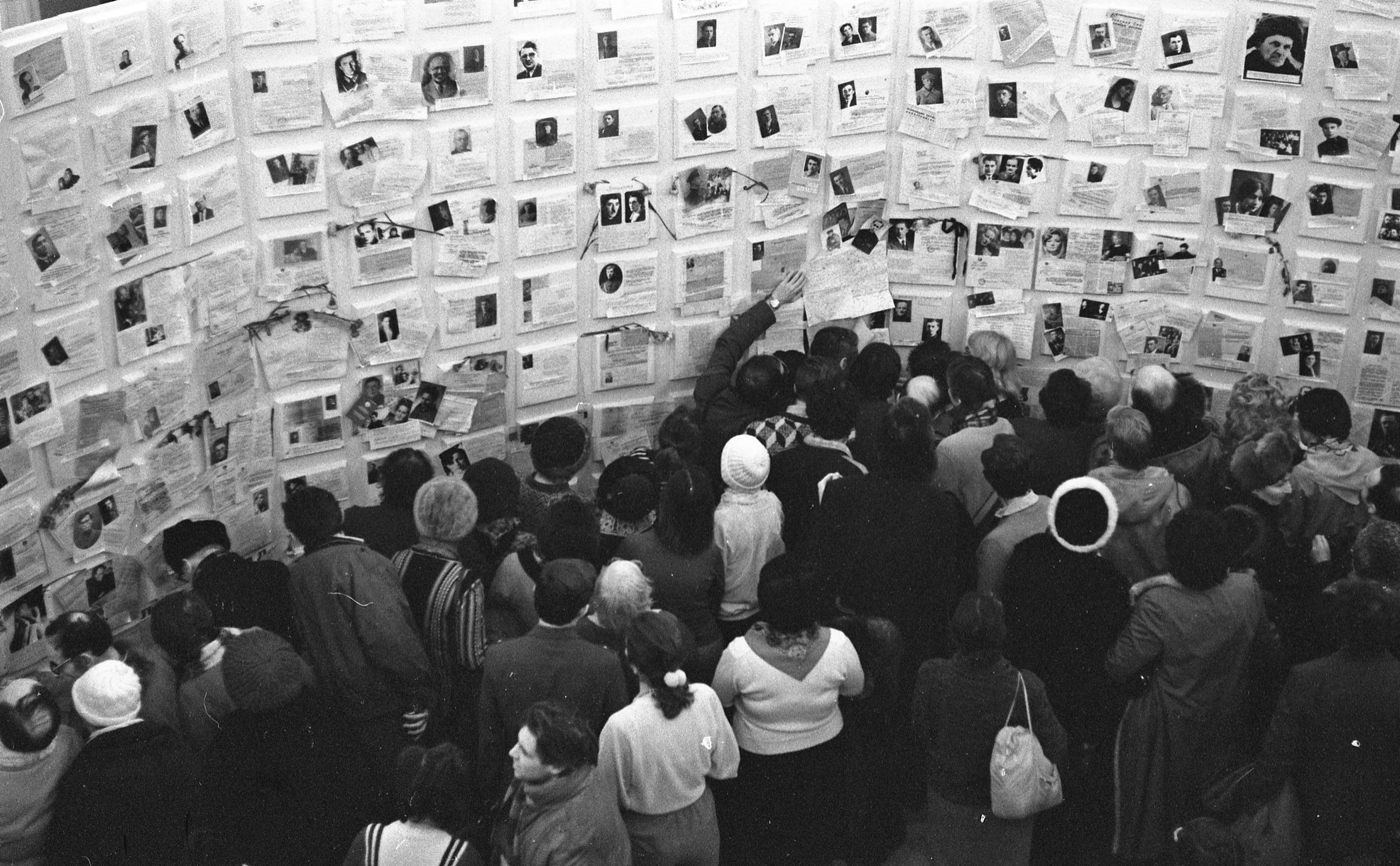
"Wall of Sorrow" at the first exhibition of the victims of Stalinism in Moscow, 19 November 1988

One of the final important measures taken on the continuation of the movement was a report from the central committee meeting of the CPSU titled "On Reorganization and the Party's Personnel Policy". Gorbachev emphasized the need of a faster political personnel turnover and of a policy of democratization that opened the political elections to multiple candidates and to non-party members.

This report was in such high demand in Prague and Berlin that many people could not get a copy. One effect was an abrupt demand for Russian dictionaries to understand the content of Gorbachev's report.

In an interview with Mieczyslaw Rakowski, he states the success of perestroika was impossible without glasnost.

Despite early enthusiasm, the reforms of perestroika and glasnost ultimately failed to deliver lasting improvements. By the late 1980s, the Soviet Union faced a deepening economic crisis, with widespread shortages and deficits. Gorbachev's leadership lost credibility as the public saw little tangible progress. Scholars argue that he and his advisors underestimated the severity of the crisis and the political risks of decentralization. Without a clear strategy and amid rising public disillusionment, these reforms contributed to growing instability and the eventual collapse of the Soviet Union.

== The role of the West in Perestroika ==
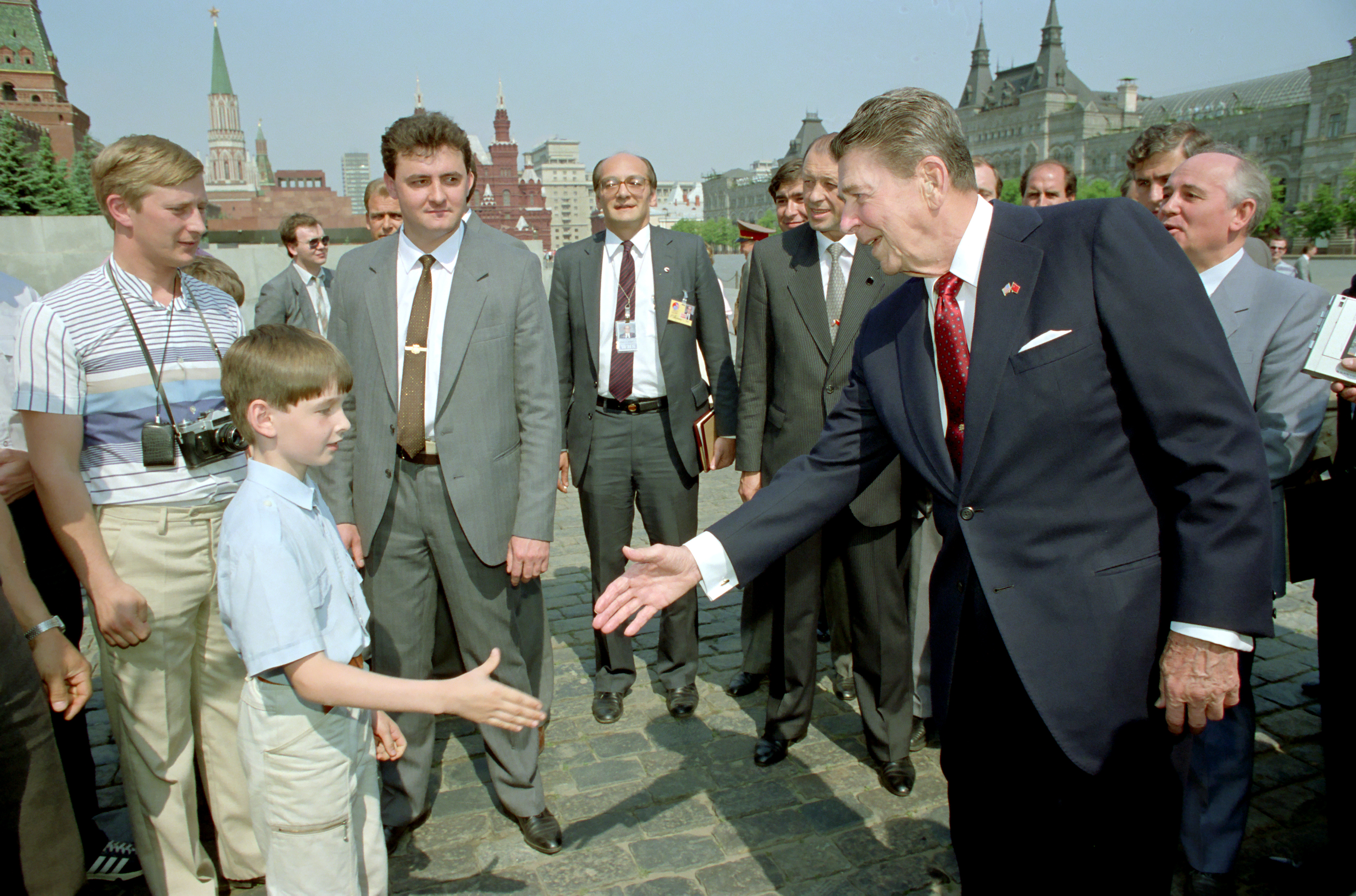
A young boy and Ronald Reagan in Red Square, Moscow, 1988

During the 1980s and 1990s, the United States President George H. W. Bush pledged solidarity with Gorbachev, but never brought his administration to support Gorbachev's reforms. In fact, "no bailout for Gorbachev" was a consistent policy line of the Bush administration, further demonstrating the lack of true support from the West. President Bush had a financial policy to aid perestroika that was shaped by a minimalist approach, foreign-policy convictions that set Bush apart from other U.S. leaders, and a frugal attitude, all of which influenced his unwillingness to aid Gorbachev. Other factors influenced the West's lack of aid, for example, the "in-house Gorbi-skeptics" advocacy, the expert community's consensus about the undesirability of rushing U.S. aid to Gorbachev, strong opposition to any bailout at many levels, including foreign-policy conservatives, the U.S. Congress, and the American public at large. The West seemed to miss an opportunity to gain significant influence over the Soviet government. The Soviets aided the expansion of Western capitalism by allowing an inflow of Western investment, but the "perestroika" managers ultimately failed. President Bush had the opportunity to aid the Soviet Union in ways that would bring the governments closer together, as Harry S. Truman did for many nations in Western Europe.

Early on, as perestroika was getting underway, I felt like the West might come along and find it a sensible thing to do—easing Russia's difficult transition from totalitarianism to democracy. What I had in mind in the first place, was the participation [of the West] in the conversion of defense industries, the modernization of light and food industries, and Russia's inclusion on an equal-member footing in the frameworks of the international economic relations; ... [U]nlike some democrats, I did not expect "manna from Heaven", but counted on the Western statesmen to use their common sense.

President George H. W. Bush continued to dodge helping the Russians and the President of Czechoslovakia, Václav Havel, laid bare the linkage for the Americans in his address to a joint session of Congress on 21 February 1990:

... I often hear the question: How can the United States of America help us today? My reply is as paradoxical as the whole of my life has been: You can help us most of all if you help the Soviet Union on its irreversible, but immensely complicated road to democracy. ... [T]he sooner, the more quickly, and the more peacefully the Soviet Union begins to move along the road toward genuine political pluralism, respect for the rights of nations to their own integrity and to a working—that is a market—economy, the better it will be, not just for Czechs and Slovaks, but for the whole world.

When the United States needed help with Germany's reunification, Gorbachev proved instrumental in finding solutions to the "German problem", and Bush acknowledged that "Gorbachev was moving the USSR in the right direction". Bush, in his own words, even gave praise to Gorbachev "to salute the man" in acknowledgment of the Soviet leader's role as "the architect of perestroika ... [who had] conducted the affairs of the Soviet Union with great restraint as Poland and Czechoslovakia and GDR ... and other countries [that had] achieved their independence", and who was "under extraordinary pressure at home, particularly on the economy".

== See also ==
- History of the Soviet Union (1982–1991)
- Perestroika in Kazakhstan
- Corrective Movement program (Syria)
- Infiraj
- Infitah

== Notes ==
Preceded by Brezhnev stagnation	History of Russia; History of the Soviet Union; 10 March 1985 – 25 December 1991	Succeeded by Dissolution of the USSR; In Russia: Yeltsinism
