= Sinatra Doctrine =

Joke slogan describing the loosening of relations between the USSR and satellite states

The Sinatra Doctrine was a Soviet foreign policy under Mikhail Gorbachev for allowing member states of the Warsaw Pact to determine their own domestic affairs. The name humorously alluded to the song "My Way" popularized by Frank Sinatra—the Soviet Union was allowing these states to go their own way. Its implementation was part of Gorbachev's doctrine of new political thinking.

== History ==
The Sinatra Doctrine was a significant break from the earlier Brezhnev Doctrine, under which Moscow tightly controlled the internal affairs of satellite states. This had been used to justify the crushing of the Hungarian Revolution of 1956 and the Warsaw Pact invasion of Czechoslovakia in 1968, as well as the invasion of the non-Warsaw Pact nation of Afghanistan in 1979. By the late 1980s, structural flaws within the Soviet system, growing economic problems, the rise of anti-communist sentiment, and the effects of the Soviet–Afghan War made it increasingly impractical for the Soviet Union to impose its will on its neighbors.

The phrase was coined on 25 October 1989 by Foreign Ministry spokesman Gennadi Gerasimov. He was speaking to reporters in Helsinki about a speech made two days earlier by Soviet Foreign Minister Eduard Shevardnadze. The latter had said that the Soviets recognized the freedom of choice of all countries, specifically including the other Warsaw Pact states. Gerasimov told the interviewer, "We now have the Frank Sinatra doctrine. He has a song, 'I Did It My Way'. So every country decides on its own which road to take." When asked whether this would include Moscow accepting the rejection of communist parties in the Soviet bloc, he replied: "That's for sure ... political structures must be decided by the people who live there."

The Sinatra Doctrine has been seen as Moscow permitting its allies to decide their futures. It was a retrospective policy, as Soviet allies had already acquired much greater freedom of action. A month before Gerasimov's statement, Poland had elected its first non-communist government since the 1940s. The Hungarian government began dismantling the Iron Curtain on the border with Austria in the spring of 1989. From the Pan-European Picnic in August, it was clear to the media-informed Eastern European population that, on the one hand, the Soviet Union would not prevent the opening of the border. On the other hand, the Eastern European governments were divided. Since Hungary was one of the few countries East Germans could travel to, thousands then traveled there to flee to the West across the newly opened border. To the great annoyance of the East German government, the Hungarians refused to stop the exodus.

These developments greatly disturbed hardline communists such as the East German leader Erich Honecker, who condemned the end of the Soviet bloc's traditional "socialist unity" and appealed to Moscow to rein in the Hungarians. Honecker faced a growing crisis at home, with massive anti-government demonstrations in Leipzig and other East German cities. Shevardnadze's speech and Gerasimov's memorable description of the new policy contradicted Honecker's appeals.

The Sinatra Doctrine proclamation had dramatic effects across the Soviet bloc. The beleaguered East German government had hoped for a Soviet intervention to defend communism in East Germany and elsewhere. However, the Sinatra Doctrine announcement signaled that the Soviet Union would not aid the East German communists. In a few months, the communist governments of East Germany, Czechoslovakia, Bulgaria, and Romania had all been overthrown, thus bringing the Cold War to an end.

== See also ==
- Revolutions of 1989 ("Autumn of Nations")
- New political thinking
