= New political thinking =

1987–1990 USSR foreign policy philosophy

New political thinking (Russian: Новое политическое мышление), or simply new thinking (Russian: Новое мышление) (Note: Gorbachev was known to often put an incorrect stress in words. As a notable peculiarity, Gorbachev pronounced the term as "но́вое полити́ческое мы́шление", while the common Russian stress is мышле́ние (contrary to speculations, Gorbachev's version of stress was also attested in dictionaries, but as a less common)) was the doctrine put forth by Mikhail Gorbachev as part of his reforms of the Soviet Union. Its major elements were de-ideologization of international politics, abandoning the concept of class struggle, priority of universal human interests over the interests of any class, increasing interdependence of the world, and mutual security based on political rather than military instruments. The doctrine constituted a significant shift from the previous principles of Soviet foreign policy.

== History ==
In 1987, Gorbachev published the book Perestroika and New Political Thinking; in December 1988, he presented this doctrine of new thinking in his speech to the United Nations. The concept of "new thinking" was vital for the Soviet Union's attempt to end the costly competition of the Cold War in order for it to be able to continue the internal economic reforms of perestroika.

Notable attempts to do this included the Intermediate-Range Nuclear Forces Treaty, Soviet withdrawal from Afghanistan, and the end of Soviet support for communist movements around the world. Gorbachev also loosened the Soviet Union's grip over Eastern Europe by replacing the Brezhnev Doctrine with the Sinatra Doctrine.

In 1990, Gorbachev was awarded the Nobel Peace Prize "for his leading role in the peace process". The overall effect of these developments was the end of the Cold War, the breakdown of the Warsaw Pact, and ultimately the dissolution of the Soviet Union.
