= Artel =

Cooperative association in pre-Soviet Russia or the Soviet Union

An artel (Russian: арте́ль) was any of several types of cooperative associations of workers in pre-revolutionary Russia. In the Soviet Union, the term was applied to production cooperatives. They began centuries ago but were especially prevalent from the time of the emancipation of the Russian serfs (1861) through the 1950s. In the later Soviet period (1960s–1980s), the term was mostly phased out with the complete monopolization of the Soviet economy by the state.

Artels were semiformal associations for craft, artisan, and light industrial enterprises. Often artel members worked far from home and lived as a commune. Payment for a completed job was distributed according to verbal agreements, quite often in equal shares. Often artels were for seasonal industry; fishing, hunting, harvesting of crops, logging, and gathering of wild plants, berries, and mushrooms were prime examples of activities that were in many cases seasonal (although not invariably).

In a 1918 article on Russian education and social structures (as of the late period of the Russian Empire, just before the Soviet Union took shape), Manya Gordon described the artel as follows:

The Artel (association) is another term for the collective ownership and operation of industry. It is one of the oldest and most widespread institutions in Russia. The most ancient of these is the famous fishing Artel of the Cossacks of the Ural. This association had a membership of 15,000 to 20,000 men whose work was carried on under conditions of absolute equality. The fishing-waters, as well as the necessary equipment, were owned in common. The proceeds were divided equally among the members without regard to special skill or any other considerations. The association as a whole was divided up into groups, or minor Artels, of perhaps a score of workers. Each group had its "Elder" who supervised the work and looked after the accounts. The various branches had complete freedom of action, though they shared expenditures and profits.

The organization of the Artel was much simpler than that of the Mir [village collective]. There were no written agreements. Slacking was dealt with by admonition and in chronic cases by expulsion from the Artel. No admission fees were required. All that was required was the capacity and willingness to work. A rather disjointed organization, one would say. On the contrary, it was almost militaristic in the unquestioning obedience rendered to the Elder who was elected annually. Apart from the duties he owed to the Artel, every member was a free agent.

I have described the most powerful of the Artels. But this scheme of association was by no means restricted to the fishing industry. As a rule, small groups of men engaged in active labor organize themselves into an Artel. Although the various Artels prefer the communal mode of living, their general characteristics vary. Some associations, unlike the one I have described, do not own their equipment. In that case, by general agreement the wealthier members of the Artel, who supply the necessary implements, receive extra recompense for their property. Again, there is the Artel which is hired by an employer, or a person who supplies the capital. The Artel members share their earnings in common.

In the later portion of the era of artels, some formalized types of artels emerged, with internal hierarchy and legal agreements. By the 1960s, Soviet reality had mostly killed the original spirit of the artel institution, such that in Yuri Krotkov's 1967 memoir, the term artel is defined for English-language readers in a footnote as "a small workshop, ostensibly co-operative, but actually under government control."

In present-day Russia, there is no legally defined business term "artel" as a type of association; however, some companies use the word "artel" in their name, especially in areas traditionally handled by artels.

== See also ==
- Artel of Artists

== Bibliography ==
- Gordon, Manya (1918). "Education and Self-Government in Russia". Harper's Monthly Magazine. Vol. 138. pp. 270–279.
- Krotkov, Yuri (1967). I Am From Moscow: A View of the Russian Miracle. E.P. Dutton. OCLC 855279920.
