= RABIS =

Soviet trade union

RABIS (Russian: РАБИС) or Sorabis (Russian: Сорабис), the widespread Trade Union of Art Workers in Bolshevik Russia and later in the Soviet Union, was a Soviet creative union (a type of Soviet trade union) formed in May 1919. The Russian РАБИС and Сорабис are the abbreviations of the Russian phrases "РАботники ИСкусства" (English: "Art Workers") and "СОюз РАботников ИСкусства" (English: "Union of Art Workers"), the two first characters of the words "СОюз", "РАботники" and "ИСкусства" used to add abbreviations.

In 1920 a massive professional organization was formed in the Russian Soviet Federative Socialist Republic and named Vserabis (Russian: Всерабис) — "ВСЕроссийский профессиональный союз РАботников ИСкусства" (English: "All-Russian Regions Trade Union of Art Workers"). The abbreviations RABIS or Sorabis were used for local and regional Trade Unions and sometimes as short names of "Vserabis".

After the creation of the Soviet Union, from 1924 the Vserabis (Russian: Всерабис) was known by the abbreviation "ВСЕсоюзный профессиональный союз РАботников ИСкусства" (English: "Soviet Union Trade Union of Art Workers").

Some big cities or regions adjusted the name RABIS to incorporate the name of their region: Petrorabis (Petrograd RABIS); Mosgubrabis (Moscow guberniya RABIS); Gruzrabis (Gruziya RABIS).

RABIS, Sorabis and then Vserabis united all art workers "on the voluntary commencements". The Russian phrase "на добровольных началах" (English: "on the voluntary commencements") includes sarcasm, which means that each art worker entered into this trade union voluntarily (voluntary commencement), but the rest of the art workers, who left or had not joined the trade union organisation, would have difficulties with finding and holding jobs. In such cases Russians speak of "joining the organisation voluntarily-compulsorily" (Russian: "присоединиться к организации добровольно-принудительно").

== History ==
=== Prehistory ===
Some art workers' societies were formed in the Russian Empire in the 19th century. One of them was the Russian Theatrical Society (RTO) (Russian: Русское театральное общество или РТО), which was entrusted with trade union functions also. By 1915, the local departments of the Imperial Russian Theatrical Society already existed in Astrakhan, Voronezh, Kaluga, Tambov, Irkutsk, Samara and other cities of the Russian Empire.

The same status was true of many smaller creative workers' unions (for example, the Union of Actors, Union of Stagehands, Union of Theatrical Employees, Union of Painters, Union of Sculptors, and Union of Musicians), which were formed before 1919, some before the October Revolution and some after it.

In 1918 the Union of Art Workers (Russian: Союз РАботников ИСкусства (РАБИС)) of Novosibirsk Region, in Siberia, was formed.

In 1919, Anatoly Lunacharsky, the first People's Commissar of Education, responsible for culture and education, approved the "Regulation on the Russian Theatrical Society", according to which a significant portion of its rights departed to the State, including registration of contracts and control over their observance.

=== The First All-Russian Congress of Art Workers ===
The First All-Russian Congress of Art Workers was opened in the movie theater "АРС" in Moscow on 7 May 1919. A group of 23 delegates represented 25,000 art workers at this Congress. The Congress established the trade union RABIS (Russian: РАБИС) (the name of this organization was an abbreviation of the phrase "РАботники ИСкусства", "Art Workers"). This organization became the first creative union of Bolshevik Russia and united many smaller unions, such as the Union of Actors, Union of Stagehands, Union of Theatrical Employees, Union of Painters, Union of Sculptors, and Union of Musicians. Local trade unions of art workers, which were created in regional centers and major cities, and the Unions of Art Workers, which were created previously, were reassigned to the newly created RABIS.

The Statute of the RABIS was dated 1918, as it was taken from one union, which was formed in 1918. The main articles of the RABIS Statute, which was adopted at the First All-Russian Congress of Art Workers, included the main objectives of this trade union:

- Participation in arrangement of theatrical works, in the distribution and accounting of labour power, and in the raising of labour productivity.
- Economic improvement and material welfare of the members of the Union by the regulation of working time and wages.
- The implementation of measures for labour protection and social provision.
- Raising the class consciousness of their members.
- Representation and protection of the Union members' interests in state and public institutions and enterprises.

The RABIS was involved in politics. I.V. Sibiryakov mentioned in his monograph "ВСЕРАБИС: страницы истории" (English: "VSERABIS: the pages of history"): "Never had the Union been a politically neutral structure; during the years of the Civil War its leaders had positioned themselves to be part of the Red Revolutionary Movement"

In connection with the establishment of the Trade Union of Art Workers (RABIS) in May 1919, trade union functions were taken away from the Russian Theatrical Society and other art workers' unions.

=== The Second All-Russian Congress of Art Workers ===
The Second All-Russian Congress of Art Workers took place on 2–10 June 1920. More than 100 delegates represented 50,780 professionally organized members of Vserabis at this Congress. Most of the leaders of the All-Russian RABIS (Vserabis) categorically were not satisfied not only with their poor representation in the People's Commissariat for Education (Narkompros) but also with the nature of the relations that existed between this government department and the trade union. Representatives of the Trade Union of Art Workers (Vserabis) directly participated in Council of People's Commissars (Narkomat) and saw that the Narkomat leaders' focus was given first of all to education and schools, whereas the questions of art management had faded into the background. This is why the Trade Union put forward the idea to create an independent Narkomat of the arts. Vserabis numerously returned to this idea and tried to convince the All-Union Central Council of Trade Unions (VTsSPS) and the government of the need of such a Narkomat. This idea was implemented, but only under totally different conditions and in a slightly different form. So in 1920 the People's Commissariat of Education proposed another way out: on 29 October 1920, during the joint meeting of the Vserabis Central Committee Presidium, the Communist faction of the Central Committee and of the Collegium of the Narkompros Art Sector decided "... to offer Rabis to participate in the management of the art only through their representatives in the People's Commissariat of Education"; it was forbidden for the leadership and local committees of the trade union to interfere directly in the management scope, including to cancel or suspend orders of the state authorities.

=== The merger of the Vserabis and Rabpros ===
One of the main issues discussed during the Second Congress of Art Workers was the proposition to merge the Union Vserabis with the Union of Education Workers (Rabpros) (Russian: Союз Работников Просвещения (Рабпрос)). The most consistent supporter of the merger was Deputy People's Commissar of Education Ye.A. Litkens. Despite the displeasure of the leaders and ordinary members of Vserabis and Rabpros, Litkens managed to convince the members of the VTsSPS Presidium of the justification of this experiment, and the Presidium adopted the decision on 28 January 1921. According to the resolution of the Executive Committee of VTsSPS dated 1 July 1921, the All-Russian Trade Union of Art Workers (Vserabis) was merged with the Union of Education Workers (Rabpros).

=== The Third All-Russian Congress of the Union of Art Workers ===
The magazine "Вестник работников искусств" (English: "Herald of Art Workers") played an important role in the preparations for the Third All-Russian Congress of Vserabis. The Congress convened between 2 and 8 October 1921. It completed the first phase of the institutional development of the union; 665 departments of Vserabis already worked actively in the country, 183 delegates came to the Third Congress with casting votes, and 83 delegates had advisory votes. The Congress made a number of changes in the Statute of the Union. If the Statute of 1918 fixed the section as a temporary transitional measure, the Statute of 1920 secured their existence completely, significantly expanding rights. In order to fully perform and better serve the specific interests and peculiarities of everyday life of certain categories of workers, the Statute of 1920 established the existence of the following sections: artists (drama, opera, operetta, ballet, circus, music), musicians, workers of visual arts, workers of cinema and photo, workers of literature, workers and servants of the theater.

=== 1922 to 1924 ===
From 1923 RABIS again existed as an independent trade union organization. During the 6th Congress (1923), a decision was made about the cultural patronage of the Red Army. From 1924 RABIS was called the All-Union Trade Union of Art Workers (Russian: ВСЕсоюзный профессиональный союз РАБотников ИСкусства (ВСЕРАБИС)), but the abbreviation remained the same: VSERABIS.

In 1922, the AKhRR (Association of Artists of Revolutionary Russia) was formed (Russian: Ассоциация художников революционной России, Assotsiatsia Khudozhnikov Revolutsionnoi Rossii, 1922-1928), it was later known as the Association of Artists of the Revolution (Ассоциация художников революции, Assotsiatsia Khudozhnikov Revolutsii or AKhR, 1928-1932).

=== World War II and activity completion ===
A special scope of patronage applied in the years of World War II. In 1953, VSERABIS merged into a unified professional Union of Culture Workers.

== OGPU and Sorabis ==
Some workers of GPU Political Control, who also were often the censors, were members of the trade union Sorabis (Union of Art Workers) and agents of the OGPU at the same time, as is evident from their track record. With conspiratorial purposes, they often changed trade union books, such as the record books called Trade Union "lipa" (Russian: липа ("lindens"), and GPU agents were supplied with trade union books by the GPU Secret-operative Department. A document from the archive confirms this:

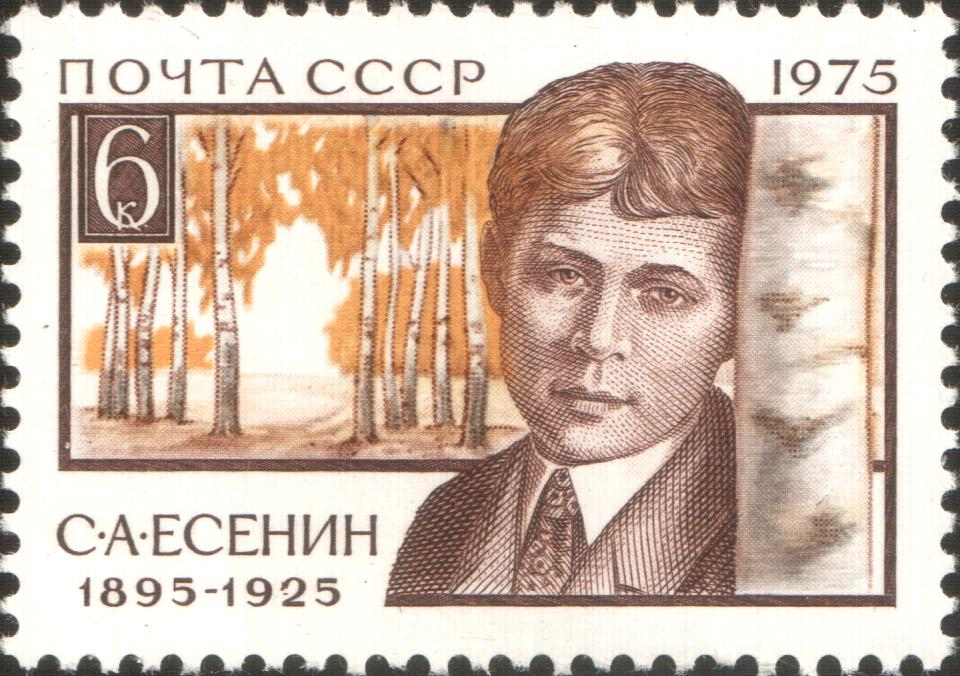
Soviet stamp in honor Russian poet Sergey Yesenin.

"Strictest secrecyTo the Trade Union of Art Workers.The Secret-operative Department of the OGPU Plenipotentiary Representative in Leningrad Military District hereby requests to issue (10) pieces of the membership books for the secret-operative works under the responsibility of the OGPU in the LMD.The head of the PP OGPU in LMD               (Messing) (Signature)The head of the SOCh                         (Raiskiy) (Signature)The head of the 4th department of the SOCh   (Kutin)   (Sigrature)30 December 1925."[13]

The fake membership book was used by the OGPU to kill Russian poet Sergey Yesenin.

== Number of RABIS members ==
In 1919	In 1923	In 1926	In 1953
25,000 members	50,000 members	81,000 members	150,000 members

== Press organs of RABIS ==
«Вестник работников искусств» (English: «Herald of Art Workers») was a magazine and a press organ of the RABIS Central Committee from 1920 through 1926. This magazine was renamed «Rabis» in 1927 and under this new name was published from 1927 to 1934.

== RABIS and sport ==
The sport club «Rabis» (Trade Union of Art Workers) played volleyball and won a game against the team of the sports society «Dynamo» (Moscow).
