= Enterprises in the Soviet Union =

For most of its existence, the vast majority of enterprises in the Soviet Union were state-owned, with a minority being small, cooperatively owned ones (such as artels and production cooperatives). The Russian term for "enterprise" is "предприятие", "predpriyatiye" and it is usually translated as "company".

== Overview ==
For the majority of the History of the Soviet Union, except for the periods of NEP and perestroika, the ownership of the means of production and hence the enterprises belonged to the Soviet people as a whole. The right of ownership for the vast majority (i.e., excluding cooperative enterprises) was exercised by the Soviet state via its ministries and other agencies at various levels of management. Mikhail Gorbachev and his team believed that a key reason for the poor performance of the Soviet economy lay in the issue of ownership, and the main task of economic reforms during perestroika was, as the Soviet leadership put it, "denationalization and demonopolization of the economy and the development of enterprise and competition".

In addition to state enterprises, "промысловая кооперация", i.e., production cooperatives, were composed of small producers, artisans and/or craftsmen, existed until the mid-1960s. These were shut down and their assets, if any, were transferred to state ownership by the resolution of the Central Committee of the CPSU and the Council of Ministers of the USSR of April 14, 1956, "On the Reorganization of Production Cooperation" (О реорганизации промысловой кооперации). The 24th Congress of the CPSU partially reversed this policy, recognizing the necessity of significantly expanding the production of consumer goods using local resources, envisioning the development of crafts' enterprises and subsidiary industrial production.

== New Economic Policy ==
After the October Revolution, all means of production were nationalized, including foreign businesses. The New Economic Policy (NEP) reintroduced private enterprises for small and medium-sized businesses, while the state continued to control large industries, banks and foreign trade. The 1923 Law on Concessions allowed for foreign concessions in the USSR. However, in 1928 Joseph Stalin terminated the NEP, re-nationalized most of the economy, and banned foreign businesses. Following the 27 December 1930 decree of Sovnarkom on concessions, by the mid-1930s the vast majority of concessions were discontinued and even unilaterally terminated by the Soviet Union, being replaced with concessional contracts.

== Joint Enterprise Decree ==
By 1983, the Soviet Union approved joint production within Comecon (a.k.a. CMEA). On January 13, 1987, the USSR Council of Ministers issued the "Joint Enterprise Decree" (full name: О порядке создания на территории СССР и деятельности совместных предприятий с участием советских организаций и фирм капиталистических и развивающихся стран), authorizing the formation of joint enterprises between companies from states outside of Comecon (and retroactively within Comecon) and some Soviet entities (cooperation within Comecon). The first officially registered international joint entity was Литтара-Воланпак, between Littara (of Lithuanian SSR) and Volánpack (of the People's Republic of Hungary), which was engaged in packaging. By 1989, 448 international joint enterprises were registered. While the authorized capital of the joint enterprise could include foreign property, the Soviet part was still state-owned, coming from a Soviet legal entity.

== Perestroika era ==
By 1987 the number of industrial enterprises in the Soviet Union was about 47,000. Since 1988, new forms of enterprises began to emerge, although not exactly private, such as cooperatives, leasing arrangements, and the so-called "small enterprises," many of which were established on the basis of plants and other work units of state enterprises. By 1990, state ownership continued to be the predominant form of enterprise, constituting approximately 84% of the workforce and 87% of national income. The legal framework for new enterprise types remained ambiguous. The initial steps in this direction were initiated in 1986 with the introduction of the "Law on Individual Labor Activity." In 1990, the regulation of various enterprise types was consolidated in the "Law on Enterprises in the USSR" enacted on June 4, 1990. However, the law was only briefly in place, as the dissolution of the Soviet Union in December 1991 led to its discontinuation.

=== Law on Individual Labor Activity ===
The "Law on Individual Labor Activity" capitalized on the experience of other states of Eastern Bloc, Poland and East Germany in particular, where small private enterprises demonstrated success. Its adoption was preceded by heated discussion in the press and in the state and party management. Gorbachev's speech at the 27th Congress of the Communist Party of the Soviet Union postulated the support of the cooperative enterprises:

We are for complete clarity in the question of cooperative property. It has NOT [sic] exhausted its potential in socialist production, in better satisfying people's needs. Many kolkhozes and other cooperative organizations demonstrate effective management of doing the job. And where there is a need, the formation and development of cooperative enterprises and organizations should be supported in every possible way. They should be widely used in the production and processing of products, in housing and garden construction, in the sphere of consumer services and trade.

By the late 1980s, tens of thousands of people were officially registered to engage in economic activities, primarily in crafts and trade sectors. Additionally, a larger number of individuals participated in the clandestine "second economy of the Soviet Union." Both legal and illegal entrepreneurs faced the risk of criminal prosecution for "unearned income" as distinguishing between "honestly" and "dishonestly" earned income was challenging. The new "Law on Individual Labor Activity" legalized many of the individual economic activities.

=== Law on State Enterprise (Association), 1987 ===
The Law on State Enterprise (Association) of June 20, 1987, was enacted on January 1, 1988, and ceased to be effective on March 7, 1991.

=== Law on Enterprises in the USSR, 1990 ===
Most enterprises were classified into three major categories, according to the major forms of property in the Soviet Union:

- Based on the property of Soviet citizens: individual enterprises and family enterprises
- Based on the collective property: collective enterprises, production cooperatives, various incorporated businesses: partnerships, joint-stock companies, etc., and enterprises of public (общественные) or religious (религиозные) organizations
- Based on the state property: Union state enterprises, republican state enterprises, communal state enterprises
- There were also other types, e.g. mixed enterprises (смешанные предприятия) or rental enterprises (арендные предприятия)
