= Creative unions in the Soviet Union =

Creative unions (Russian: творческие союзы) in the Soviet Union were voluntary societies that united Soviet citizens according to their creative (artistic) occupations. They were similar to Soviet trade unions; more specifically, in Soviet ideology and law they were a subset of trade unions, because creative professionals were officially a type of worker. Unofficially, many of their members differentiated themselves culturally from blue-collar workers.

The earliest of them were established in 1932 after disbanding the previous unions, such as RAPP, RAPM, RABIS, and AKhRR.

Like nearly everything in the Soviet Union, they operated under the strict ideological supervision of the Communist Party, and what is more, the creative unions were means of an effective control over the artistic production of their members: the members of these unions had priority in publishing of their works. Usually people expelled from a union could not make any significant money from their creative work. On the other hand, being a member was associated with various perks.

== List of unions ==
- USSR Union of Architects (1932)
- USSR Union of Artists (1957; republican, oblast and city Unions of Soviet Artists existed since 1932)
- USSR Union of Cinematographers (1965)
- USSR Union of Composers (1932, as the Union of Soviet Composers)
- USSR Union of Designers (1987)
- USSR Union of Journalists (1959)
- USSR Union of Music Workers (1986, as All-Union Musical Society)
- USSR Union of Theatre Workers (1986)
- USSR Union of Writers (1932, as the Union of Soviet Writers)

== See also ==
- Socialist realism
- Engineers of the human soul
- ru:Категория:Творческие союзы

== Bibliography ==
- Willis, David K. (1985), Klass: How Russians Really Live, London: St Martin's Press, ISBN 978-0312457631, LCCN 85001740, OCLC 11623350.
