= Trade unions in the Soviet Union =

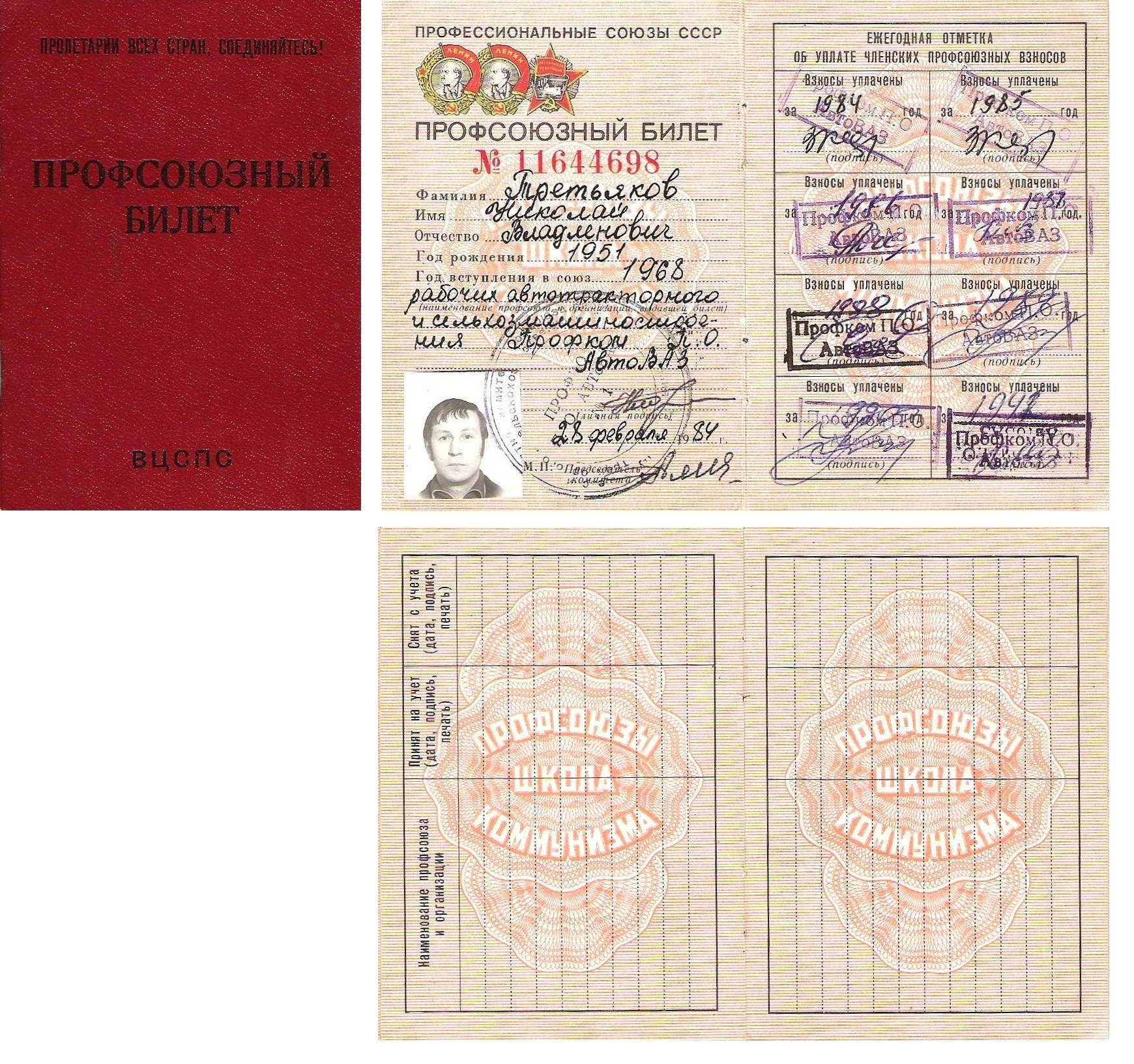
A membership card of the All-Union Central Council of Trade Unions of the USSR. The slogan was that "the trade unions are a school of communism."

Trade unions in the Soviet Union, headed by the All-Union Central Council of Trade Unions (VTsSPS or ACCTU in English), had a complex relationship with industrial management, the Communist Party of the Soviet Union, and the Soviet government, given that the Soviet Union was ideologically supposed to be a state in which the members of the working class both ruled the country and managed themselves.

During the Russian Revolution and the Russian Civil War that immediately followed, there were several ideas about how to organize and manage industries, and many people thought that the trade unions would be the vehicle of workers' control of industries. By the Stalinist era of the 1930s, it was clear that the party and government were dominant and that the trade unions were not permitted to challenge them in any substantial way. In the decades after Stalin, the worst of the powerlessness of the unions was past, but Soviet trade unions remained something closer to company unions, answering to the party and government, than to truly independent organizations. They did, however, challenge aspects of mismanagement more successfully than they had under Stalin, and they played important parts in the fabric of daily life, such as using a sports club, obtaining theatre tickets, booking vacation stays, and more.

By the time of the dissolution of the Soviet Union, the trade union system consisted of thirty unions organized by occupational branch. Including about 732,000 locals and 135 million members in 1984, unions encompassed almost all Soviet employees with the exception of some 4 to 5 million kolkhozniks, all of which were independent from the government. The All-Union Central Council of Trade Unions served as an umbrella organization for the thirty branch unions and was by far the largest public organization in the Soviet Union.

== Chronology ==
=== Early decades ===
Soviet trade unions, headed by the All-Union Central Council of Trade Unions (Всесоюзный Центральный Совет Профессиональных Союзов, ВЦСПС [VTsSPS]), traced their history back to the 1905 Russian Revolution, roughly 15 years before the Soviet Union was founded. At the time there was a flourishing movement in the Russian Empire toward workers' rights, not just among those socialists who sought workers' control of industry (syndicalism, union democracy, and so on) but also among socially conservative workers who simply wanted better education, working conditions, and remuneration and were willing to organize to get them. Simultaneously, however, the founding of trade unions in the Russian Empire at this time was salted with influence by the Okhrana, which sought to co-opt this movement from its beginning in order to keep it under control. It is not easy today to know how much influence the police had in controlling the budding popular movement, as Soviet historiography mostly overwrote any pre-revolution historical traces that remained.

Many trade unions were shut down or restricted on the eve of World War I and during that war, but they revived after the February Revolution of 1917, and their leaders were democratically elected in the following months. After the October Revolution later that year, some anarchist and Bolshevik trade unionists hoped that unions would manage industry (participatory management). A strong factory committee movement had sprung up, from workers occupying workplaces or forcing their bosses into compliance with demands as the government would no longer protect them. However, as the Bolsheviks seized and consolidated power, this movement was ended by the nationalization of industries.

With the Russian Civil War and the Bolshevik policy of war communism, the trade unions lost staff to government, party, and military organs. Government economic organs, like the All-Russian Council of the Economy (VSNKh), increasingly took the primary role in directing industry, which lost many workers due to the economic crisis. The Bolsheviks' communist party, the Russian Social Democratic Labour Party (bolsheviks), exerted increasing control over trade unions, which even many communist trade union leaders resisted. By the end of the Civil War, a dispute over the role of trade unions occurred within the party, which had become the Russian Communist Party (bolsheviks) and would soon become the Communist Party of the Soviet Union.

Leon Trotsky, Nikolay Krestinsky and some others insisted on militarization of trade unions and actually turning them into part of the government apparatus. The Workers' Opposition (Alexander Shlyapnikov, Alexandra Kollontai) demanded that trade unions manage the economy through an "All-Union Congress of Producers" and that workers comprise a majority of Communist Party members and leaders. There were several other factions. Eventually, all of them were defeated at the 10th Congress of the Russian Communist Party (Bolsheviks) by the so-called "Platform of the Ten" headed by Lenin, which called for trade unions to educate workers as "schools of communism" without turning the trade unions into state institutions. After that congress, Vladimir Lenin's saying that "Trade Unions are a School of Communism" became an indisputable slogan.

Like the Communist Party, the trade unions operated on the principle of democratic centralism, and they consisted of hierarchies of elected bodies from the central governing level down to the factory and local committees.

Because of the course that was determined as the Bolsheviks defeated other models of socialism, Soviet trade unions ended up, in fact, actually governmental organizations whose chief aim was not to represent workers but to further the goals of management, government, and the CPSU and primarily promoted production interests. In this respect, through the Western lens of a dichotomy of independent unions versus company unions, they were more accurately comparable to company unions, as "unlike unions in the West, the Soviet variety do not fight for the economic interests of the workers. They are conveyor belts for Party instructions, carrying punishments and rewards to industrial and collective farm employees. Soviet trade unions work with their employer, the government, and not against it." The same was true of trade unions in the Soviet satellite Eastern Bloc states between the late 1940s and late 1980s (except that Solidarity in Poland broke out of total subordination during the 1980s). Trade unions in China are also subordinate to the party and to state economic planning.

=== Stalin era ===
During Lenin's rule, a resolution entitled About Party Unity had dissolved and banned any factions within the Party under the pretext that intra-Party discussions distract from "solving actual practical problems". This resolution radically shifted the balance in the notion "democratic centralism" from "democratic" to "centralism" and helped lay the groundwork for Joseph Stalin's future centrally planned economic policies.

During the Great Purge, the distortion of interests, whereby unions fought for state production interests rather than workers' direct interests of compensation and safety, reached the point of absurdity, as no degree of unsafe working conditions or low pay could be countered by the unions if the party and state decided that the sacrifices must be made. The head of the trade union council during the 1920s, Mikhail Tomsky, first was deposed and some years later committed suicide to avoid the false persecution of the purges. He was rehabilitated decades later under de-Stalinization.

Not all were unsympathetic during this era. Many people lived poor but optimistic and relatively improved lives, eagerly attending various forms of schools, including evening schools for workers, trade schools (tekhnikums, institutes), and others. Trade unions organized remedial reading programs to help illiterate adults to learn to read and write. Illiteracy was a common problem at the time; it had only been within a single lifetime that serfdom had ended, and much of the population were just coming out of traditional peasant backgrounds and lifestyles that involved minimal education. The civil war had caused many skilled people to flee the lands of the former empire. There was a superabundance of unskilled laborers but shortages of most kinds of skilled laborers, a situation that the party, all levels of government, industrial plant administrations, and trade unions all worked on remediating with education and training programs. This was an era when much of the populace was still optimistic about the potential of Leninist socialism. Unlike the 1980s when very few were left who believed enthusiastically in the bureaucratic system, there was still esprit de corps among many members of the public whereby they were willing to work hard and endure hardships for the sake of building a society that would continue to develop increasing levels of education and standard of living. Thus, for example, the worklife of physicians in Magnitogorsk in the 1930s was described in John Scott's memoir: "Soviet doctors had a legal working day of four or five hours. If they worked more than this, they received overtime pay. In Magnitogorsk, due to the tremendous shortage of doctors, most of them worked one and a half to two, and sometimes even two and a half to three jobs, which meant up to fifteen hours. This was strictly illegal, but inasmuch as there were not enough doctors, the Board of Health was permitted by the Medical Workers' Trade Union to allow its employees to work more than the legal working day."

Robert W. Thurston showed that state control of trade unions does not always, or even usually, mean that union members are entirely powerless "victims" of the state. It does not mean that they never criticize anything and have no power to effect changes in working conditions; rather, what it means is that there are strong limits on criticism of senior levels of the system and, as a counterpart to that, even greater tendency to criticize the lower levels. In general, citizens in an authoritarian society are not all "victims" of the system; many are active participants and even advocates. This is further explored below.

=== After Stalin ===
Before the worst of the Terror and in the decades after Stalin, Soviet trade unions did have some input regarding production plans, capital improvements in factories, local housing construction, and remuneration agreements with management. After Stalin, unions also were empowered to protect workers against bureaucratic and managerial arbitrariness, to ensure that management adhered to collective agreements, and to protest unsafe working conditions. However, strikes were still more or less restricted, representing an element of Stalinism that persisted even during the Khrushchev Thaw. Unions remained partners of management in attempting to promote labor discipline, worker morale, and productivity. Unions organized socialist emulation "competitions" and awarded prizes for fulfilling quotas. They also distributed welfare benefits, operated cultural and sports facilities (Palaces of Culture), issued passes to health centers (such as spa towns and seaside resorts) for subsidized vacations (a popular idea conceived in the 1920s, which even the Nazi regime had coopted, although mostly unrealized for Soviets until after the war), oversaw factory and local housing construction, provided catering services, and awarded bonus payments. The newspaper Trud and the magazine Soviet Trade Unions (Советские профсоюзы) were major media of the Soviet trade union system.

=== Late Soviet period ===
The trade union system in the late Soviet Union consisted of thirty unions organized by occupational branch. Including about 732,000 locals and 135 million members in 1984, unions encompassed almost all Soviet employees with the exception of some 4 to 5 million kolkhozniks. Enterprises employing twenty-five or more people had locals, and membership was compulsory. Dues were about 1% of a person's salary. The All-Union Central Council of Trade Unions served as an umbrella organization for the thirty branch unions and was by far the largest public organization in the Soviet Union.

Union membership influenced union operations only at the local level, where an average of 60% of a union's central committee members were rank-and-file workers.

In the early 1980s, the new political power achieved by the Polish trade union movement, Solidarity, aroused great interest and emotion in the Soviet Union, from excitement and optimism in many to revulsion and disgust in others, depending on sympathies with Soviet orthodoxy (or lack thereof). The substantial amount of the latter was respectably logical in the respect that there were many people in the USSR and the Eastern Bloc who were willing to accept the flaws of the system as long as they were fairly secure in their position within its pecking order—especially given that for half a century the only real alternative had been second-class citizen status (real albeit not nominal) or the gulag. They were not amenable to upstart, independent-of-the-party political power by trade unions. But many others were long since ready for reform of stagnation and bottomless subordination, and these others were willing to try asserting some impetus for reform. Soviet trade unions became a bit more vocal in protecting workers' interests.

== Role in the Soviet class system, chekism, and party rule ==
David K. Willis analyzed the de facto Soviet class system, including the trade unions' important role in it, in a 1985 monograph. Soviet ideology recognized social class in Soviet society but recognized only an idealized version of it, not the de facto reality.

The ideal was twofold: in the long term, once communism began, which in Soviet ideological terms meant the advent of the true communist society after the socialist society, Soviet culture would be classless in the sense that everyone would belong to a single class of workers within which there would be diversity of types/specializations but no strata of privilege; in the short to medium term, in preparation for that development, the Union was supposed to have a Marxist–Leninist class system in which two classes, workers and peasants, had (through both violence and paternalism) vanquished, by class conflict, all other (nonsocialist) classes (such as bourgeois merchants and tradesmen, kulaks, industrialist/financier capitalists, nobles, and royals) and in which the intelligentsia and indeed the Party itself were subsets of the workers (specifically, vanguard subsets).

However, the reality of class that emerged by the 1940s and persisted through the 1980s was quite different in that there were many nuanced social strata, anthropologically with more in common with imperial, aristocratic cultures (such as that of the Russian Empire) than could ever be officially admitted.

The Soviet version was shaped by the side effects of central planning—material scarcity and interpersonal connections trading on systemic corruption—rather than by money. The goal of gaming the system was to acquire social prestige, and visible tokens or badges thereof, that showed that one's talent for the gameplay surpassed others' talent. The trade unions and creative unions had an important role in this system of klass by being the forum in which many of the interpersonal connections trading on corruption were operated, with enforced exclusion for people who did not play by the unwritten rules. People who wished to contend in the widespread competitive social climbing between the strata needed their trade union membership as one of the leverage tools.

For example, one needed to be seen attending good theatre performances, owning desirable foreign-built appliances, and eating good cuts of meat, but tickets for the good performances and the opportunities to buy the covetable goods were scarce, with distribution controlled by such social networks. Chekism and single-party rule were both firmly established in, and protected by, this system, because one's good standing in one's trade union depended on staying on the right side of the unions' KGB liaisons/agents and of its party organization.

Regarding Moscow State University during the Soviet era, Willis described parents calling in klass favors with the "triangular power structure of the University: the local Party branch, the Young Communist League [local branch], and the trade union committee". On the surface, it might seem that this contradicts a statement by Willis elsewhere that "Soviet labor unions have little power" and that "they are merely conveyor belts on which Party discipline and rewards reach the work force, and which carry back reports on workers' mood and complaints." But the consistency is found by understanding that the original purpose of trade unions—to fight for workers' interests in better compensation and safety—was no longer what Soviet trade unions were for, de facto, from the 1930s onward, although it remained their de jure identity.

Instead, they were instruments of party rule, influencing members' personal choices and decisions with carrots and sticks. Statements of their "little power" refer implicitly to the assumption that fighting for workers' interests was their purpose, which it was on paper but not in reality. In fact they had ample power for their real purpose, which was enforcing conformity with carrots and sticks.

This is also why dismissive statements that "trade unions were only for perks" are misleading. It was precisely by controlling the comfort of members, or lack thereof, that the unions helped the party and government to rule, and this constituted a real, and thoroughly political, socioeconomic force, not merely an apolitical doling out of treats. As Willis pointed out, the Soviet economic system was unlike Western ones in that organizations—party, state, government, unions—controlled whether it was even possible to obtain the tools and materials to do one's vocation or avocation. In many cases there was no "shopping at another store if you don't like this one," so to speak, as there would be in the West.

Thus, withholding of privileges by a trade union could effectively shut down one's self-expression. Rather than an apolitical act, it (much to the contrary) represented political power, and was part of the Soviet censorship apparatus. The trade unions' role as an analogue of company unions helped enforced party rule of the Soviet economy's central planning by exerting pressure on members to fulfill the plan (meet quotas), inform on dissent, and uphold hegemony. The history of RABIS (the Trade Union of Art Workers), AKhRR (Association of Artists of Revolutionary Russia), and the Artists' Union of the USSR is illustrative.

The security organs (e.g., OGPU, NKVD, NKGB, MGB, KGB) often used VTsSPS job titles and duties as non-official cover for their officers visiting other countries or escorting foreign visitors on (carefully staged) tours of the USSR and its enterprises. This police cover aspect continued throughout the life span of the USSR.

Thurston showed how a complete understanding of trade unions in an authoritarian system includes understanding that not everyone in such a society is a "victim" of it. Many are active participants and even advocates of it. Many Soviet people actively participated in the trade union system and were able to criticize up to certain levels in certain safe ways, except during the heights of purges, such as during 1937 itself. Willis's study, discussed above, confirms this aspect, showing that the people who "won" in the effort to achieve Klass were by no means the "victims" of the system: quite the opposite, they were its active supporters. However, this also does not mean that the system was not authoritarian.

Rather, what it shows is that many people will support an authoritarian system with the strong ingroup-outgroup ("us versus them") aspect of tribalism, in which they belong to the tribe that supports the system. In this schema, both foreign and domestic opposition are crushed politically as opposing tribes/outgroups, and the definition of loyal opposition is limited to opposition that is loyal not only to the state but also to the senior levels of the politically dominating party.

== See also ==
- Creative unions in the Soviet Union, for creative workers (writers, artists, etc.), analogues or subsets of the trade unions (depending on ideological viewpoint)
- Red International of Trade Unions

== Bibliography ==
- Ashwin, Sarah and Simon Clarke. Russian Trade Unions and Industrial Relations in Transition. NY: Palgrave Macmillan, 2003.
- Bonnell, Victoria. Roots of Rebellion: Workers' Politics and Organizations in St. Petersburg and Moscow, 1900–1914. Berkeley and Los Angeles: University of California Press, 1983.
- Davis, Sue. Trade Unions in Russia and Ukraine, 1985–1995. New York: Palgrave Macmillan, 2002.
- Deutscher, Isaac. Soviet Trade Unions: Their Place in Soviet Labour Policy. Royal Institute of International Affairs (London and New York) and Oxford University Press (London), 1950.
- Gordon, Manya (1938), "Organized Labor under the Soviets", Foreign Affairs, 16 (3): 537–541, doi:10.2307/20028872, JSTOR 20028872.
- Gordon, Manya (1941), Workers Before and After Lenin, New York: E.P. Dutton & Co, OCLC 32121469.
- Koenker, Diane P. (2008-03-13), 'The Right to Rest': Postwar Vacations in the Soviet Union (PDF), NCEEER (National Council for Eurasian and East European Research).
- Ruble, Blair. Soviet Trade Unions: Their Development in the 1970s. Cambridge: Cambridge University Press, 1981.
- Scott, John (1989) [1942], Kotkin, Stephen (ed.), Behind the Urals: An American Worker in Russia's City of Steel, Indiana University Press, ISBN 978-0253205360.
- Sorenson, Jay. The Life and Death of Soviet Trade Unionism, 1917–1928. New York, 1969.
- – Soviet Union
- Solovyov, Vladimir; Klepikova, Elena (1983), Yuri Andropov: a secret passage into the Kremlin, Macmillan, ISBN 0026122901.
- Volkogonov, Dmitri (1998), Shukman, Harold (ed.), Autopsy for an Empire: The Seven Leaders Who Built the Soviet Regime, Free Press/Simon and Schuster, ISBN 0684834200
- Willis, David K. (1985), Klass: How Russians Really Live, London: St Martin's Press, ISBN 978-0312457631, LCCN 85001740, OCLC 11623350.
