= Russian Theatrical Society =

Russian Theatrical Society or RTO (Russian: Русское театральное общество (РТО)) was a theatrical society, which was formed in the Russian Empire and worked during the Bolshevik Russia and Soviet Union periods. It was a Trade Union of the stage workers until 1919, when was formed the Trade Union of Art Workers (RABIS). RTO was renamed the All-Russian Theatrical Society or VTO (Russian: Всероссийское театральное общество (ВТО)) in 1933.

== History ==
=== Russian Empire period ===
On 13 October 1883, the Society for the Benefit of Needy Stage Workers was organized on the initiative of the famous actress Maria Gavrilovna Savina. Among the founders of the society, which engaged in philanthropic works, were artists Vladimir Nikolayevich Davydov, Nikolai Fyodorovich Sazonov, the writer Dmitry Vasilyevich Grigorovich, the historian A. A. Krayevsky, and others.

In 1894, the society was reorganized and became known as the Russian Theatrical Society or RTO. It sought to provide its members with professional, legal and social protection. Its revenue came from membership fees, banking operations income, donations and revenues from the theatres. RTO organized the First Congress of the Stage Workers, which was held in March 1897. It discussed the problems of the repertoire, creation of permanent troupes, training and education of theater directors, situation in theatrical schools, protection of theatres from the censorship.

By 1915, the local departments of the Imperial Russian Theatrical Society already existed in Astrakhan, Voronezh, Kaluga, Tambov, Irkutsk, Samara and other cities of the Russian Empire. The Russian Provisional Government revised the status of the RTO in 1917: in addition to the public functions RTO was entrusted with state functions.

=== Bolshevik Russia and Soviet Union periods ===
In 1919, Anatoly Lunacharsky approved the "Regulation on the Russian Theatrical Society", according to which a significant portion of its functions was to the State including registration of contracts and control over their observance. In connection with the establishment of the Trade Union of Art Workers (RABIS) in 1919, trade union functions were taken away from the RTO.

The formation of the RTO network of operational formations and workshops, which will be a material and financial basis of activities of the organization, was carried out in the 1920s. New statute was adopted on 10 February 1933, under which the society was renamed the All-Russian Theatrical Society. Its chairman was Aleksandra Aleksandrovna Yablochkina from 1915, then from 1964 to 1986 it was headed by Mickail Ivanovich Tsaryov. The VTO Statute was changed repeatedly, but the essence of the activities of the society remained the same: to provide creative, consultative and methodological assistance, social activities.

In 1986, the VTO was transformed into the Union of Theatre Workers of the Russian Federation or STD of RSFSR (Russian: Союз Театральныз деятелей России (СТД России)). The STD joined theatrical workers of the Russian Federation with a goal to support the development of theatrical art, the rendering of practical assistance to the Russian theatres and theatrical schools, all-round development of Russian and international theatrical ties.
