= Union of Theatre Workers of the Russian Federation =

Russian actors' trade union (founded 1887)

- Союз театральных деятелей Российской Федерации
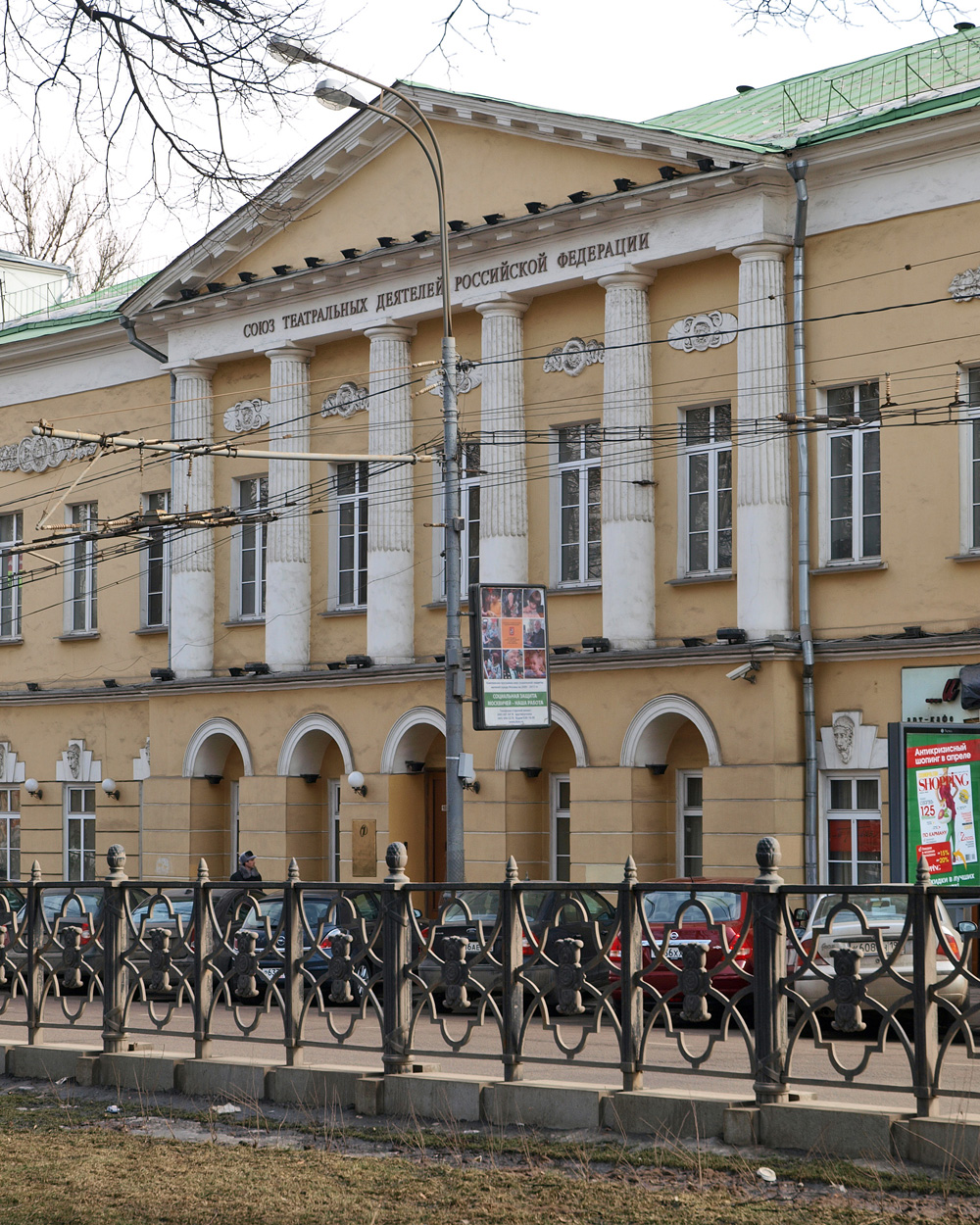
- Headquarter of the Union of Theatre Workers in the Strastnoy Boulevard in Moscow
- Established: 1877
- Headquarters: Moscow, Russia
- Coordinates: 55°46′00″N 37°36′39″E
- Chairman: Vladimir Mashkov
- Website: stdrf.ru

The Union of Theatre Workers of the Russian Federation or STD of RSFSR (Russian: Союз театральных деятелей Российской Федерации (СТД РСФСР)) is the principal actors and theatrical workers union of Russia founded in 1887. It was previously known as the Russian Theatrical Society.

The Russian Theatrical Society had its own theatrical and opera ensembles, which toured the Soviet Union, and also the frontline during the Great Patriotic War. The VTO Soviet Opera Ensemble was founded by Ivan Kozlovsky in 1938.
