= Manya Gordon =

American historian (1882–1945)

Manya Gordon Strunsky (1882 – December 27, 1945) was a Ukrainian-born Russian-expatriate American historian and political activist. Gordon is best remembered as a pioneering social historian of the Soviet Union, especially Soviet Russia, through her seminal 1941 book, Workers Before and After Lenin, which looks at the track record of Vladimir Lenin and his heirs in transforming the economy of the Russian Empire into that of the Soviet Union.

== Biography ==
=== Early years ===
Manya Gordon was born in about 1882 in the city of Kiev, Russian Empire (now Ukraine). A family of ethnic Jews, the Gordons emigrated to the United States from the increasingly antisemitic Tsarist regime in 1896, settling in New York City. Gordon was educated at home but later received academic training in history and drama through courses completed at Columbia University.

In New York Gordon was active in the American section of the Russian Socialist Revolutionary Party (PSR), an organization dedicated to the forcible overthrow of Tsarist autocracy in Russia. She was also involved in assisting newly-arrived Jewish émigrés from Russia and Eastern Europe, as a fellow Jewish-American helping them to find jobs and housing in America.

=== Scholarship ===
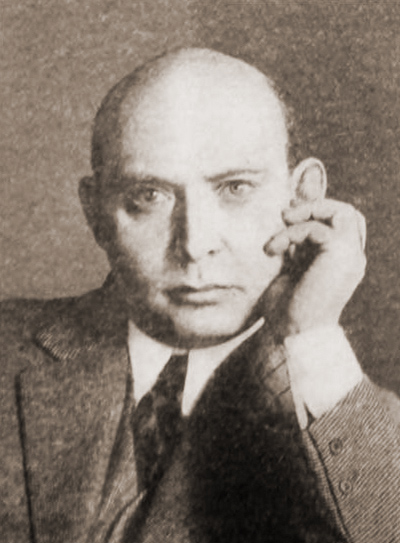
Manya Gordon Strunsky's husband was the essayist Simeon Strunsky.

After the Russian Revolution, Gordon worked as a freelance journalist specializing in the topic, contributing articles to Harper's Magazine, the North American Review, and other publications. Her entry into the journalistic orbit brought her into contact with Simeon Strunsky, an essayist and member of the New York Times editorial board, whom she later married, legally taking her husband's surname while continuing to use her maiden name as a pen name. The couple had two children.

In the years immediately after the October Revolution, when the Bolsheviks were murdering fellow socialists as assiduously as they were murdering conservatives in the Russian Civil War, Gordon critiqued their reasoning:

Immediately after the Bolsheviki acquired power they let it be known that the success of the socialist republic rested upon their ability to effect a revolution among the proletariat of the warring nations [world revolution]. It is now unnecessary to discuss the possibility of such a revolution [i.e., it had collapsed] [...] But the Bolshevik policy of revolution abroad is pertinent in so far as it illustrates the clarity of Bolshevik reasoning. Assuming that Lenine had accomplished a revolution in Europe, what then? Had he any reason to suppose that the European proletariat would be more radical than the Social-Democrats and Socialist Revolutionists in Russia, whom he rubricated as “reactionaries” and “enemies of the Revolution”? That being so, what affinity could there be between the European proletariat and his autocracy? Again, if Lenine was really of the opinion that a socialist state in Russia was impossible without the coöperation of the proletariat of Europe, how did he expect to establish it without the participation of the majority Socialist party in Russia itself?

— Manya Gordon, "Bolshevik Realities and American Fancies", The Century Magazine, 99: 679–688, 1920.

The continual development of the Revolution to form Soviet culture and the Soviet economy was an ongoing source of fascination in the United States throughout the decades of the 1920s and 1930s (whether horrified, enthusiastic, or merely curious fascination, depending on each reader). Demand existed for reporting and analysis of what was happening in the USSR. In the 30s Strunsky began work on a monograph dealing with the evolution of treatment of the working class before and after the advent of Bolshevik power. This was published in 1941 as Workers Before and After Lenin by prominent New York publisher E.P. Dutton and Company. In the book Gordon's "bottom-up" attention to the lives of common people rather than the intricacies of high politics anticipated the turn to social history during the 1960s and beyond in the field of Soviet Studies.

In Workers Before and After Lenin Gordon made use of Soviet sources of economic data in arguing that under the Communist regime the standard of living of the working class had deteriorated substantially. The point of using Soviet-issued data was that even the government's own rosy numbers showed a deteriorated reality, precluding any specious rebuttal by Soviet officials or their supporters along the lines that the analysis would be wrong for having used flawed data. Gordon showed that the purchasing power of wages in the late 1930s stood at only about 75% of the food value purchasable by Russian workers in the years immediately preceding World War I. Nominal wage gains (which the government boasted about) had been more than offset by large price increases, including of staple goods, while consumer goods were shoddy and in poor supply, Gordon argued. She also made the point that it would have been historically realistic to expect economic growth in the decades since the prewar years, meaning that Soviet performance needed to be judged not just on comparison with 1910 standards but also on comparison with the opportunity cost of forgoing a more February-oriented existence between 1917 and 1941, which October forestalled. She then pointed out that meanwhile political freedom had degraded to virtually zero, and although the very point of the existence of trade unions is to protect workers' interests from undue exploitation by their employers, the trade unions in the Soviet Union had become totally unable to do that, as they were completely controlled by the abusive employer, namely, the state. A strikingly poignant epigraph on the title page of the book showed the depth of irony in what the Soviet regime had become by 1941; Gordon silently held up Lenin's own words alone, which formed an indictment:

Without political freedom all forms of workers' representation will continue to be a fraud. The proletariat will remain as heretofore in prison.

— Lenin, 1905

A second book, How to Tell Progress from Reaction: Roads to Industrial Democracy, was published by the same publisher in 1944.

=== Later years ===
Throughout the 1930s Gordon did solidarity work with imprisoned Russian social democrats in the Soviet Union, serving as Secretary of the New York Society for Socialist Party Prisoners and Exiles in Soviet Russia.

In later years Strunsky worked as a literary critic for the New York magazine Saturday Review of Literature.

=== Death and legacy ===
Manya Gordon Strunsky died of a heart attack on December 27, 1945 in New Canaan, Connecticut. She was 63 years old at the time of her death. She left a legacy of evidence-based political and historical analysis that showed the squandered potential of the February Revolution and how a humane and progressive type of social democracy—which, as a center-left position, is often attacked and disparaged from both left and right—belies the flaws of its detractors' arguments.

== Bibliography ==
=== Works by Gordon ===
- Gordon, Manya (1918), "Education and Self-Government in Russia", Harper's Monthly Magazine, 138: 270–279.
- Gordon, Manya (1920), "Bolshevik Realities and American Fancies", The Century Magazine, 99: 679–688.
- Gordon, Manya (1922), "Democratic Forces in Russia", North American Review, 215: 155–166.
- Gordon, Manya (1938), "Organized Labor under the Soviets", Foreign Affairs, 16 (3): 537–541, doi:10.2307/20028872, JSTOR 20028872.
- Gordon, Manya (1941), Workers Before and After Lenin, New York: E.P. Dutton & Co, OCLC 32121469.
- Gordon, Manya (1944), How to Tell Progress from Reaction: Roads to Industrial Democracy, New York: E.P. Dutton & Co, OCLC 498825930.

=== Works by others ===
- Scott, John (1989) [1942], Kotkin, Stephen (ed.), Behind the Urals: An American Worker in Russia's City of Steel, Indiana University Press, ISBN 978-0253205360, archived from the original on 2017-09-05.
