= Simeon Strunsky =

Russian-born Jewish American essayist and editorialist

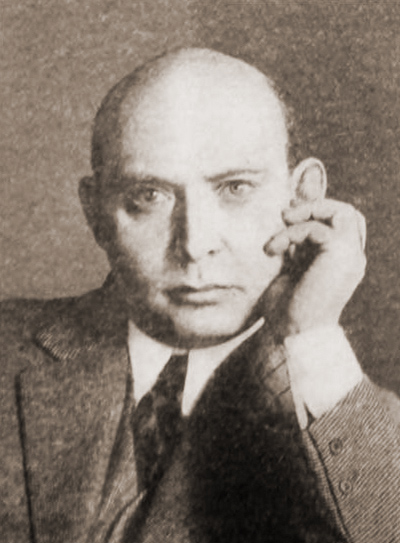
Simeon Strunsky as he appeared in 1914.

Simeon Strunsky (July 23, 1879 – February 5, 1948) was a Russian-born Jewish American essayist and editorialist. He is best remembered as a prominent editorialist for the New York Times for more than two decades.

== Biography ==
=== Early years ===
Simeon Strunsky was born July 23, 1879, in Vitebsk, Belorussia, then part of the Russian Empire and today part of Belarus. His parents were Isidor S. and Perl Wainstein. He graduated from Columbia University, where he was a member of the Philolexian Society, in 1900.

=== Career ===
Strunsky was a department editor of the New International Encyclopedia from 1900 to 1906, editorial writer on the New York Evening Post from 1906 to 1913, and subsequently was literary editor of that paper until 1920.

Strunsky's columns also appeared in Atlantic Monthly, Bookman, Collier's, and Harper's Weekly. He wrote:

- Through the Outlooking Glass with Theodore Roosevelt (1912)
- The Patient Observer (1911)
- Belshazzar Court, or Village Life in New York City (1914): "The simplicity and kindliness of human nature...in the complexities of the modern city".
- Post-Impressions (1914)
- Little Journeys Towards Paris. By W. Hohenzollern. (1918)

Strunsky joined the New York Times in 1924 and was on staff until his death in Princeton, New Jersey, after three months of hospitalization. He was married to Socialist activist and historian Manya Gordon; they had a son and a daughter. He had a son, Robert Strunsky, by his first wife, Rebecca Slobodkin (d. 1906).

Strunsky's most notable contributions to the Times were his editorial-page essays titled "Topics of the Times." Although it now competes with such departments as "Editorial Observer" and is infrequently seen nowadays, "Topics of the Times" remains a popular feature of the paper.

=== Death and legacy ===
Simeon Strunsky died on February 5, 1948, aged 68.

== Books ==
- " Sinbad And His Friends." Henry Holt And Company, 1921.
- King Akhnaton. Longmans, Green & Co., 1928.
- "No Mean City" E.P.Dutton and Company Inc., 1944
