= Economy of the Soviet Union =

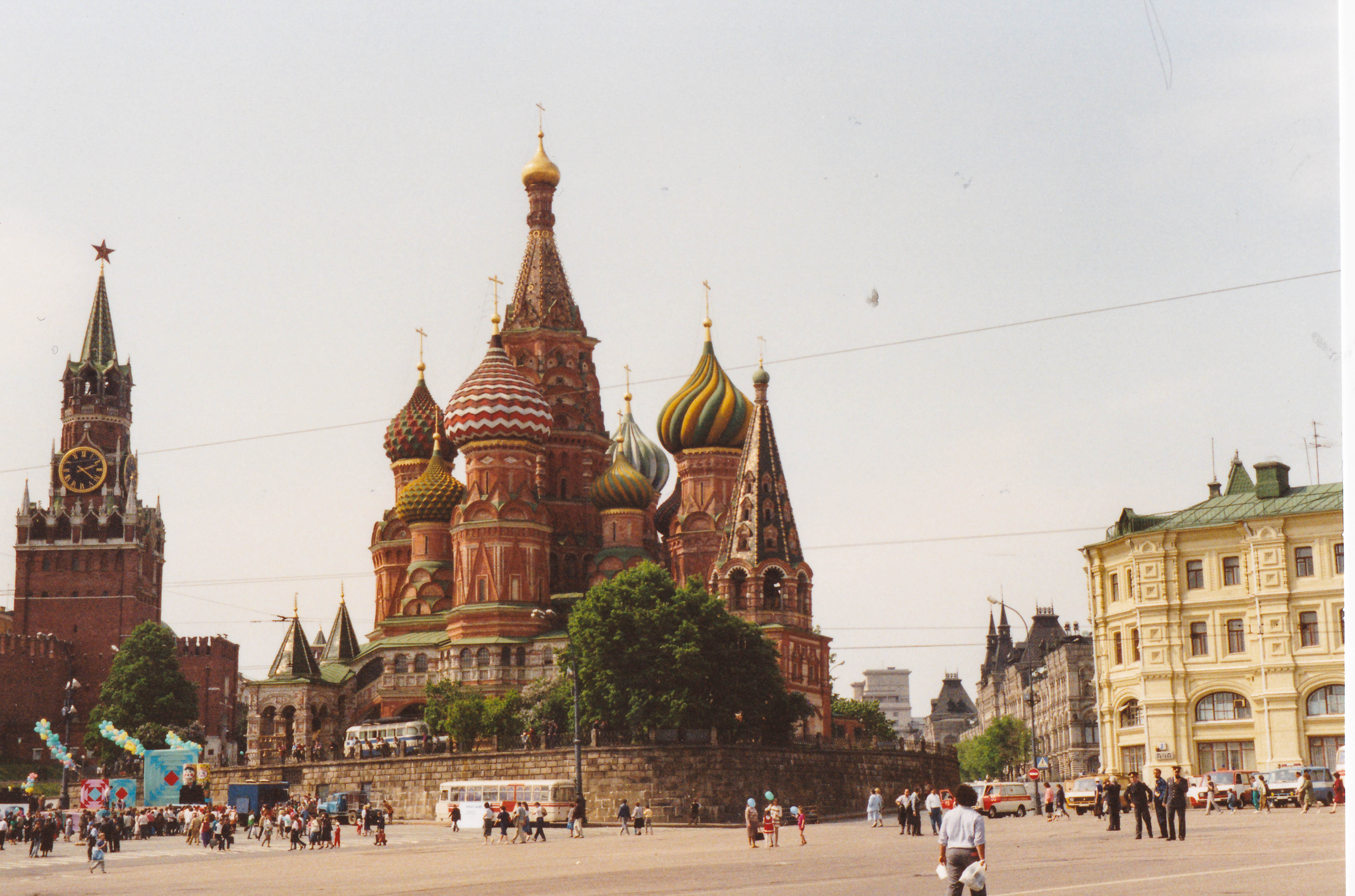
- City center of Moscow in 1991
- Currency: Rouble (SUR)
- Fiscal year: 1 January–31 December (calendar year)
- Trade organisations: Comecon, ESCAP and others

Statistics
- GDP: руб 1.053 trillion (US$1.780 trillion official exchange rate, US$585 billion commercial-adjusted exchange rate, US$2.660 trillion in PPP) (1990, 1989 for PPP)
- GDP growth: 4.7% (1980-1985) 2.9% (1986-1990)
- GDP per capita: руб 3,672 (US$ 6,208 official exchange rate, US$ 2,040 commercial-adjusted exchange rate, US$9,211 in PPP) (1990, 1989 for PPP)
- Inflation (CPI): 14% (43rd) (in 1991) 3.1% (in 1980)
- Population below national poverty line: 14% of population (1989 est.); 12% of population (1991 est.)
- Gini coefficient: 0.290 (1980 est.); 0.275 (1989 est.)
- Labour force: 152.3 million (3rd) (1989 est.)
- Labour force by occupation: 80% in industry and other non-agricultural sectors; 20% in agriculture (1989 est.)
- Unemployment: 1–2% (1990 est.)
- Main industries: Petroleum, steel, motor vehicles, aerospace, machinery, telecommunications, chemicals, heavy industries, electronics, food processing, lumber, mining and defense (1989 est.)

External
- Exports: $124.7 billion (9th) (1989 est.)
- Export goods: Petroleum and petroleum products, natural gas, metals, wood, machinery, agricultural products and a wide variety of manufactured goods (1989 est.)
- Main export partners: Eastern Bloc 49%, European Community 14%, Cuba 5%, United States, Afghanistan (1988 est.)
- Imports: $114.7 billion (10th) (1989 est.)
- Import goods: Grain and other agricultural products, machinery and equipment, steel products (including large-diameter pipe), consumer manufactures
- Main import partners: Eastern Bloc 54%, European Community 11%, Cuba, China, United States (1988 est.)
- Gross external debt: $55 billion (11th) (1989 est.) $27.3 billion (1988 est.)

Public finance
- Revenue: $422 billion (5th) (1990 est.)
- Spending: $510 billion (1989 est.) $53 million (2nd; capital expenditures) (1991 est.)
- Economic aid: $147.6 billion (1954–1988)
- All values, unless otherwise stated, are in US dollars.

The economy of the Soviet Union was based on state ownership of the means of production, collective farming, and industrial manufacturing. An administrative-command system managed a distinctive form of central planning. The Soviet economy was second only to the United States and was characterized by state control of investment, prices, a dependence on natural resources, lack of consumer goods, shortages of goods and services, little foreign trade, public ownership of industrial assets, macroeconomic stability, low unemployment and high job security. A 1986 study published in the American Journal of Public Health citing World Bank data claimed that the Soviet model provided a better quality of life and human development than most market economies at comparable levels of economic development.

Beginning in 1928, the course of the economy of the Soviet Union was guided by a series of five-year plans. By the late 1930s, the Soviet Union had rapidly evolved from a mainly agrarian society into a major industrial power. Its transformative capacity meant communism consistently appealed to the intellectuals of developing countries in Asia. Soviet economic writers such as Lev Gatovsky (who participated in the elaboration of the first and second five-year plans) used their economic analysis of this period to praise the effectiveness of the October Revolution.

The growth rates during the first three five-year plans (1928–1940) are particularly notable given that this period is nearly congruent with the Great Depression. During this period, the Soviet Union saw substantial industrial growth while other regions were suffering from crisis. The White House National Security Council of the United States described the continuing growth as a "proven ability to carry backward countries speedily through the crisis of modernization and industrialization", but the impoverished base upon which the five-year plans sought to build meant that at the commencement of Operation Barbarossa on 22 June 1941 the country was still poor.

The Soviet Union had the second largest economy in the world from the start of World War II until the mid-1980s. A significant aspect of Soviet economy was its dependence on its enormous supply of oil and gas, which became much more valuable as exports after the world price of oil skyrocketed in the 1970s. As Daniel Yergin notes, the Soviet economy in its final decades was "heavily dependent on vast natural resources–oil and gas in particular". During the 1980s, the Reagan administration used the global energy market against the USSR. At the request of CIA Director Bill Casey, Saudi Arabia intentionally flooded the market with oil to crash prices and drain Soviet foreign currency reserves. World oil prices collapsed in 1986, putting heavy pressure on the economy, a move later described by a former CIA chief of staff as a "body blow to the Soviets. It was the equivalent of stepping on their oxygen tube."

During the era in which the Soviet economy was publicly owned and planned (1928–1989), the Soviet Union’s GDP per capita growth outpaced nearly all other world economies, trailing only Japan, South Korea, and Taiwan. Data shows that Soviet per capita growth expanded by a factor of (5.2), exceeding the growth rates of Western Europe (4.0), and the USA, Canada, Australia and New Zealand (3.3). Ultimately, the Soviet model of public ownership raised average incomes more than the leading industrialized market economies of the 20th century.

The complex demands of the modern economy somewhat constrained the central planners. Data fiddling became common practice among the bureaucracy by reporting fulfilled targets and quotas, thus entrenching the crisis. From the Stalin-era to the early Brezhnev-era, the Soviet economy grew slower than Japan and faster than the United States. GDP levels in 1950 (in billion 1990 dollars) were 510 (100%) in the Soviet Union, 161 (100%) in Japan and 1,456 (100%) in the United States. By 1965, the corresponding values were 1,011 (198%), 587 (365%) and 2,607 (179%). The Soviet Union maintained itself as the world's second largest economy in both nominal and purchasing power parity values throughout the Cold War, until 1990 when Japan's economy exceeded $3 trillion in nominal value.

However, in most cases, this did not correspond to better access to resources and ultimately many other countries outperformed the Soviet Union in terms of social and economic gains. Shortages of goods and services were commonplace due to the planned nature of its economy.

After Mikhail Gorbachev became the General Secretary of the Communist Party of the Soviet Union and came to power in March 1985, he began a process of economic liberalization by dismantling the command economy and moving towards a mixed economy modeled after Lenin's New Economic Policy. The Chernobyl disaster beginning on 26 April 1986 was the costliest disaster in human history. At its dissolution at the end of 1991, the Soviet Union bequeathed its successor state, the Russian Federation, with a growing pile of $66 billion in external debt and barely a few billion dollars in net gold and foreign exchange reserves.

The Soviet Union's relatively medium consumer sector accounted for just 60% of the country's GDP in 1990 while the industrial and agricultural sectors contributed 22% and 20% respectively in 1991. Agriculture was the predominant occupation in the Soviet Union before the massive industrialization under Soviet general secretary Joseph Stalin. The service sector was of low importance in the Soviet Union, with the majority of the labor force employed in the industrial sector. The labor force totaled 152.3 million people. Though its GDP crossed $1 trillion in the 1970s and $2 trillion in the 1980s, the effects of central planning were progressively distorted due to the growth of the black market informal second economy in the Soviet Union.

== Planning ==
Based on a system of state ownership, the Soviet economy was managed through Gosplan (the State Planning Commission), Gosbank (the State Bank) and the Gossnab (State Commission for Materials and Equipment Supply). Beginning in 1928, the economy was directed by a series of five-year plans, with a brief attempt at seven-year planning. For every enterprise, planning ministries (also known as the "fund holders" or fondoderzhateli) defined the mix of economic inputs (e.g. labor and raw materials), a schedule for completion, all wholesale prices and almost all retail prices. The planning process was based around material balances—balancing economic inputs with planned output targets for the planning period. From 1930 until the late 1950s, the range of mathematics used to assist economic decision-making was, for ideological reasons, extremely restricted. On the whole, the plans were overoptimistic and plagued by falsified reporting.

After 1928, the industry was long concentrated on the production of capital goods through metallurgy, machine manufacture, and chemical industry. In Soviet terminology, goods were known as capital. This emphasis was based on the perceived necessity for very fast industrialization and modernization of the Soviet Union. After the death of Joseph Stalin in 1953, consumer goods (group B goods) received somewhat more emphasis due to the efforts of Georgy Malenkov. However, when Khrushchev consolidated his power by sacking Malenkov, one of the accusations against him was that he permitted "theoretically incorrect and politically harmful opposition to the rate of development of heavy industry in favor of the rate of development of light and food industry". Since 1955, the priorities were again given to capital goods, which was expressed in the decisions of the 20th Congress of the Communist Party of the Soviet Union (CPSU) in 1956.

In 1959, economist Naum Jasny wrote that while many of the official statistics were correctly reported:

The fact is that the most important official general indices of economic development – those of national income, industrial output, real incomes of wage-earners and peasants, labour productivity and production costs in industry – have, over long periods of time....nothing in common with reality.

Most information in the Soviet economy flowed from the top down. There were several mechanisms in place for producers and consumers to provide input and information that would help in the drafting of economic plans (as detailed below), but the political climate was such that few people ever provided negative input or criticism of the plan and thus Soviet planners had very little reliable feedback that they could use to determine the success of their plans. This meant that economic planning was often done based on faulty or outdated information, particularly in sectors with large numbers of consumers. As a result, some goods tended to be underproduced and led to shortages while other goods were overproduced and accumulated in storage. Low-level managers often did not report such problems to their superiors, relying instead on each other for support. Some factories developed a system of barter and either exchanged or shared raw materials and parts without the knowledge of the authorities and outside the parameters of the economic plan.

Heavy industry was always the focus of the Soviet economy even in its later years. The fact that it received special attention from the planners, combined with the fact that industrial production was relatively easy to plan even without minute feedback, led to significant growth in that sector. The Soviet Union became one of the leading industrial nations of the world. Industrial production was disproportionately high in the Soviet Union compared to Western economies. By the 60s calorie consumption per person in the Soviet Union was at levels similar to the United States. However, the production of consumer goods was disproportionately low. Economic planners made little effort to determine the wishes of household consumers, resulting in severe shortages of many consumer goods. Whenever these consumer goods would become available on the market, consumers routinely had to stand in long lines (queues) to buy them. A black market developed for goods such as cigarettes that were particularly sought after, but it constantly underproduced. People were developing unique social "networks of favors" between people having access to sought after goods (for example, working in particular shops or factories).

=== Drafting the five-year plans ===
Under Joseph Stalin's close supervision, a complex system of planning arrangements had developed since the introduction of the first five-year plan in 1928. Preceding this, Leon Trotsky had delivered a joint report to the April Plenum of the Central Committee in 1926 which proposed a program for national industrialisation and the replacement of annual plans with five-year plans. His proposals were rejected by the Central Committee majority which was controlled by the troika and derided by Stalin at the time. Stalin's version of the five-year plan was implemented in 1928 and took effect until 1932. According to historian Sheila Fitzpatrick, the scholarly consensus was that Stalin appropriated the position of the Left Opposition on such matters as industrialisation and collectivisation. Comparatively, Trotsky believed that planning and N.E.P should develop within a mixed framework until the socialist sector gradually superseded the private industry.

Until the late 1980s and early 1990s, when economic reforms backed by Soviet leader Mikhail Gorbachev introduced significant changes in the traditional system (see perestroika), the allocation of resources was directed by a planning apparatus rather than through the interplay of market forces.

==== Time frame ====
From the Stalin era through the late 1980s, the five-year plan integrated short-range planning into a longer time frame. It delineated the chief thrust of the country's economic development and specified the way the economy could meet the desired goals of the Communist Party of the Soviet Union (CPSU). Although the five-year plan was enacted into law, it contained a series of guidelines rather than a set of direct orders.

Periods covered by the five-year plans coincided with those covered by the gatherings of the CPSU Party Congress. At each CPSU Congress, the party leadership presented the targets for the next five-year plan, therefore each plan had the approval of the most authoritative body of the country's leading political institution.

==== Guidelines for the plan ====
The Central Committee of the CPSU and more specifically its Politburo set basic guidelines for planning. The Politburo determined the general direction of the economy via control figures (preliminary plan targets), major investment projects (capacity creation) and general economic policies. These guidelines were submitted as a report of the Central Committee to the Congress of the CPSU to be approved there. After the approval at the Congress, the list of priorities for the five-year plan was processed by the Council of Ministers, which constituted the government of the Soviet Union. The Council of Ministers was composed of industrial ministers, chairmen of various state committees and chairmen of agencies with ministerial status. This committee stood at the apex of the vast economic administration, including the state planning apparatus, the industrial ministries, the trusts (the intermediate level between the ministries and the enterprises) and finally the enterprises. The Council of Ministers elaborated on Politburo plan targets and sent them to Gosplan, which gathered data on plan fulfillment.

==== Gosplan ====
Combining the broad objectives set by the Council of Ministers with data from lower administrative levels about the current state of the economy, Gosplan developed preliminary plan targets through a process of trial and error. Among the more than twenty state committees, Gosplan was the most important agency in the economic administration, heading the government’s planning apparatus. The planners’ primary task was to balance resources and requirements, ensuring that the necessary inputs were available for the planned output. The planning system itself was a vast organizational structure, consisting of councils, commissions, government officials, and specialists responsible for implementing and monitoring economic policy.

Gosplan was internally divided into industrial departments—such as coal, iron, and machine building—as well as summary departments, like finance, which addressed cross-sectoral issues. Except for a brief experiment with regional planning during the Khrushchev era in the 1950s, Soviet planning remained sector-based rather than regional. The departments within Gosplan contributed to the development of comprehensive plan targets and input requirements, a process that involved negotiation between ministries and their superiors.

Economic ministries played a central role in the Soviet administrative system. Once Gosplan finalized the planning goals, these ministries prepared plans within their specific jurisdictions and distributed planning data to subordinate enterprises. This data moved downward through the planning hierarchy, becoming increasingly detailed. Each ministry received control targets, which were then broken down by branches and further subdivided by lower units, until each enterprise was assigned its own production targets.

Enterprises were called upon to develop in the final period of state planning in the late 1980s and early 1990s (even though such participation was mostly limited to a rubber-stamping of prepared statements during huge pre-staged meetings). The enterprises' draft plans were then sent back up through the planning ministries for review. This process entailed intensive bargaining, with all parties seeking the target levels and input figures that best suited their interests.

After this bargaining process, Gosplan received the revised estimates and re-aggregated them as it saw fit. The redrafted plan was then sent to the Council of Ministers and the party's Politburo and Central Committee Secretariat for approval. The Council of Ministers submitted the plan to the Supreme Soviet of the Soviet Union and the Central Committee submitted the plan to the party congress, both for rubber stamp approval. By this time, the process had been completed and the plan became law.

The review, revision and approval of the five-year plan were followed by another downward flow of information, this time with the amended and final plans containing the specific targets for each sector of the economy. Implementation began at this point and was largely the responsibility of enterprise managers.

The national state budget was prepared by the Ministry of Finance of the Soviet Union by negotiating with its all-Union local organizations. If the state budget was accepted by the Soviet Union, it was then adopted.

According to a number of scholars both inside and outside of USSR, it was specifically Soviet-type economic planning combined with political dogmatism which led to gradual degradation of Soviet economy and its collapse.

== Agriculture ==
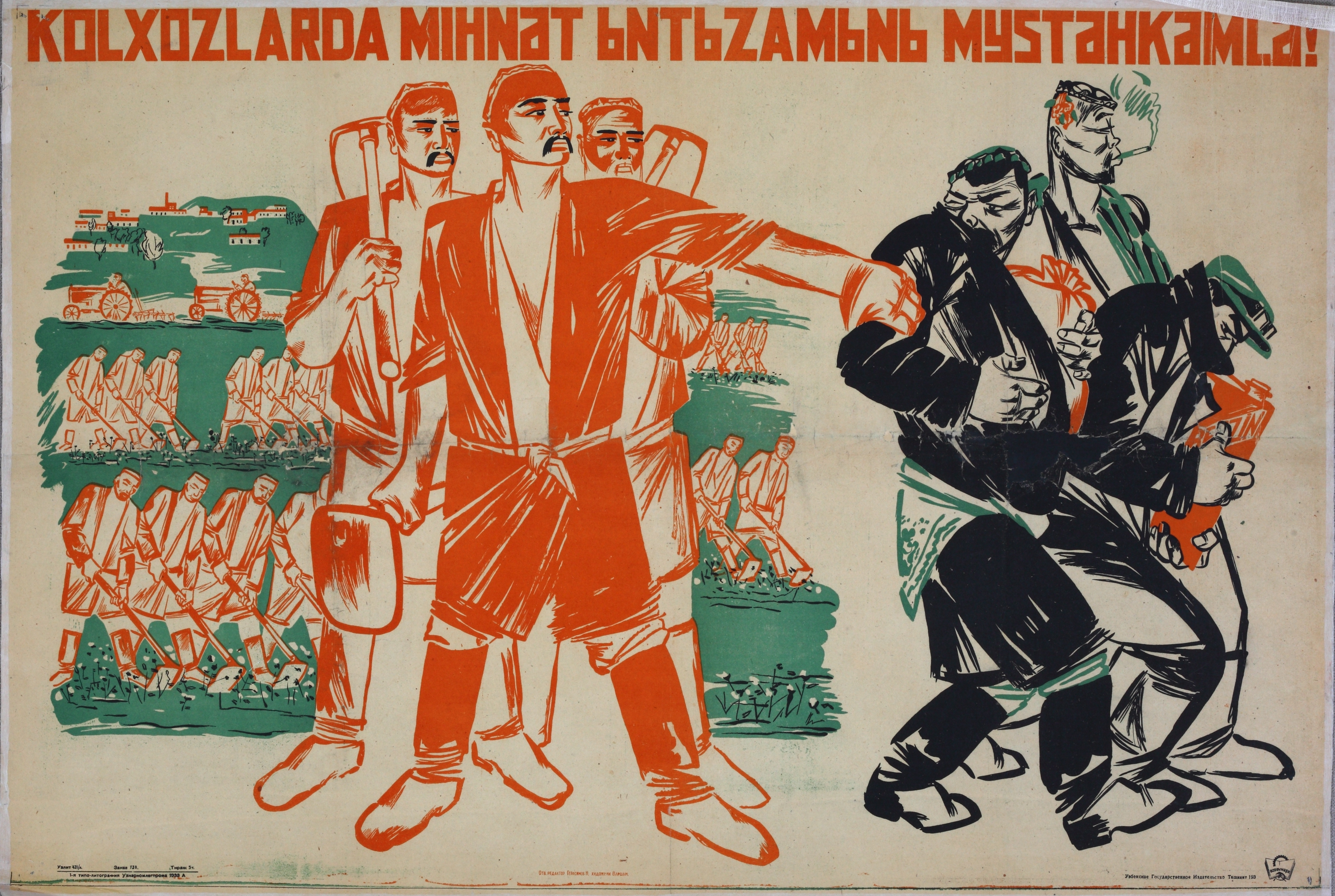
"Strengthen working discipline in collective farms", a Soviet propaganda poster issued in Uzbekistan, 1933

In the USSR, agriculture was organized into a system of collective farms (kolkhozes) and state farms (sovkhozes). These farms were collectivized distributed amongst the peasantry and yearly production quotas were set by administrators. Before Stalin, Soviet agriculture held its own. Data from the 1920s infers a positive supply response to increases in the terms of trade. Farmers increased grain sales to urban areas when the price of grain increased. However, at the time, agricultural production was limited by technology, as the whole of Soviet Agriculture relied heavily on animal powered tilling. In the 1930s due to massive famines and animal die-offs, the number of remaining animals doing farm work was reduced by half. This indicated the dire need of additional production outputs, which administrators predicted could be supplied by mechanical harvesters. The planning of Soviet leadership emphasized a mechanical agricultural industry, whereby technology and ideology met to create a booming agricultural industry. This way, the technological evolution of Soviet agricultural production could be linked to urban industry. Yet in reality, Soviet planners were more invested in industry than farmers, and the Soviet agricultural industry suffered as a result. An example of this can be seen in the analysis published in 1929 by soviet economist Lev Gatovsky regarding government intervention on the grain market.

Leon Trotsky and the Opposition bloc had advocated a programme of industrialization which also proposed agricultural cooperatives and the formation of collective farms on a voluntary basis. Several scholars have argued that the economic programme of Trotsky differed from the forced policy of collectivisation implemented by Stalin after 1928 due to the levels of brutality associated with its enforcement.

Stalin's first Five year Plan (1929–1933) was a colossal failure. It is a subject of debate whether collectivization caused the Soviet famine of 1930–1933 that killed 5.7 to 8.7 million people. During a mass famine in Soviet Ukraine from 1932 to 1933 (Holodomor), millions of Ukrainians starved. Soviet population declined after 1933, and would see modest growth until 1936. The figures suggest a gap of about 15 million people between anticipated population and those that survived the five-year plan. Systemic inefficiencies plagued Soviet agriculture, such as obsolete technology, waste of fuel resources, and depreciating capital stock. These inefficiencies clogged the Soviet agricultural machine and reduced output. Additionally, climate greatly affected Soviet agricultural output. Many regions throughout the USSR had little rainfall, short growing seasons, low temperatures, and general extremes unsuitable for optimal agricultural production. This was detrimental to agricultural output and prevented cost minimization. When harvests fell short of production quotas due to a sudden frost or long drought, Soviet output could not make up the difference. Consequently, when agriculture was not producing as promised, some peasants refused to work over fear of starvation. However, since Soviet farms were collectivized, no individual grievances could be tolerated for the societal system to succeed. As a result, peasants unwilling to join kolkhozy were forced off of their land, which was then redistributed to other peasants.

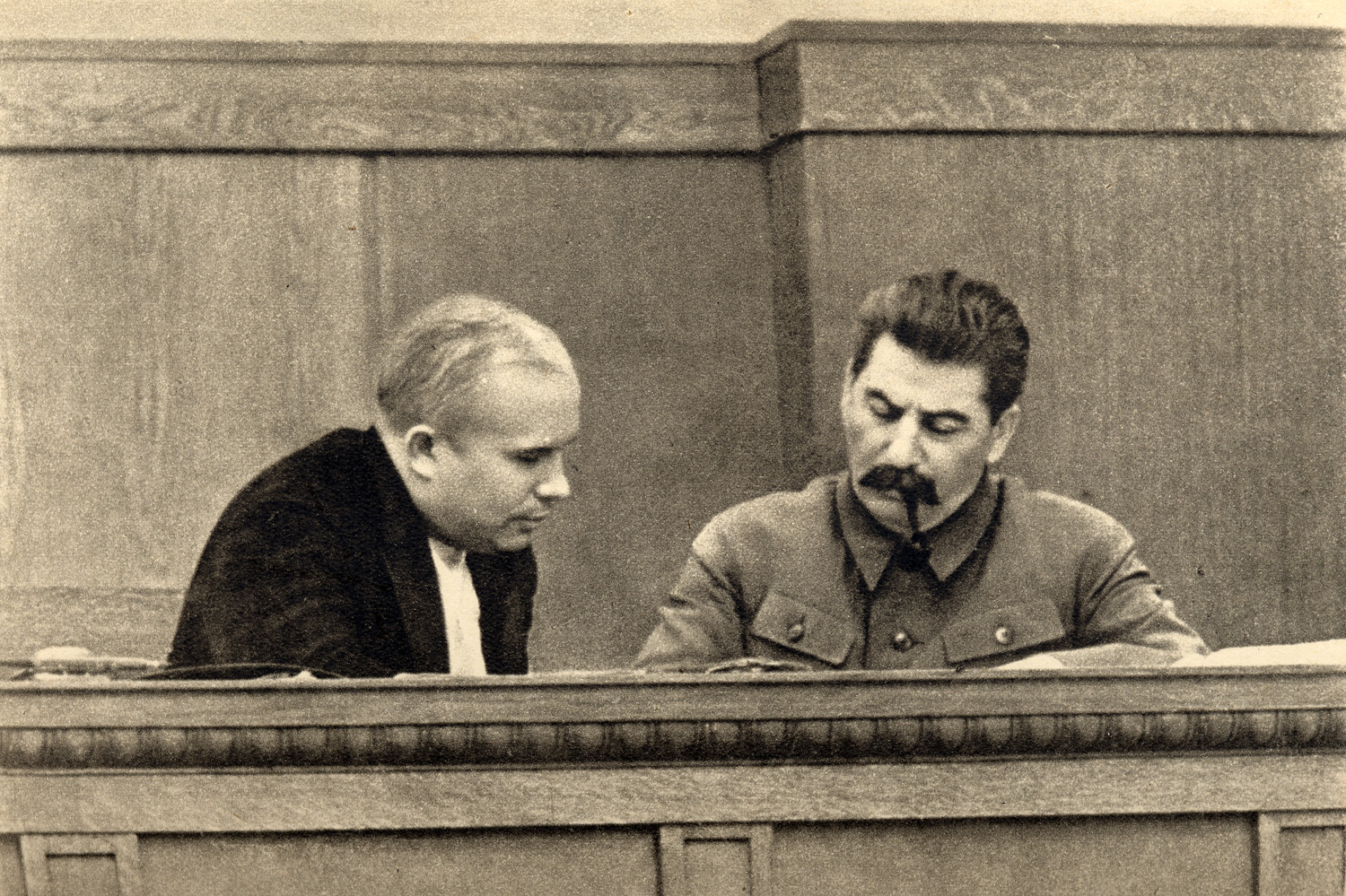
Nikita Khrushchev and Joseph Stalin, 1936

After Stalin's death in 1953, Khrushchev abandoned Stalin's agricultural model following previous agricultural failures. He instead looked comparatively at American agriculture through Soviet observers. He noticed that American agriculture flourished due to its specialization and interdependence on other farmers for goods and services. Similarly, Soviet farms could specialize in the crop which was best suited for growing in their region, and surplus could be transported throughout the USSR to satisfy quotas and distribute to people who needed the food. Khrushchev himself tended to suggest his favorite crops such as corn for planters. Paired with a need to proselytize mechanized agriculture to nearby countries, the Khrushchev administration began a campaign for an optimistic future of mechanized Soviet agriculture. However, Khrushchev was not able to fulfill his promises, and this contributed to his rising unpopularity which culminated in his removal from power in 1964.

Following Khrushchev's leadership, Soviet agriculture's legacy was defined by patchwork that attempted to fix the mistakes of the previous administrations. Crop harvests, tractors, fertilizer, and capital investment were all increasing since 1955. By 1965, the output of the Soviet worker was increasing, but still well below average for a developed country. Problems such as a scarcity of educated workers, saturation of unskilled workers and jobs made obsolete by technology, and poorly trained and educated farmers brought costs up and drove production down. These issues prevented the Soviet Union from producing enough food, as a lack of administration and management led to the mismanagement of farms and reduced worker productivity. From 1972 to 1986, the Soviet Union failed to produce more wheat than the Western European average. This failure to produce resulted in forced Soviet imports of food. Between 1961 and 1985, Soviet food imports from foreign producers cost a total of nearly 152 billion dollars. The root of this expense can be identified in the inefficiencies of the Soviet agricultural sector, such as the shortage of workers, lag in technology, or natural factors such as drought or frosts. Although the Soviet Union aimed to establish a mechanized agricultural giant, the shortcomings of Soviet agriculture put the sector behind other countries from the beginning. Soviet agriculture had the inability to meet basic consumer demands and expectations, requiring policy change culminating in the dissolution of the USSR in 1991.

== Foreign trade and currency ==
Largely self-sufficient, the Soviet Union traded little in comparison to its economic strength. However, trade with non-communist countries increased in the 1970s as the government sought to compensate gaps in domestic production with imports.

In general, fuels, metals and timber were exported, while consumer goods and sometimes grain were imported. In the 1980s, trade with the Council for Mutual Economic Assistance (COMECON) member states accounted for about half the country's volume of trade.

The Soviet ruble was non-convertible after 1932 (when trade in gold-convertible chervonets, introduced by Lenin in the New Economic Policy years, was suspended) until the late 1980s. It was impossible (both for citizens and state-owned businesses) to freely buy or sell foreign currency even though the "exchange rate" was set and published regularly. Buying or selling foreign currency on a black market was a serious crime until the late 1980s. Individuals who were paid from abroad (for example writers whose books were published abroad) normally had to spend their currency in a foreign-currency-only chain of state-owned Beryozka ("Birch-tree") stores. Once a free conversion of currency was allowed, the exchange rate plummeted from its official values by almost a factor of 10.

Overall, the banking system was highly centralized and fully controlled by a single state-owned Gosbank, responsive to the fulfillment of the government's economic plans. Soviet banks furnished short-term credit to state-owned enterprises.

== Forms of property ==
There were two basic forms of property in the Soviet Union: individual property and collective property. These differed greatly in their content and legal status. According to communist theory, capital (means of production) should not be individually owned, with certain negligible exceptions. In particular, after the end of a short period of the New Economic Policy and with collectivization completed, all industrial property and virtually all land were collective.

Land in rural areas was allotted for housing and some sustenance farming, and persons had certain rights to it, but it was not their property in full. In particular, in kolkhozes and sovkhozes there was a practice to rotate individual farming lots with collective lots. This resulted in situations where people would ameliorate, till and cultivate their lots carefully, adapting them to small-scale farming and in 5–7 years those lots would be swapped for kolkhoz ones, typically with exhausted soil due to intensive, large-scale agriculture. There was an extremely small number of remaining individual farmsteads (khutors; хутор), located in isolated rural areas in the Baltic states, Ukraine, Siberia and cossack lands.

=== Individual property ===
To distinguish "capitalist" and "socialist" types of property ownership further, two different forms of individual property were recognized: private property (частная собственность, chastnaya sobstvennost) and personal property (личная собственность, lichnaya sobstvennost). The former encompassed capital (means of production) while the latter described everything else in a person's possession.

=== Collective property ===
There were several forms of collective ownership, the most significant being state property, kolkhoz property and cooperative property. The most common forms of cooperative property were housing cooperatives (жилищные кооперативы) in urban areas, consumer cooperatives (потребительская кооперация, потребкооперация) and rural consumer societies (сельские потребительские общества, сельпо).

== History ==
GDP per capita in the former USSR, 1922 to 1991

=== Early development ===
Both the Russian Soviet Federative Socialist Republic and later the Soviet Union were developing countries in the process of industrialization. For both, this development occurred slowly and from a low initial starting-point. Because of World War I (1914–1918), the Russian Revolution of 1917 and the ensuing Russian Civil War (1917–1922), industrial production had only managed to barely recover its 1913 level by 1926. By this time, about 18% of the population lived in non-rural areas, although only about 7.5% were employed in the non-agricultural sector. The remainder remained stuck in low-productivity agriculture.

David A. Dyker saw the Soviet Union of circa 1930 as in some ways a typical developing country, characterized by low capital-investment and with most of its population residing in the countryside. Part of the reason for low investment-rates lay in the inability to acquire capital from abroad. This in turn, resulted from the repudiation of the debts of the Russian Empire by the Bolsheviks in 1918 as well as from the worldwide financial troubles. Consequently, any kind of economic growth had to be financed by domestic savings.

The economic problems in agriculture were further exacerbated by natural conditions, such as long cold winters across the country, droughts in the south and acidic soils in the north. However, according to Dyker, the Soviet economy did have "extremely good" potential in the area of raw materials and mineral extraction, for example in the oil fields in Transcaucasia, and this, along with a small but growing manufacturing base, helped the Soviet Union avoid any kind of balance of payments problems.

=== New Economic Policy (1921–1929) ===
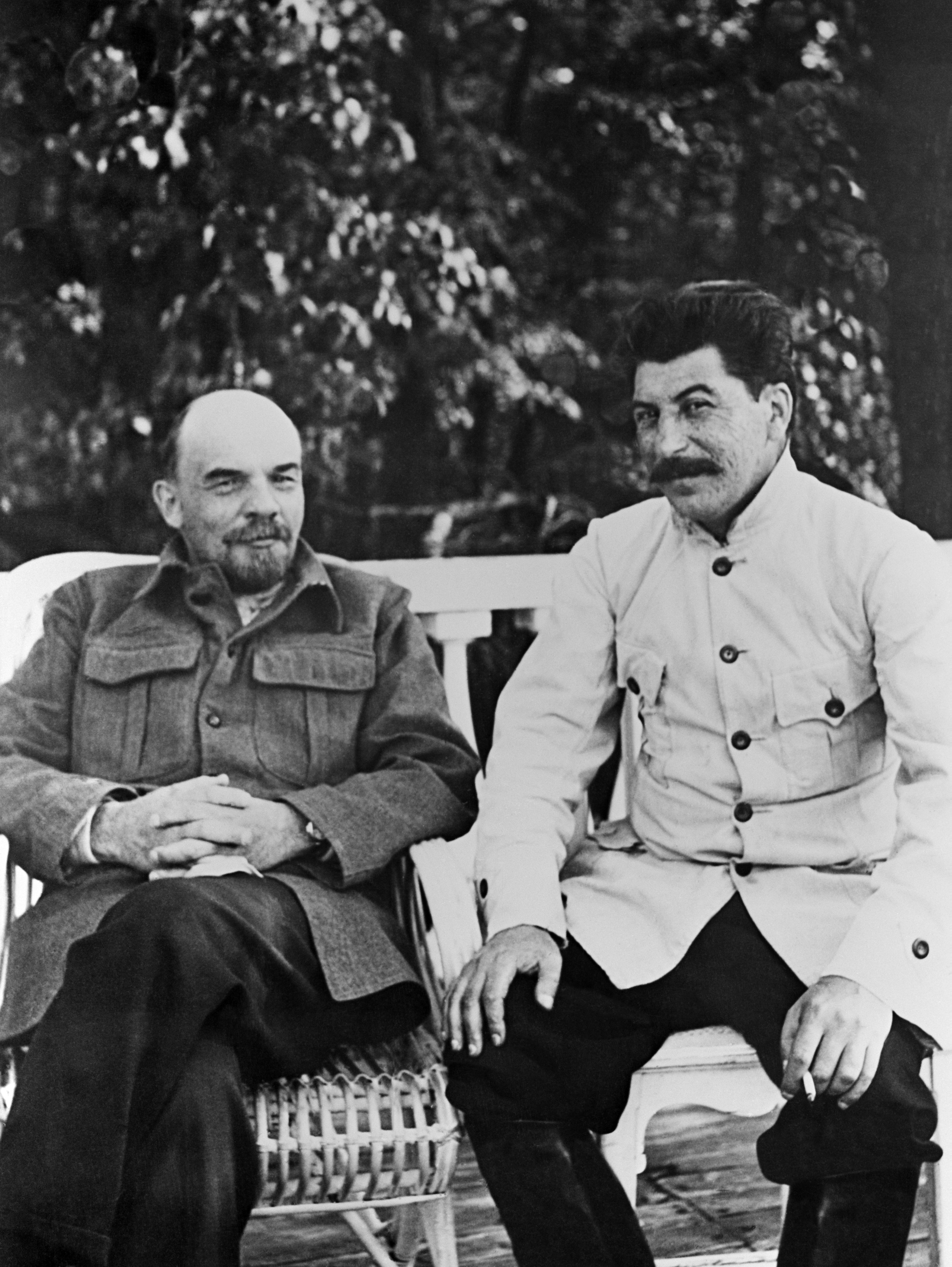
One of the several photographs intended to show the two major economic policy makers of the Soviet Union together, Vladimir Lenin (left) who created the NEP and Joseph Stalin (right) who created the command economy

By early 1921, it became apparent to the Bolsheviks that forced requisitioning of grain had resulted in low agricultural production and widespread opposition. As a result, Lenin and the Politburo decided to try an alternative approach. The so-called New Economic Policy (NEP) was approved at the 10th Congress of the Russian Communist Party (Bolsheviks).

Everything except "the commanding heights", as Lenin put it, of the economy would be privatized. The commanding heights included foreign trade, heavy industry, communication and transport among others. In practice this limited the private sector to artisan and agricultural production/trade. The NEP encountered strong resistance within the Bolshevik party. Lenin had to persuade communist skeptics that "state capitalism" was a necessary step in achieving communism, while he himself harbored suspicions that the policy could be abused by private businessmen ("NEPmen").

As novelist Andrei Platonov, among others, noted, the improvements were immediate. Rationing cards and queues, which had become hallmarks of war communism, had disappeared. However, due to prolonged war, low harvests, and several natural disasters the Soviet economy was still in trouble, particularly its agricultural sector. In 1921, widespread famine broke out in the Volga-Ural region. The Soviet government changed its previous course and allowed international relief to come in from abroad, and established a special committee chaired by prominent communists and non-communists alike. Despite this, an estimated five million people died in the famine.

=== Armenian Soviet Socialist Republic ===
The Soviet-era republic's centralized economy forbade private ownership of property with an income. Privately owned farms in the Armenian SSR were collectivized and put under the control of the state starting in the late 1920s, however this was frequently met with vigorous opposition by the peasantry. During the same period (1929–1936), Armenia's industrialization process was also launched by the government. The socialist economic system and socialist ownership of the means of production, which come in two forms: state property and cooperative and collective-farm property, form the basis of the republic's economy. The legislation authorizes small private ventures of individual peasants and craftsmen based on their own labor and forbids the exploitation of the labor of others, in addition to the socialist system of economy, which is the major type of economy in the Republic. The official economic plan sets and directs the Republic's economic course. By 1935, the gross product of agriculture was 132% higher than that of 1928, and the gross product of industry was 650% more than that of 1928. However, the 1930s economic revolution came at a high price: it destroyed the conventional peasant family and village institution and caused many people who lived in the remote countryside to relocate to cities. As private enterprise was essentially brought under government control, it came to an end.

=== Stalinism ===
Starting in 1928, the five-year plans began building a heavy industrial base at once in an underdeveloped economy without waiting years for capital to accumulate through the expansion of light industry, and without reliance on external financing. The New Economic Policy was rapidly abandoned and replaced by Stalinist economics, including Collectivisation. The country now became industrialized at a hitherto unprecedented pace, surpassing Germany's pace of industrialization in the 19th century and Japan's earlier in the 20th century.

After the reconstruction of the economy in the wake of the destruction caused by the Russian Civil War was completed and after the initial plans of further industrialization were fulfilled, the explosive growth slowed down until the period of Brezhnev stagnation in the 1970s and 1980s.

Leon Trotsky maintained that the disproportions and imbalances which became characteristic of Stalinist planning in the 1930s such as the underdeveloped consumer base along with the priority focus on heavy industry were due to a number of avoidable problems. He argued that the industrial drive had been enacted under more severe circumstances, several years later and in a less rational manner than proposal originally conceived by the Left Opposition.

Led by the creation of NAMI and by the GAZ copy of the Ford Model A in 1929, industrialization came with the extension of medical services, which improved labor productivity. Campaigns were carried out against typhus, cholera and malaria; the number of physicians increased as rapidly as facilities and training would permit; and death and infant mortality rates steadily decreased.

In 1947 the Politburo announced a monetary reform that was intended to confiscate "excessive" wealth in order to weaken illegal trade and shore up the government budget.

Ration stamps in the Soviet Union were abolished in December 1947, six months after rationing ended in the US, and two years before France. The Soviet famine of 1946–1947 was ongoing, and lasted for some months after.

=== 1930–1970 ===
The State Quality Mark of the Soviet Union, introduced in 1967, was used to certify that goods met quality standards and to improve the efficiency of production.

As weighed growth rates, economic planning performed well during the early and mid-1930s, World War II-era mobilization, and for the first two decades of the postwar era. The Soviet Union became the world's leading producer of oil, coal, iron ore and cement; manganese, gold, natural gas and other minerals were also of major importance. However, the Soviet authorities suppressed information about the Soviet famine of 1932–1933 until perestroika.

To some estimations, in 1933 workers' real earnings sank on more than 11.4% from 1926 level, though it needs an adjustment due to elimination of unemployment and perks at work (such as inexpensive meals). Common and political prisoners in labor camps (Gulag) were forced to do unpaid labor and communists and Komsomol members were frequently "mobilized" for various construction projects. The German invasion during World War II inflicted punishing blows to the economy of the Soviet Union, with Soviet GDP falling 34% between 1940 and 1942. Industrial output did not recover to its 1940 level for almost a decade.

In 1961, a new redenominated Soviet rouble was issued with an exchange rate of £1 = Rbl 1. The rouble maintained exchange parity with sterling until the dissolution of the Soviet Union in 1991. After a new leadership, headed by Leonid Brezhnev, had come to power, attempts were made to revitalize the economy through economic reform. Starting in 1965, enterprises and organizations were made to rely on economic methods of profitable production, rather than follow orders from the state administration. By 1970, the Soviet economy had reached its zenith and was estimated at 60 percent of the size of the United States in terms of the estimated commodities (like steel and coal). In 1989, the official GDP of the Soviet Union was $2,500 billion while the GDP of the United States was $4,862 billion with per capita income figures as $8,700 and $19,800 respectively.

The USSR was the first major non-Western country to close the developmental gap that had existed with the West since the 16th century. In the period 1930 to 1960s, the USSR successfully implemented catch-up development.

=== 1970–1990 ===
After 1976, the USSR stopped narrowing the developmental gap with the West, and the gap further widened beginning in 1990.

The value of all consumer goods manufactured in 1972 in retail prices was about 118 billion roubles ($530 billion). The Era of Stagnation in the mid-1970s was triggered by the Nixon Shock and aggravated by the war in Afghanistan in 1979 and led to a period of economic standstill between 1979 and 1985. Soviet military buildup at the expense of domestic development kept the Soviet Union's GDP at the same level during the first half of the 1980s. According to American journalist Scott Shane, the massive quantities of goods produced often did not meet the needs or tastes of consumers.

The volume of decisions facing planners in Moscow became overwhelming. The cumbersome procedures for bureaucratic administration foreclosed the free communication and flexible response required at the enterprise level for dealing with worker alienation, innovation, customers, and suppliers. During 1975–1985, data fiddling became common practice among bureaucracy to report satisfied targets and quotas thus entrenching the crisis. At the same time, the effects of the central planning were progressively distorted due to the rapid growth of the second economy in the Soviet Union.

Soviet national income 1928–1987 growth in % based on estimates of the official statistical agency of the Soviet Union, the CIA and revised estimates by Grigorii Khanin

While all modernized economies were rapidly moving to computerization after 1965, the Soviet Union fell further and further behind. Even though Moscow decided to copy the IBM 360 of 1965, it had enormous difficulties in manufacturing the necessary chips reliably and in quantity, in programming workable and efficient programs, in coordinating entirely separate operations, and in providing support to computer users.

One of the greatest strengths of Soviet economy was its vast supplies of oil and gas; world oil prices quadrupled in the 1973–1974 and rose again in 1979–1981, making the energy sector the chief driver of the Soviet economy, and was used to cover multiple weaknesses. At one point, Soviet Premier Alexei Kosygin told the head of oil and gas production that "things are bad with bread. Give me 3 million tons [of oil] over the plan".

In 2007, economist and former Prime Minister Yegor Gaidar wrote the following about looking back to these three decades:

The hard currency from oil exports stopped the growing food supply crisis, increased the import of equipment and consumer goods, ensured a financial base for the arms race and the achievement of nuclear parity with the United States, and permitted the realization of such risky foreign-policy actions as the war in Afghanistan.

Awareness of the growing crisis arose initially within the KGB which with its extensive network of informants in every region and institution had its finger on the pulse of the nation. Yuri Andropov, director of the KGB, created a secret department during the 1970s within the KGB devoted to economic analysis and when he succeeded Brezhnev in 1982 sounded the alarm forcefully to the Soviet leadership. However, Andropov's remedy of increased discipline proved ineffective. It was only when Andropov's protege Gorbachev assumed power that a determined, but ultimately unsuccessful, assault on the economic crisis was undertaken.

The value of all consumer goods manufactured in 1990 in retail prices was about 459 billion roubles ($2.1 trillion). According to CIA estimates, by 1989 the size of the Soviet economy was roughly half that in the United States.

Sector (distribution of Soviet workforce)	1940	1965	1970	1979	1984
Primary (agriculture and forestry)	54%	31%	25%	21%	20%
Secondary (including construction, transport and communication)	28%	44%	46%	48%	47%
Tertiary (including trade, finance, health, education, science and administration)	18%	25%	29%	31%	33%
Total	100%	100%	100%	100%	100%

== Comparisons with other countries ==
GDP per capita (1990 Int$) comparison involving the area of Russia/USSR, United States, and Western Europe from 1820 to 1990
	USSR/Russia	United States	Western Europe	USSR as a % of United States	USSR as a % of Western Europe
1820	689	1,257	1,232	55	56
1870	943	2,445	1,974	39	48
1913	1,488	5,301	3,473	28	43
1950	2,834	9,561	4,594	30	62
1973	6,058	16,689	11,534	36	53
1990	6,871	23,214	15,988	30	43

Evolution of GNP in comparison with European powers (in millions of dollars of 1960)
Country	1890	1900	1913	1925	1938
Russia/Soviet Union	21,180	32,000	52,420	32,600	75,964
Germany	26,454	35,800	49,760	45,002	77,178
United Kingdom	29,441	36,273	44,074	43,700	56,102
France	19,758	23,500	27,401	36,262	39,284

Comparison between the economies of the Soviet Union and the United States (1989) according to 1990 CIA World Factbook data
	Soviet Union	United States
GDP (GNP) (1989; millions $)	2,659,500	5,233,300
Population (July 1990)	290,938,469	250,410,000
GDP per capita (GNP) ($)	9,211	21,082
Labor force (1989)	152,300,000	125,557,000

== See also ==
- Economy of Russia
- Second economy of the Soviet Union
- 1965 Soviet economic reform
- 1973 Soviet economic reform
- 1979 Soviet economic reform
- Bibliography of the Russian Revolution and Civil War § Economy
- Bibliography of Stalinism and the Soviet Union § Economy
- Bibliography of the Post Stalinist Soviet Union § Economy
- Banking in the Soviet Union
- Bureaucratic collectivism
- Administrative command economy
- Eastern Bloc economies
- Five-year plans
- Forced labor in the Soviet Union
- State Planning Committee
- Material balance planning
- Soviet Ministry of Finance
- New Soviet man – Archetype of the ideal Soviet citizen
- Primitive socialist accumulation
- Soviet-type economic planning
- State capitalism
- State socialism
- Trade unions in the Soviet Union
- Military budget of the Soviet Union
