= Communist Party of Estonia (1990) =

Estonian political party

Communist Party of Estonia Eestimaa Kommunistlik Partei
- Leader: Enn-Arno Sillari
- Founded: 26 March 1990
- Banned: 22 August 1991
- Split from: Communist Party of Estonia
- Ideology: Communism; Marxism-Leninism; Left-conservatism; Soviet patriotism
- Regional affiliation: UCP–CPSU
- International affiliation: IMCWP

The Communist Party of Estonia (CPSU) (Estonian: Eestimaa Kommunistlik Partei; Russian: Коммунистическая партия Эстонии, romanized: Kommunisticheskaya partiya Estonii) was a political party in Estonia. The party was initially known as Communist Party of Estonia (on CPSU platform) (EKP (NLKP platvormil)), and was formed in 1990 through a split in the original Communist Party of Estonia (EKP). The split occurred at the 20th congress of EKP in March 1990, as a reaction against the decision of the congress to separate EKP from the Communist Party of the Soviet Union and rebrand itself into the Estonian Democratic Labour Party (EDTP). Immediately after the independence decision of EKP, the pro-Soviet delegates left the congress venue. The convened their own rival 20th congress on March 26, 1990. EKP (NLKP platvormil) elected its own Central Committee, headed by its First Secretary Alexander Gusev, and would function as a separate party from EKP.

The party was often perceived, along with Intermovement, as representing the resistance of the Russian population in Estonia against independence. However unlike the split in the Communist Party of Latvia, the split in EKP did not follow ethnic lines. A study on the electoral patterns of the 1990 Estonian Supreme Soviet election showed that the EKP (NLKP platvormil) candidates had a support of 13.3% of the non-Estonian voters. Notably, when the split in EKP occurred in 1990 party units in Russian-dominated towns like Narva, Sillamäe and Kohtla-Järve decided to retain their membership in EKP rather than joining EKP (NLKP platvormil).

Unlike the analogous split in the Communist Party of Latvia, EKP (NLKP platvormil) failed to gain control over any major portion of the resources and personnel of the EKP after the split. On 20 June 1990 the name of the party was changed to Communist Party of Estonia (CPSU) (EKP (NLKP)).

EKP (NLKP) held its 21st Party Congress in the fall of 1990 (counting the twenty party congresses of EKP as theirs). The congress elected Lembit Annus, as the new First Secretary. With the new leadership followed a less confrontational approach that its Latvian counterpart. In April 1991 Annus expressed willingness to enter a coalition government in Estonia.

Parallel to the March 3, 1991, referendum on Estonian independence, the party organized a referendum of its own. The vote took place in the cities of Kohtla-Järve, Sillamäe and Narva. The question of the referendum was "Do you want the sovereign Estonia to remain within the composition of the USSR?" Unlike the main referendum, all residents (including Soviet troops) could take part. Only the results from Sillamäe were made public, with a turnout of 83%. 89% of the voters in Sillamäe had voted yes in the referendum.

== Activities ==
The party supported the August 1991 Soviet coup. Following the defeat of the coup, the party was declared illegal by the Estonian government on August 22, 1991. At the time Central Committee secretary of the party was Pavel Panfilov.

After the ban, some former members covertly created the Communist Party of Estonia to continue the cause. Initially their grouping was affiliated with the Union of Communist Parties – Communist Party of the Soviet Union (SKP-KPSS), but when SKP-KPSS split in 2001 they joined the Communist Party of the Soviet Union of Oleg Shenin. The party carried out a congress in 1999, and elected a Central Committee.
