= Alexander Prokhanov =

Georgian-born Russian writer and journalist (born 1938)

- Александр Андреевич Проханов
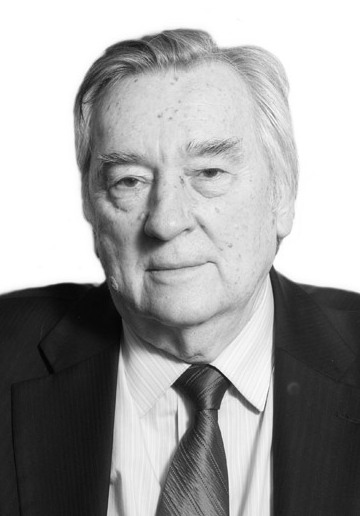
- Born: 26 February 1938 (age 88); Tbilisi, Georgian SSR, Soviet Union
- Education: Moscow Aviation Institute
- Occupations: Writer, chief editor
- Writing career
- Language: Russian
- Period: Contemporary
- Genres: Novel; novella; short story; sketch; script; essay; opinion journalism; editorial
- Movements: Socialist realism; Russian postmodernism
- Alexander Prokhanov's voice Prokhanov on the Echo of Moscow program, 5 July 2014

Alexander Andreyevich Prokhanov (Russian: Александр Андреевич Проханов; born 26 February 1938) is a Russian writer, a member of the secretariat of the Writers Union of the Russian Federation, and the author of more than 30 novels and short story collections. He is the editor-in-chief of Russia's extreme-right (or radical-reactionary) newspaper Zavtra (Завтра, Tomorrow), that combines ultranationalist and anti-capitalist views.

== Early life ==
Alexander Prokhanov was born in Tbilisi, Soviet Georgia, to which his ancestors, members of the Russian Christian "Molokan" sect, had been deported by Catherine the Great. His grand-uncle Ivan Prokhanov was a leader of the All-Russian Union of Evangelical Christians (1908–1928) and the one-time vice-President of the Baptist World Alliance who left the USSR in 1928 and died as an emigré.

In 1955, Prokhanov enrolled into the Moscow Aviation Institute where for the first time he started to write poetry and prose. After the graduation he worked as an engineer at a Ministry of Defense factory, then, in 1962–1964, as a forester in Karelia and the Moscow Oblast. In the late 1960s he started writing essays and reports for numerous magazines (Krugozor, Smena, Selskaya Molodyozh), later citing Andrei Platonov and Vladimir Nabokov as major influences.

== Career ==
Prokhanov's short story "The Wedding" (1967) garnered some critical praise and is considered his breakthrough. Two years later, he was working for the Soviet newspapers, Pravda and Literaturnaya Gazeta. As a foreign correspondent, Prokhanov visited Afghanistan, Nicaragua, Cambodia, Angola, and Ethiopia, these assignments providing him with material for future literary work. Prokhanov was the first to report on the March 1969 events on Damansky Island during the Sino-Soviet border conflict.

In 1971, his first book I Am Going My Way was published. His literary mentor Yury Trifonov provided a foreword for it. Prokhanov later remembered: "He liked the expressiveness, experiments with language, the flow of metaphors, my naive youthful pantheism. ... But my first social-oriented novellas made him skeptical, his tone became tougher and he entrusted me with another patron, Vladimir Makanin, who was my good friend at the time."

In 1972, Prokhanov became a member of the Union of Soviet Writers. In the mid-1980s, he was an active contributor to Molodaya Gvardiya, Nash Sovremennik, and the newspaper Literaturnaya Rossiya. In 1990, Prokhanov emerged as a candidate for the post of Literaturnaya Gazeta's editor-in-chief, but the staff ignored him, preferring Fyodor Burlatsky, Mikhail Gorbachev's protégé. In 1989–1991, Prokhanov worked as the editor-in-chief of Sovetskaya Literatura, a magazine published in nine languages in more than one hundred countries. Enjoying his reputation of a hard-line communist, he never joined the Communist Party of the Soviet Union.

In December 1990 (while still head of Sovetskaya Literatura), Prokhanov founded Den (День, Day), and became its editor-in-chief. Initially an organ of the Union of Soviet Writers, in the summer of 1991, Den moved under the patronage of the Union of Writers of Russia. Sporting the subheading "Organ of the spiritual opposition", it became arguably the most radical Russian newspaper continually challenging Boris Yeltsin and his team of liberal reformers. Regarded by Prokhanov as the "patriotic alternative" to pro-liberal, nomenclature-led Literaturnaya Gazeta, Den managed to attract authors from the conflicting flanks of the Russian opposition movement, united by their hatred of the liberal reforms but divided in their attitude towards Communism. Among them were ultra-nationalists, whose publications caused outrage, several Jewish organizations condemning Den as antisemitic.

It was Prokhanov who, in July 1991, wrote the text of "A Word to the People", a political open letter subsequently signed by Gennady Zyuganov, Vasily Starodubtsev, Igor Shafarevich, Valentin Rasputin, Valentin Varennikov, and Eduard Volodin among others. The document calling for the formation of a united "patriotic front" was seen, in retrospect, as an ideological platform for the failed August coup d'etat attempt. The publication of the manifest brought about the rift between Prokhanov and General Alexander Rutskoy (whom he once helped to be rescued from captivity in Afghanistan and later backed his election campaign). The latter, speaking on Russian TV, promised his former friend "ten years in jail."

During the failed August 1991 coup, Prokhanov supported the junta calling itself the State Committee on the State of Emergency. In 1992, he joined the National Salvation Front's leadership, alongside Gennady Zyuganov, Nikolai Pavlov, Mikhail Astafyev and Igor Shafarevich, among others. The same year he created the Day Movement in an attempt to turn his newspaper's readership into a political force. During the September 1993 Russian constitutional crisis, Den became a mouthpiece for the radical opposition and Prokhanov gained notoriety as a harsh critic of Yeltsin. After the Russian Parliament's demise in October that year, Den was banned by the Russian Ministry of Justice. The newspaper re-emerged as Zavtra on 5 November 1993.

For the rest of the 1990s, Prokhanov felt persecuted and marginalized. "Even in Soviet times I had the reputation of an 'ode-singer to the State', they called me 'the Army Headquarters' Nightingale'. Now in all of their [new] dictionaries I've got demonized. While my friends, like Anatoly Kim, emerged as the aesthetes, I have been presented as an obscurantist. They advised Western publishers against translating me, putting me under blockade," Prokhanov complained, speaking to Zakhar Prilepin. This situation changed in the early 2000s when Prokhanov found himself among the Russian literary elite, even if his prose was getting increasingly morbid, surreal and apocalyptic. As the 1999 terrorist attacks upon residential houses shocked Russia, Prokhanov accused the state secret services in plotting these attacks and based his next novel upon these suspicions. In 2002, Mr. Hexogen (2001) brought him the National Bestseller Award.

In the mid-2000s, writing several books a year (including numerous re-makes of his best-known 20th-century work), Prokhanov became an omnipresent character of the Russian media, frequenting TV talk shows and disputes as a token "opposition's spiritual leader". Since 2003, he has been a regular guest of Vladimir Solovyov's prime time political shows On the Stand and Duel. From 2007–2014, Prokhanov had a one-hour weekly slot at the pro-liberal Echo of Moscow radio station. Another station he has contributing to since 2009 is the Russian News Service where he has two one-hour programs a week. In 2013–2014, he appeared regularly at the Russia-24 TV channel with his "Replika" ("A Comment") slot.

=== Works ===
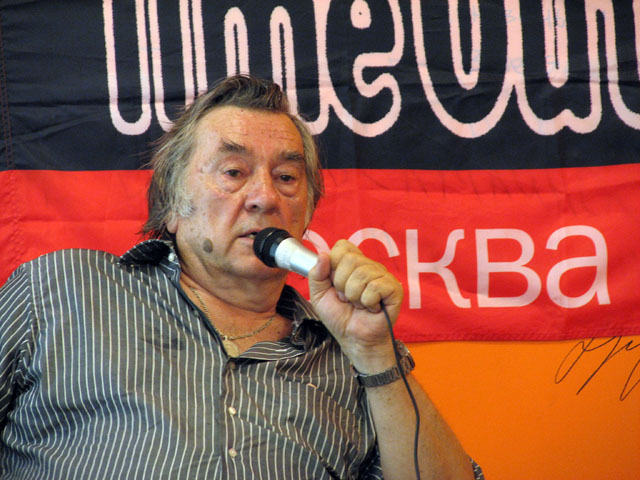
Prokhanov on 14 June 2007, presenting the book Beyond the Rublyovka Fences.

Prokhanov debuted with a short story collection I Am Going My Way (1971), starting out as a proponent of the Village Prose movement, portraying the life of the ordinary Soviet villagers obsessed with keeping the old traditions and customs going. "The theme of Russia and Russian people for Prokhanov is not a vogue, but part of his very soul; this young author's prose is incredibly sincere," Yury Trifonov commented in a foreword. It was followed by The Unburnt Blossom (1972), the collection of sketches from the Soviet country life, and The Grass Gets Yellow (1974), a collection of stories and novellas much in the same vein.

Prokhanov's first novel The Nomadic Rose (1975) dealt with the Soviet life in Siberia and Russian Far East which he had travelled over extensively by this time. The Time is Noon (1977), The Locale (1979) and The Eternal City (1981) continued exploring the technological progress versus nature theme.

In the 1980s, Prokhanov moved into the field of war and politics, using his vast foreign correspondent experience. The Tree in the Center of Kabul (1982), the Campuchea chronicles Hunter of the Isles (1983), the Africanist (1984) and the Nicaraguan epic And Then Comes the Wind (1984) formed "The Burning Gardens" tetralogy, all four novels characterized by dynamic action, over-the-top style of language and idealized, heroic protagonists. The Afghan War was the subject of his next two novels, Drawings of a Batalist (1986) and 600 Years After the Battle (1988).

Among Prokhanov's well-known work of the time were novellas "Polina" (1976), "The Unseen Corn" (1976), "By The Moon-Ray", "Snow and Coal" (both 1977), "Grey-Haired Soldier" (1985), and "The Armourer (1986), as well as short novels The Admiral (1983) and Lighter Than Asure (1986). Prokhanov's 1989 novella "The Muslim Wedding" brought him The Anton Chekhov Prize (for the Story of the Year).

According to critic P.V.Bekedin, everything that has been written by Prokhanov since 1991 goes under the heading "the literature of Russian resistance." The Last Soldier of the Empire (1993) told the story of the 1991 Coup and the demise of the USSR. Brown-Red (1999), a surreal portrayal of the nightmarish events of 3–4 October 1993, has been defined by Prokhanov himself as "the Catechism of resistance."

In the 1990s, Prokhanov made several journeys to Chechnya and a series of Chechen War-themed books followed, writer Yuri Bondarev calling The Chechen Blues (1998) the best book Prokhanov has ever written. "Filling those pages I felt like I was painting frescos, with soldiers as angels and saints, BTRs and tanks for horses and halos," Prokhanov said in an interview. It was followed by Those Marching Through the Night (2001), the novel on the second Chechen campaign, highlighting the author's belief that Russians and Chechens were two brother nations destined to live in peace and love but torn apart by enemies from abroad.

Mr. Hexogen (2001), a surrealist thriller telling the story of a joint Russian secret services and oligarchs' plot aimed at wiping out the existing political elite via blowing up houses, has been compared to Dostoevsky's Demons. In May 2002, the novel brought him the National Bestseller Prize. In 2003, the post-modernist satire, The Cruiser Sonata, came out, its exclusive edition's 500 copies illustrated by the author himself in his favorite lubok style. "Avant-garde has finally got to Prokhanov," commented Kommersant critic Irina Kulik.

His 2005 novel Political Scientist featured a character named Dyshlov, a thinly veiled caricature of Zyuganov whom Prokhanov has been completely disillusioned with recently and holds responsible for the inefficiency of the Russian left. Speaking of this novel, poet and novelist Dmitry Bykov remarked: "Prokhanov is an immensely gifted writer, yet his prose is but a puke."

Prokhanov's 2012 book, The Tread of the Russian Triumph (2012) is a fictionalized treatise on Russian history promoting the author's very own "Fifth Empire" doctrine stating that the current Eurasian Economic Union has already started to evolve into a new geo-political giant, the successor to the four previous Empires: Kievan Rus'/Novgorod Republic, Moscovy, the Romanovs' Russian Empire, and Stalin's USSR. "There will be a place for everyone in it: the left and the right, Orthodox Christians and Muslim fundamentalists, synagogues and big business... like the Bolsheviks used the potential of the Romanov Empire, the Fifth Empire is to be composed of all kinds of disparate elements," he commented.

=== Accolades ===
==== State awards ====
- Lenin Komsomol Prize (1982)
- Order of the Red Banner (1984)
- Order of the Badge of Honour
- Order of the Red Star

==== Literary awards ====
- The Konstantin Fedin Award (1980)
- The USSR Ministry of Defense Literary Prize (1988)
- The International Mikhail Sholokhov Prize (1998)
- National Bestseller Prize (2002)
- The Bunin Prize (2009)
- The All-Russian Nikolai Leskov Prize (2012)
- The Golden Delvig (Literaturnaya Gazeta Prize, 2013)

== Political activism ==
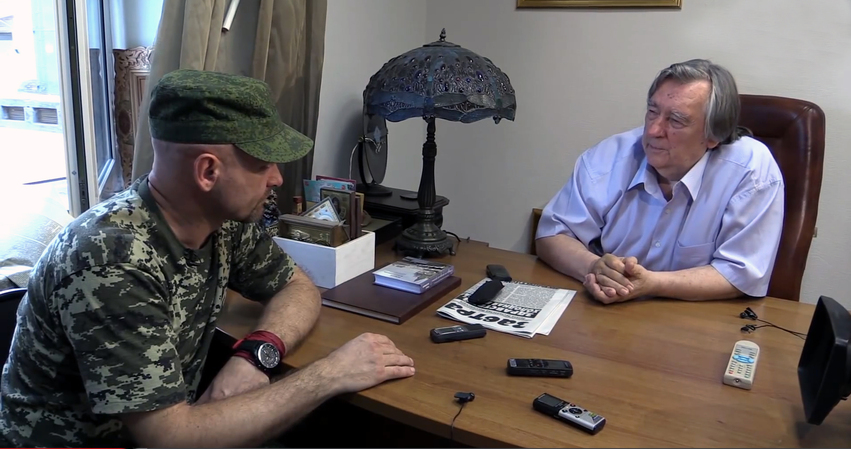
Prokhanov with Aleksey Mozgovoy, the Lugansk militia leader. 7 August 2014

A controversial figure, Prokhanov is seen in Russia by some as an original author sporting "a rare combination of postmodernist ethics and imperialist agenda," and by others as a purveyor of extremist nationalistic views which formed the ideological platform of Zavtra, the ultra-conservative newspaper he's been the leader of since 1993. Another Russian ultra-nationalist, Aleksandr Dugin, credited Prokhanov with being "the godfather of the New Russia opposition movement" even if deploring his refusal to take a more active part in it and choosing instead to back up political figures Dugin referred to as "the Staraya Square monsters".

In 1991, during the Russian Soviet Federative Socialist Republic presidential election, Prokhanov worked for the campaign of General Albert Makashov, an ultra-conservative candidate. In September 1992, Prokhanov was one of the initiators of the National Salvation Front, of which— until April 1994— he was a co-chairman. In September 1994, as one of the organizers of the All-Russian Congress of Patriotic Forces, Prokhanov was among those who signed the petition demanding the President's resignation.

In July 1991, he signed the open letter, "A Word to the People", sometimes considered a program for the August coup makers. During the failed August 1991 coup, Prokhanov supported the State Committee on the State of Emergency. In the summer of 1992, Prokhanov formed the so-called "Day Movement", as an attempt to turn the newspaper's readership into a political movement.

On 4 October 1993, the Ministry of Justice of Russia ordered a stop to the editorial and publishing activity of the newspaper Day; its office was raided by OMON, archive files and property was confiscated, staff members were physically assaulted. On the same day, after the Supreme Soviet's defenders' defeat, Prokhanov went into hiding in the woods on the outskirts of Ryazan. A week later he managed to publish several issues of Den in Minsk. In November 1993, Prokhanov's son-in-law Alexander Khudorozhkov registered the newspaper Zavtra (Tomorrow). Prokhanov became its editor-in-chief.

In the 1996 Russian presidential election, Prokhanov supported the leader of the Communist Party of the Russian Federation, Gennady Zyuganov. In 1997, he co-founded the Agency of Patriotic Information. Twice (in 1997 and 1999), he was physically assaulted, the first of these accidents ending with him hospitalized, suffering severe concussion.

In 1999, together with Konstantin Kasimovsky, Prokhanov invited former klansman David Duke to visit the Russian Federation.

In 2003, Prokhanov, Boris Berezovsky, and Viktor Alksnis issued a joint statement concerning the Nord Ost terrorist attack, blaming the Russian authorities for the heavy loss of life and accusing Vladimir Putin of inefficiency. Also in 2003, Berezovsky and Prokhanov issued another joint memorandum, this time blaming the authorities for the murder of Sergei Yushenkov, and warning the people against the "great dangers coming from the Kremlin."

His newspaper, Zavtra, had supported the Communist Party of the Russian Federation since the mid-1990s, but in 2005 it switched his support to the Rodina ("Motherland") party. Commenting on the Russian war with Georgia, Prokhanov said that Russia "has not been defeated by the West in the Cold War, because the Cold War continues. We lost gigantic territories, but we held Moscow. From here we launched our counterattack."

Prokhanov founded Izborsky Club, a Eurasian think tank, in 2012.

During the war in Donbas, Prokhanov praised the Prime Minister of the self-proclaimed pro-Russian Donetsk People's Republic Alexander Borodai as a "true White Russian nationalist".

In November 2014, a Russian court ordered Prokhanov to pay 500 thousand rubles to Andrey Makarevich whom he falsely accused (in the Izvestia-published article) of entertaining paratroopers in Sloviansk ("where he was heard by people in basements with broken hands and put out eyes") while the singer in fact performed in Sviatohirsk, singing for refugees.

== Personal life ==
A widower, he has a daughter and two sons. One is the journalist Andrey Fefyolov, who is a member of Zavtra staff. His other son, Vasily, contributes to Zavtra, as a photo correspondent.

== Select bibliography ==
- I Am Going My Way (Иду в путь мой, 1971)
- Letters About the Country (Письма о деревне, 1971)
- The Unburnt Blossom (Неопалимый цвет, 1972)
- The Grass Gets Yellow (Желтеет трава, 1974)
- In Your Name (Во имя твое, 1975)
- Glimpses of Mangazea (Отблески Мангазеи, 1975)
- Nomadic Rose (Кочующая роза, 1976)
- The Time is Noon (Время полдень, 1977)
- The Locale (Место действия, 1980)
- The Eternal City (Вечный город, 1981)
- The Tree in the Center of Kabul (Дерево в центре Кабула, 1982)
- The Isle Hunter (В островах охотник, 1984)
- Burning Gardens (Горящие сады, 1984)
- The Nuclear Shield (Ядерный щит, 1984)
- And Now Comes the Wind (И вот приходит ветер, 1985)
- Lighter Than Asure (Светлей лазури, 1985)
- There in Afghanistan (Там, в Афганистане, 1988)
- A Batalist's Pictures (Рисунки баталиста, 1989)
- Inscriptions Upon Armor (Записки на броне, 1989)
- 600 Years After the Battle (600 лет после битвы, 1989)
- The Empire's Last Soldier (Последний солдат империи, 1993)
- The Angel Passed By (Ангел пролетел, 1994)
- The Palace (Дворец, 1995)
- The Chechen Blues (Чеченский блюз, 1998)
- Brown Red (Красно-коричневый, 1999)
- Those Marching Through the Night (Идущие в ночи, 2001)
- Mr Hexogen (Господин Гексоген, 2002)
- The Cruiser Sonata (Крейсерова соната, 2004)
- The Inscription (Надпись, 2005)
- Political Scientist (Политолог, 2005)
- Grey-Haired Soldier (Седой солдат, 2006)
- The Fifth Empire's Symphony (2006)
- Beyond the Fences of Rublyovka (За оградой Рублёвки, 2007)
- The Fifth Empire (Пятая империя, 2007)
- Friend-Foe (Свой-чужой, 2007)
- The Mould (Холм, 2008)
- The Virtuoso (Виртуоз, 2009)
- The Eye (Око, 2010)
- The Works by Alexander Prokhanov in 15 Volumes (2010)
- The Aluminium Face (Алюминиевое лицо, 2011)
- The Rock-Inscribed Book (Наскальная книга, 2011)
- The Russian (Русский, 2012)
- The Tread of Russian Triumph (Поступь русской победы', 2012)
- The Golden Times (Время золотое, 2013)
