= A Word to the People =

Anti-Yeltsin, anti-Gorbachev open letter from 1991

"A Word to the People" (Russian: «Слово к народу») was an open letter signed by twelve Soviet public figures. The declaration was published in Sovetskaya Rossiya (a newspaper that expressed anti-perestroika views) on 23 July 1991.

The signers included writers Yuri Bondarev, Valentin Rasputin and Alexander Prokhanov, singer Lyudmila Zykina, war generals Valentin Varennikov and Boris Gromov, sculptor Vyacheslav Klykov, scientist Eduard Volodin and politicians Gennady Zyuganov, Vasily Starodubtsev, Yuri Blokhin and Alexander Tizyakov.

The authors of the writing appealed to the citizens of the country, severely criticizing the policies of Mikhail Gorbachev and Boris Yeltsin, and they pleaded to avoid the collapse of the Soviet Union, suggesting the formation of new opposition movements.

An enormous, unforeseen calamity has taken place. Motherland, our land, a great power, given to us to ward with the nature, glorious ancestors, it is perishing, breaking apart, falling into darkness and nonbeing. And this collapse takes place at our silence, toleration and accord.<...>
Brethren, too late are we waking up, are observing the misery when our home is already burning in four corners, when extinguishing this has to be done not by water, but by our own tears and blood. Do we allow for the second time during this century civil discordance and war, again throw ourselves into merciless millstones, set started not by us, that will be grinding the bones of the people, breaking in two the backbone of Russia? <...>
Let us unite, so as to stop the chain reaction of the disastrous collapse of the state, economy, human personality; in order to contribute to the strengthening of the Soviet power, to the transformation of it into a genuinely people's power, and not some manger for the hungry nouveaux riches, who are ready to sell off everything for the sake of their insatiable appetite.<...>
Soviet Union, this is our home and stronghold, built with enormous efforts of all the peoples and nations, that has saved us from disgrace and slavery at the times of hideous invasions! Russia - unique, beloved! - she is crying for help.

According to V. Bondarenko, it was Alexander Prokhanov who wrote the text of the publication. Three of the signatories (Valentin Varennikov, Alexander Tizyakov, and Vasily Starodubtsev) later joined the State Committee on the State of Emergency in the 1991 August Coup attempt against Gorbachev.

The letter has also been regarded as a call to arms on the eve of the August Coup. According to A. James Gregor, the signatories (a number of them active CPSU members) abandoned class war rhetoric, emphasizing rather "a salvation of the Motherland", stressing the priority of patriotism over Soviet Marxist ideology. Two Central Committee members, Otto Latsis and Andrey Grachev, explicitly attacked the publication in their speeches at the plenum, but were heckled and had difficulty in making themselves heard.

Ten years after the publication, on 14 August 2001, Sovetskaya Rossiya published an appeal entitled "Stop reforms of death!" («Остановить "реформы смерти"!»), in which the letter "A Word to the People" was called "prophesying".

== Review ==
Gennady Zyuganov (General Secretary of the Communist Party of the Russian Federation) later noted: "I can remind you that the publication of this collective letter caused a great resonance. In addition, the provokes hate from the authorities side, including Yeltsin and his entourage. We remember how Rutskoy and Yeltsin first called the document 'Yaroslavna's weeping' from the stands and the screens, and then, they threatened the authors with prison." In his memoirs, the ideologist of Perestroika and the former head of the propaganda department of the Central Committee of the CPSU, Alexander Yakovlev, negatively characterized the letter, calling it "demagogy", "a set of evil passages and simultaneously desperate moans of the soul", "vulgar essay" and "ideological program of the August rebels". The poet and publicist Yuri Kublanovsky calls the letter "a symbiotic manifesto of communism and patriotism, signed, alas, by many highly talented cultural figures".

== See also ==
- Letter of Forty-Two
- Architect amidst the Ruins
- August coup
- Gennady Zyuganov
