= Communist Party of Transnistria =

Communist Party of Transnistria – CPSU Коммунистическая партия Приднестровья – КПСС
- Abbreviation: КПП-КПСС, KPP-KPSS
- Leader: Vladimir Gavrilchenko (until 2013)
- Founded: August 1991
- Ideology: Communism; Marxism–Leninism
- Political position: Far-left
- Regional affiliation: CPSU (2001)

The Communist Party of Transnistria – CPSU (Russian: Коммунистическая партия Приднестровья – КПСС, abbreviated КПП-КПСС or KPP-KPSS) is a Marxist-Leninist party in Transnistria, previously led by Vladimir Gavrilchenko.

== Overview ==
The Communist Party of Transnistria – CPSU (preferred abbreviation KPP-KPSS) is considered by the Transnistrian government to be the legal successor to the Communist Party of the Soviet Union in Transnistria. It maintains close contacts with groups in Russia, particularly its namesake Communist Party of the Soviet Union organisation led by Oleg Shenin. It has never been represented in Transnistria's Supreme Council.

It supported independent statehood for Transnistria and initially opposed the administration of Transnistrian president Igor Smirnov. It did not field a candidate in the 2006 presidential election but instead lent its support to Nadezhda Bondarenko, the candidate of the rival Transnistrian Communist Party (PKP), who obtained 8.1% of the vote.

During the presidential elections of 2011, party leader Vladimir Gavrilchenko did not run for president himself. He announced his support for Igor Smirnov instead. He also entered the pro-presidential People's Union, which consisted of 20 different public organizations and civic unions. After results of the first round were announced on 12 December 2011, and it became obvious that acting president Igor Smirnov had lost the election, Gavrilchenko and other supporters of Smirnov appeared at a special meeting of the People's Union. Delegates present called for the results of the election to be nullified, a change in the composition of the Central Elections Commission, and the declaration of a state of emergency in order to keep Smirnov in power. However, Smirnov decided to step down peacefully, and nothing transpired from the demands. On 11 March 2013, Gavrilchenko died at the age of 63.

The KPP-KPSS was opposed to the late PKP leader Oleg Khorzhan, whom the party criticized for making frequent trips to Moldova to meet with Moldovan officials, including the then Moldovan president Igor Dodon in 2017. The party called for the stripping of Khorzhan's parliamentary immunity.
