= Communist Party of Kyrgyzstan =

Communist Party of Kyrgyzstan Кыргызстан Коммунисттик партиясы (Kyrgyz) Коммунистическая партия Киргизстана (Russian)
- Abbreviation: KPK
- Secretary: Klara Ajybekova
- Founded: 29 August 1999
- Split from: Party of Communists of Kyrgyzstan
- Headquarters: Bishkek, Kyrgyzstan
- Ideology: Communism; Marxism–Leninism; Social conservatism
- Political position: Far-left
- International affiliation: World Anti-Imperialist Platform
- Continental affiliation: CPSU (2001)
- Supreme Council: 0 / 90

The Communist Party of Kyrgyzstan (Kyrgyz: Кыргызстан Коммунисттик партиясы; Russian: Коммунистическая партия Кыргызстана) is a Marxist-Leninist party in Kyrgyzstan. It was founded on 21 August 1999, following a split in the Party of Communists of Kyrgyzstan.

KPK did not participate in the 2000 parliamentary elections. It publishes Kommunisty Kyrgyzstana.

The party is affiliated to the Communist Party of the Soviet Union of Oleg Shenin.
