= Architect amidst the Ruins =

Open letter by Gennady Zyuganov to Alexander Yakovlev

Architect amidst the Ruins (Russian: Архитектор у развалин, other versions: Архитектор развалин - 'The Architect of the Ruins', Архитектору развалины - 'To the Architect of the Ruins') was an open letter by Gennady Zyuganov, then a relatively little known party functionary who later became the leader of the Communist Party of the Russian Federation, to Alexander Yakovlev, the ideological founder of perestroika who was also known as the "architect of perestroika".

== History ==
The letter was published in the hardline communist newspaper Sovetskaya Rossiya on 7 May 1991. The letter argued that perestroika caused disintegration of the state; democratization resulted in a "war of legislation"; glasnost turned out to be a weapon in the psychological war against the Soviet people; and a new alliance of obscurantists, lumpen intelligentsia, and criminals was coming into being.

The letter was perceived as the start of the campaign to overthrow Mikhail Gorbachev. It was later reported by Oleg Shenin that the text itself had been written by a KGB team, and Zyuganov's signature just suited the goals.
