= Lembit Annus =

Soviet Estonian politician (1941–2018)

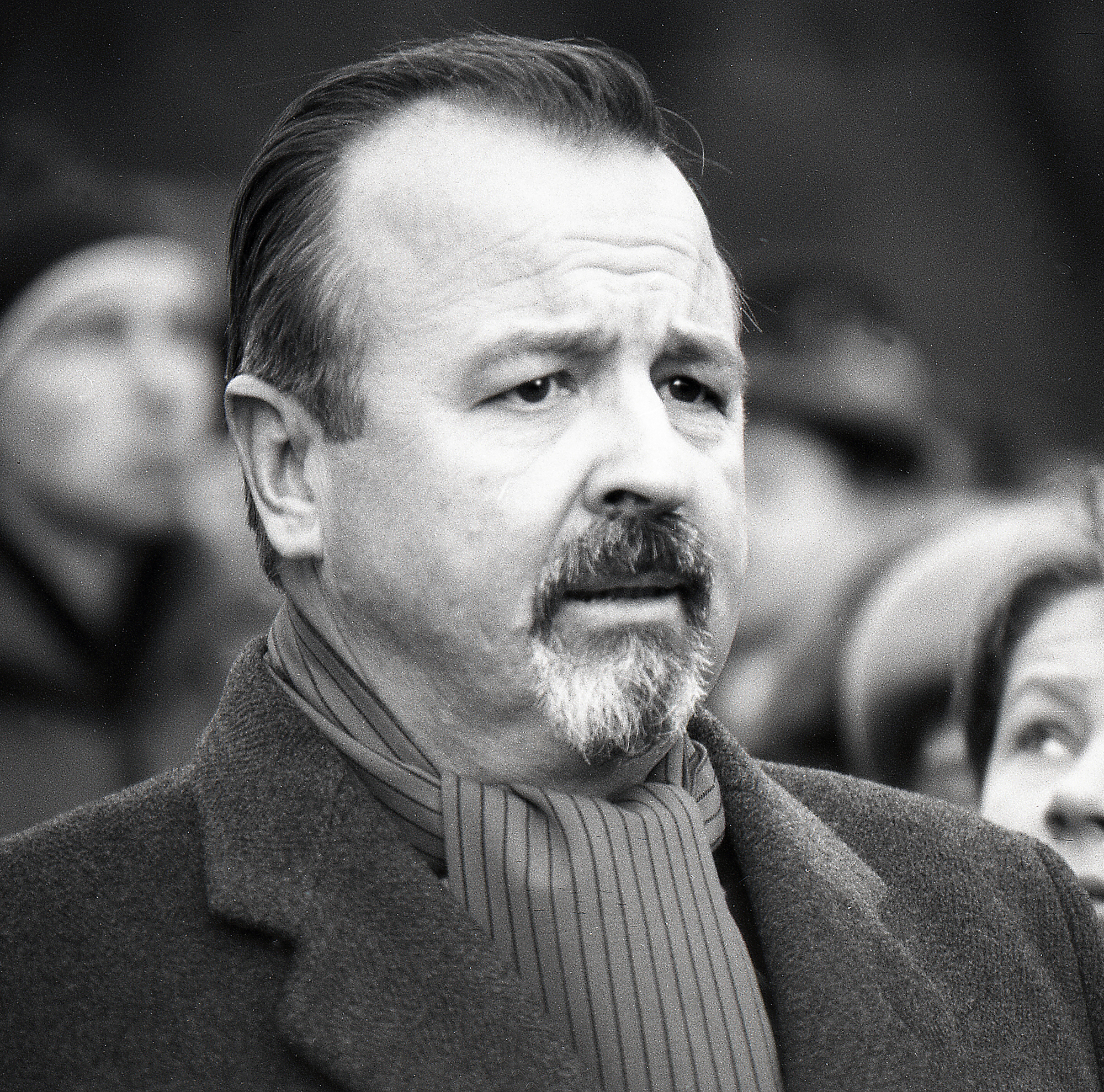
- Annus in 1990

First Secretary of the Communist Party of Estonia (CPSU)
- In office December 1990 – 22 August 1991
- Preceded by: Position established Vaino Väljas (as First Secretary of the Communist Party of Estonia)
- Succeeded by: Position abolished

Personal details
- Born: 17 September 1941 Kohtla-Järve, German-occupied Estonia
- Died: 4 July 2018 (aged 76) Tallinn, Estonia
- Party: Communist Party of the Soviet Union (1963–1991)

Lembit Annus (Russian: Ле́мбит Эльма́рович А́ннус, romanized: Lembit Elmarovich Annus; 17 September 1941 – 4 July 2018) was an Estonian politician who was the only First Secretary of the Communist Party of Estonia (CPSU).

== Biography ==
Annus was born in Kohtla-Järve shortly after the German occupation of Estonia during World War II began. In 1960, he graduated from the Tallinn Construction and Installation Technical School (now the Tallinn University of Applied Sciences), after which he spent a year in the Soviet Armed Forces. Between 1961 and 1964, he worked in the municipal repair and construction administration, and later as a workshop manager at the Tee Consumer Services Combine in Tallinn. He joined the Communist Party of the Soviet Union in 1963. In 1973, Annus graduated from the Higher Party School and in 1979 from the Academy of Social Sciences.

== Party career ==
In 1964, Annus began his political career as Second Secretary of the Maritime District Committee of the Leninist Young Communist League of Estonia, later becoming Head of a Department of the Central Committee. From 1971, he worked in the Maritime District Committee as a department head, instructor, and sector head. In 1979, he became an aide to Karl Vaino, First Secretary of the Central Committee

From 1983 to 1989, Annus was editor-in-chief of the journal Eesti Kommunist. From 1989, he served as an inspector of the Central Committee of the CPE. In March 1990, he became First Secretary of the Kalinin (now Kopli) District Committee. At the 28th Congress of the CPSU in July 1990, he was elected a member of the Central Committee of the CPSU and the Politburo the following January. He also served as a deputy of the Supreme Soviet of the Estonian SSR. The EKP held its 21st Party Congress in the fall of 1990, where they elected Annus as the First Secretary. From December 1990 until the banning of the party on 22 August 1991, Annus served as First Secretary of the Central Committee of the Communist Party of Estonia. In April 1991 Annus expressed willingness to enter a coalition government in Estonia. He left office after the 1991 Soviet coup attempt.

== Post-leadership ==
After August 1991, he worked as the Estonia correspondent for Pravda. From 1993 to 1999, he was a member of the Tallinn City Council and a member of the Political Executive Committee of the Union of Communist Parties – Communist Party of the Soviet Union In the 1993 local government council elections, he received 4,116 votes in Tallinn's 8th district and was a member of the Tallinn City Council from 1993 to 1996 as a member of the Estonian United Left Party. He died in 2018 at the age of 76.
