= Yevgen Tsarkov =

Ukrainian politician (born 1974)

- Євген Ігорович Царьков
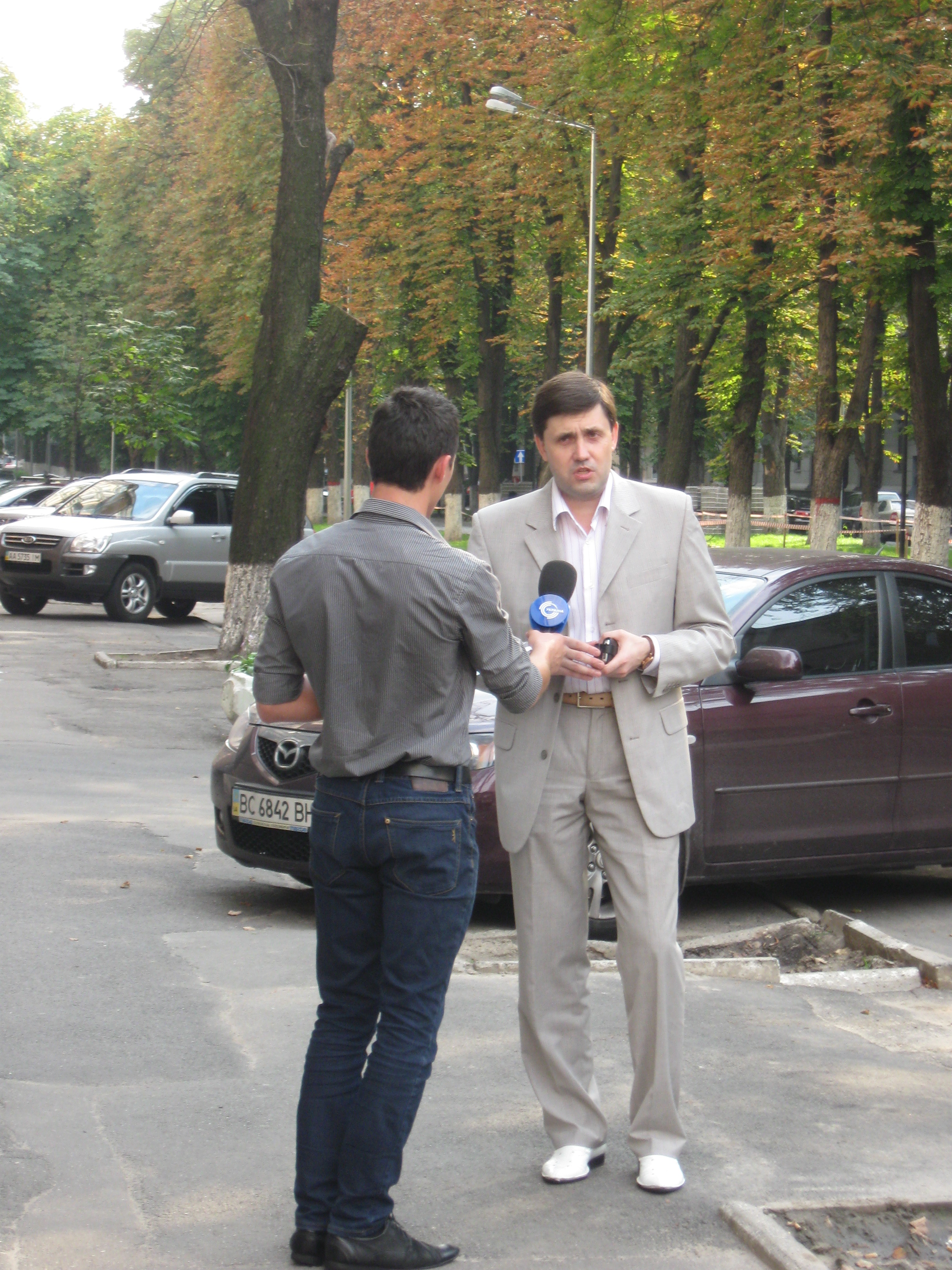
- Tsarkov being interviewed in 2011

People's Deputy of Ukraine of the Verkhovna Rada
- In office 12 December 2008 – 12 December 2012
- Succeeded by: Oleksandr Presman

Personal details
- Born: October 14, 1974 (age 51) Kommunarsk, Ukrainian SSR, Soviet Union (now Alchevsk, Ukraine)
- Party: Communist Party of Ukraine
- Education: Professional College of Maritime Transport; Odesa University
- Occupation: Politician

Yevgen Igorovich Tsarkov (Ukrainian: Євген Ігорович Царьков; Russian: Евгений Игоревич Царьков; born 14 October 1974) is a politician. He was a People's Deputy of Ukraine of the Verkhovna Rada during its VI сonvocation for the Communist Party of Ukraine.

== Early life ==
Tsarkov was born on 14 October 1974 in the city of Kommunarsk, which was then part of the Ukrainian SSR in the Soviet Union (now Alchevsk). After attending secondary school, he graduated from the Professional College of Maritime Transport in Odesa. He then left to undergo training in Kogalym in the Russian SSR, working on dredgers, where he received a working specialty as a mechanical equipment operator. He then returned to Ukraine and graduated from Odesa University in 2006 after majoring in political science.

== Political career ==
In 1998, he joined the Communist Party of Ukraine. Starting in 2001, he worked as an assistant to various members of the Verkhovna Rada.

In 2005, he became First Secretary of the Central Committee of the Komsomol of the Communist Party of Ukraine, which was the same year he joined the committee. He served in this position until 2009. He had also previously been First Secretary of the Odesa Oblast Committee. In 2009, he became Chairman of the International Union of Komsomol Organisations - All-Union Lenin Communist Union of Youth, which is an association of communist youth groups. That same year he also became a member of the Soviet of the Union of Communist Parties – Communist Party of the Soviet Union. He became advisor to the First Vice Chairman of the Verkhovna Rada in 2013. The latest positions he held were as a member of the presidium of the Central Committee of the Communist Party of Ukraine, which he became part of in 2014, and as Secretary of the Union of Communist Parties – Communist Party of the Soviet Union.

In 2008, he was elected to be a People's Deputy of Ukraine representing the party. He served for one term until 2012 during its VI convocation. He had previously run unsuccessfully in 2002 for constituency no. 144, placing second, and in 2006 when he was part of the party list. During the 2012 Ukrainian parliamentary elections, he attempted to run again for the 7th convocation but lost to the Party of Regions candidate Oleksandr Presman.

== Views ==
Opponents have accused him of Ukrainaphobic statements. Thus he has claimed that "NKVD squashed nationalists insufficiently". He declares himself an opponent of capitalism, NATO, fascism and nationalism. In 2008, when he was still the First Secretary of the Odesa Oblast Committee, during the debate regarding making Russian the official second state language of Ukraine, he heavily supported the legislation and helped set up the "I speak Russian!" campaign in Odesa to collect signatures in support of the referendum.

He supports the traditional family and once initiated a legislation proposal for prohibiting the "propaganda of homosexuality". In October 2012, at the height of the legislation's support, he argued that the bill targeted "deliberate" promotion of values rather than factual coverage, and that it did not apply to personal use. He also, at the time, rejected counterarguments that the bill could be a potential block to Ukraine's future visa-free access with the European Union. Ukrainian human rights advocates criticised Tsarkov over the bill and he was called the "Homophobe of the Year 2012" in Ukrainian human rights advocacy groups. Separately, Amnesty International released a public statement opposing the bill, saying it violated multiple international obligations.
