= Ihor Vasylkovskyi =

Former Ukrainian politician

- Ігор Васильковський
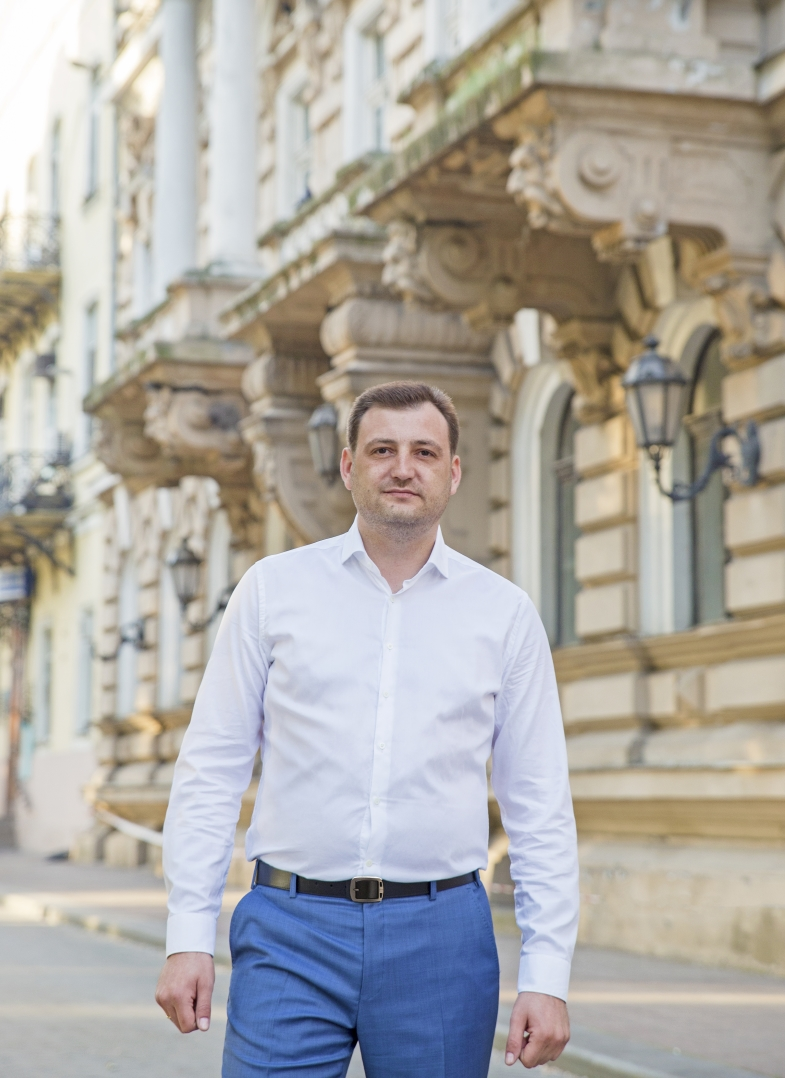

People's Deputy of Ukraine
- In office 29 April 2019 – 3 November 2022
- Preceded by: Oleksandr Presman
- Constituency: Odesa Oblast, No. 139

Personal details
- Born: 31 March 1985 (age 41) Odesa, Ukrainian SSR, Soviet Union (now Ukraine)
- Citizenship: Stateless
- Party: Servant of the People

Ihor Ihorovych Vasylkovskyi (Ukrainian: Ігор Ігорович Васильковський; born 31 March 1985) is a former Ukrainian politician who is a former People's Deputy of Ukraine, serving from 2019 to 2022, and a member of the Servant of the People party.

He was the Head of the Subcommittee on Maritime Transport of the Verkhovna Rada of Ukraine Committee on Transport and Infrastructure, founder of the Igor Vasylkovsky Charitable Foundation, founder of the Na-Starte Crowdfunding Platform.

He is a doctor of Law.

According to Ukrainian media reports, President Voldymyr Zelenskyy terminated Vasylkovskyi's Ukrainian citizenship by his secret decree on 19 July 2022. During the election campaign, it was reported that Vasylkovsky had Bulgarian citizenship.

On 3 November 2022, the Verkhovna Rada terminated the powers of people's deputies Vasylkovskyi and Vadym Rabinovych, who were deprived of Ukrainian citizenship by signed and revealed presidential decree No. 502/2022.

== Biography ==
On 26 February 2020 he received the degree of candidate of legal sciences, Private Higher Educational Institution "European University".

President Zelenskyy deprived Valilkovsky by his decree on 18 July 2022 of Ukrainian citizenship, and subsequently the Verkhovna Rada deprived Vasilkovsky of his mandate on 3 November.
