= Electoral history of Gennady Zyuganov =

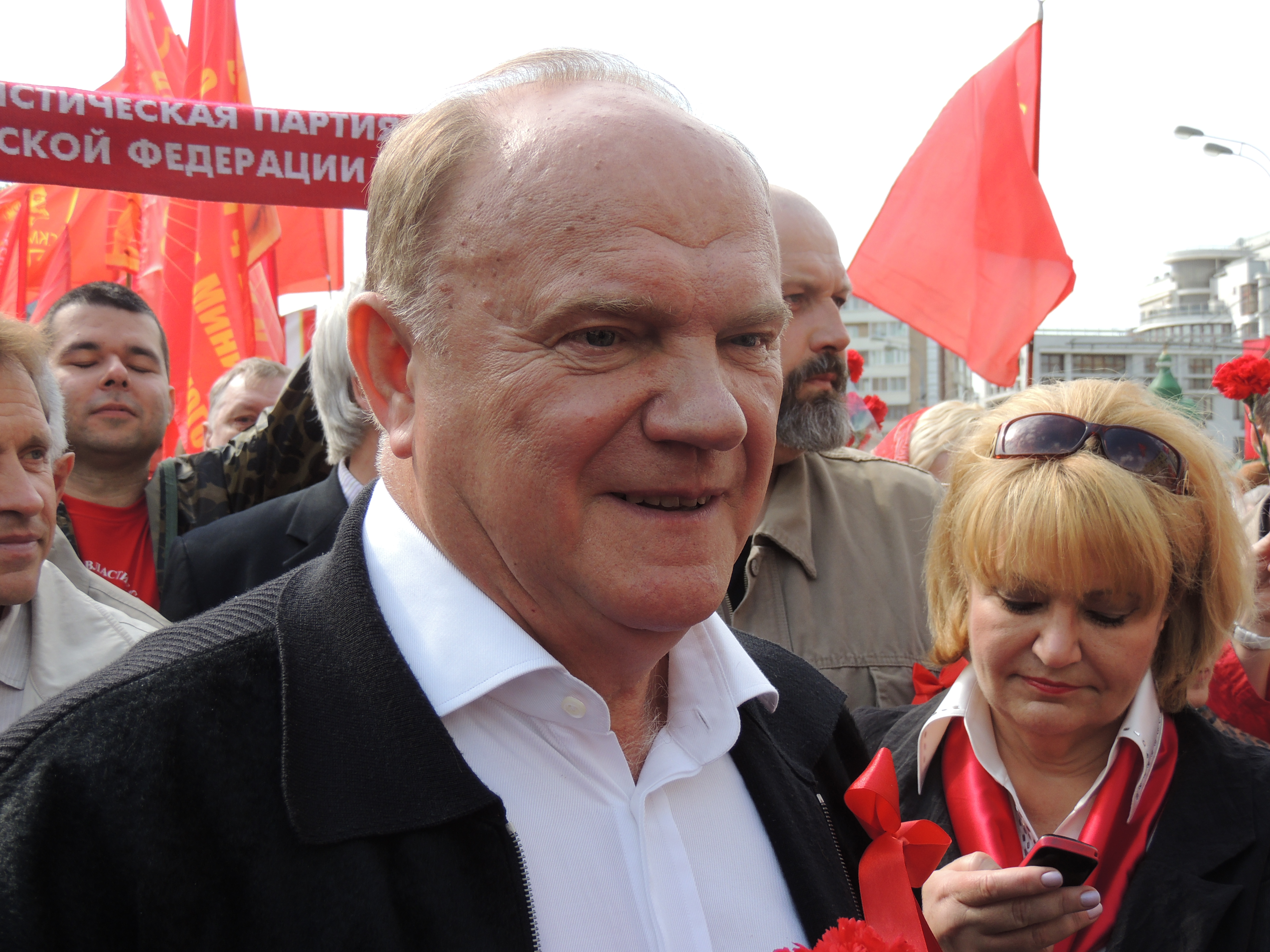
Gennady Zyuganov

Gennady Zyuganov, member of the State Duma and leader of Communist Party since 1993, has run for presidential candidate, 1996, 2000, 2008 and 2012.

== Presidential elections ==
=== 1996 ===
First round of 1996 election. Grey indicates a win by Yeltsin, red a win by Zyuganov.

First round of 1996 presidential election
Candidate	Party	Votes	%
Boris Yeltsin	Independent	26,665,495	35.8
Gennady Zyuganov	Communist Party	24,211,686	32.5
Alexander Lebed	Congress of Russian Communities	10,974,736	14.7
Grigory Yavlinsky	Yabloko	5,550,752	7.4
Vladimir Zhirinovsky	Liberal Democratic Party	4,311,479	5.8
Svyatoslav Fyodorov	Party of Workers' Self-Government	699,158	0.9
Mikhail Gorbachev	Independent	386,069	0.5
Martin Shakkum	Independent	277,068	0.4
Yury Vlasov	Independent	151,282	0.2
Vladimir Bryntsalov	Russian Socialist Party	123,065	0.2
Aman Tuleyev	Independent	308	0.0
Against all		1,163,921	1.6
Source: Nohlen & Stöver, Colton

Second round of 1996 election. Grey indicates a win by Yeltsin, red a win by Zyuganov.

Second round of 1996 presidential election
Candidate	Party	Votes	%
Boris Yeltsin	Independent	40,203,948	54.4
Gennady Zyuganov	Communist Party	30,102,288	40.7
Against all		1,163,921	1.6
Source: Nohlen & Stöver, Colton

=== 2000 ===
2000 election. Blue indicates a win by Putin, red a win by Zyuganov, grey a win by Tuleyev.

2000 presidential election
Candidate	Party	Votes	%
Vladimir Putin	Independent	39,740,467	53.4
Gennady Zyuganov	Communist Party	21,928,468	29.5
Grigory Yavlinsky	Yabloko	4,351,450	5.9
Aman Tuleyev	Independent	2,217,364	3.0
Vladimir Zhirinovsky	Liberal Democratic Party	2,026,509	2.7
Konstantin Titov	Independent	1,107,269	1.5
Ella Pamfilova	For Civic Dignity	758,967	1.0
Stanislav Govorukhin	Independent	328,723	0.4
Yury Skuratov	Independent	319,189	0.4
Alexey Podberezkin	Spiritual Heritage	98,177	0.1
Umar Dzhabrailov	Independent	78,498	0.1
Against all		1,414,673	1.9
Source: Nohlen & Stöver, University of Essex

=== 2008 ===
2008 presidential election
Candidates	Party	Votes	%
Dmitry Medvedev	United Russia	52,530,712	71.2
Gennady Zyuganov	Communist Party	13,243,550	18.0
Vladimir Zhirinovsky	Liberal Democratic Party	6,988,510	9.5
Andrei Bogdanov	Democratic Party	968,344	1.3
Source: Nohlen & Stöver

=== 2012 ===
2012 presidential election
Candidates	Party	Votes	%
Vladimir Putin	United Russia	45,602,075	63.60
Gennady Zyuganov	Communist Party	12,318,353	17.18
Mikhail Prokhorov	Independent	5,722,508	7.98
Vladimir Zhirinovsky	Liberal Democratic Party	4,458,103	6.22
Sergey Mironov	A Just Russia	2,763,935	3.85
Source: Central Election Commission of the Russian Federation
