= Klara Ajybekova =

Kyrgyz politician (born 1946)

- Клара Ажыбекова
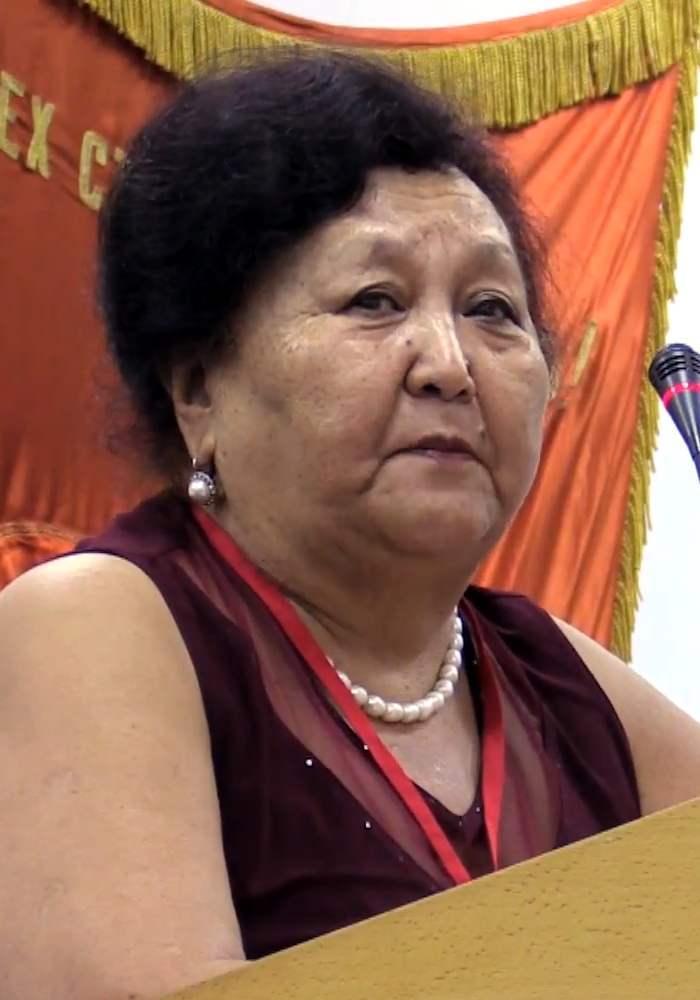

First Secretary of the Communist Party of Kyrgyzstan
- Incumbent
- Assumed office 13 September 1999

Personal details
- Born: 1946 Naryn, Kirghiz Soviet Socialist Republic
- Party: Communist Party of Kyrgyzstan
- Education: Kyrgyz State Medical Academy

Klara Ajybekova (Kyrgyz: Клара Ажыбекова; b. 1946) is a Kyrgyz communist politician.

== Biography ==
Klara Ajybekova was born in 1946, in Naryn, in the Kirghiz Soviet Socialist Republic. After she came of age, in 1964, she went into studying medicine; by 1973, she had graduated from the Kyrgyz State Medical Academy as a Candidate of Sciences. In 1983, she joined the central committee of the Communist Party of Kirghizia, within which she worked on political education and political management.

After the dissolution of the Soviet Union in 1991, Ajybekova went into teaching, lecturing at the Bishkek Humanities University and the Kyrgyz-Russian Slavonic University. In 1999, she participated in the founding of the reformed Communist Party of Kyrgyzstan (KPK), which split from the Party of Communists of Kyrgyzstan (PKK), and was elected as its party secretary. As leader of the KPK, Ajybekova has supported the re-establishment of a socialist state, with state ownership over the economy of Kyrgyzstan, and has even called for the revival of the Soviet Union.

== Bibliography ==
- Abazov, Rafis (2004). "Azhibekova, Klara (1946– )". Historical Dictionary of Kyrgyzstan. Asian/Oceanian Historical Dictionaries. Vol. 49. Lanham, Maryland: Scarecrow Press. pp. 79–80. ISBN 0-8108-4868-6. LCCN 2003019174.
