= Communist Party of Uzbekistan (1994) =

Communist Party of Uzbekistan Oʻzbekiston kommunistik partiyasi
- Abbreviation: OʻzKP, КПУз
- General Secretary: Kaxramon Mahmudov
- Founder: Kaxramon Mahmudov
- Founded: 1994
- Banned: 1994
- Preceded by: Communist Party of Uzbek SSR
- Headquarters: Moscow, Russia (de facto)
- Ideology: Communism; Marxism–Leninism; Socialism; Left-conservatism; Soviet patriotism Anti-clericalism
- Political position: Far-left
- Regional affiliation: UCP–CPSU
- Slogan: "Workers of the world, unite!" (Uzbek: «Бутун дунё пролетарлари, бирлашингиз!»)

Party flag

Website
- skpkpss.ru/uzbekistan

The Communist Party of Uzbekistan (Uzbek: Ўзбекистон коммунистик партияси, romanized: Oʻzbekiston kommunistik partiyasi, Russian: Коммунистическая партия Узбекистана) is a banned Marxist-Leninist party in Uzbekistan, founded in 1994. The party considers itself the only and true successor of the Communist Party of the Uzbek SSR (as part of the CPSU), although on November 1, 1991, the former Communist Party of the Uzbek SSR was transformed into the People's Democratic Party of Uzbekistan (XDP). Many activists and party members were persecuted by the Uzbek authorities, and many were forced to flee the country, mainly to Russia. The founder and permanent leader (first secretary) of the party is Kakhraman Makhmudov.

== History ==
The OʻzKP considers itself the only and true successor of the Communist Party of Uzbekistan (as part of the CPSU), although on 1 November 1991, the former Communist Party was transformed into the People's Democratic Party of Uzbekistan (PDPU). Immediately after its creation, the party's activists tried to officially register the party in Uzbekistan, but in response, the registration of the Communist Party of Uzbekistan was rejected and the party was actually banned throughout Uzbekistan and outlawed. Many activists and party members were persecuted by the Uzbek authorities, and many were forced to flee the country, mainly to Russia. The founder and permanent leader (first secretary) of the party is Kaxramon Mahmudov.

Despite the persecution, the communist movement did not stop in Uzbekistan. In 1996, a pro-Russian circle began to exist in Tashkent, which was unofficially called the Movement of the Communards. The circle was engaged in "theoretical research", rescued discarded communist, socialist and Marxist-Leninist literature from state libraries, sent one of its members to Russia to promote the "communist revolution". In October 1999, the only issue of the samizdat newspaper "Dvikom" was published in Moscow. In the early 2000s, the connection between the Movement of the Communards and Russian like-minded people weakened and subsequently ceased. The composition and structure of the circle underwent great changes, and in 2001 the circle was transformed into the "Tashkent Communist Union". In the summer of 2002, TashKomSoyuz began propaganda and agitational work among Tashkent residents (especially among the working class), including through the Internet. He had a samizdat bulletin "Working Pages", which was published irregularly, about once a week or several times a month.

At present, the actual headquarters of the party is Moscow, where most of the KPUz activists are concentrated. The Communist Party of Uzbekistan is a full member of the Union of Communist Parties – Communist Party of the Soviet Union. KPUz was admitted to the SKP-KPSS on December 12, 1994, at the plenum of the Council of the SKP-KPSS in Moscow. Three representatives of the party are members of the Council of the SKP-CPSU, one - the control and auditing commission of the SKP-KPSS. KPUz has friendly ties with many communist parties of the former union republics of the former USSR. In 2000, party delegates, together with the SKP-KPSS, took part in the Congress of the Peoples of Central Asia and Russia in Bishkek. In December 2014, the first secretary of the KPUz, Kakhraman Makhmudov, officially addressed the Communists of Ukraine, and personally to Petro Symonenko, the leader of the Communist Party of Ukraine, with words of support and solidarity.

== Ideology ==
The OʻzKP advocates the return of Uzbekistan to socialism and communism, the transformation of the country into an independent Soviet Socialist Republic of Uzbekistan (SSRU), with a one-party system, planned economy, atheistic ideology and with a socialist model of society and politics of the country in the spirit of the ideology of Marxism-Leninism.
