= Vyacheslav Klykov =

Russian sculptor

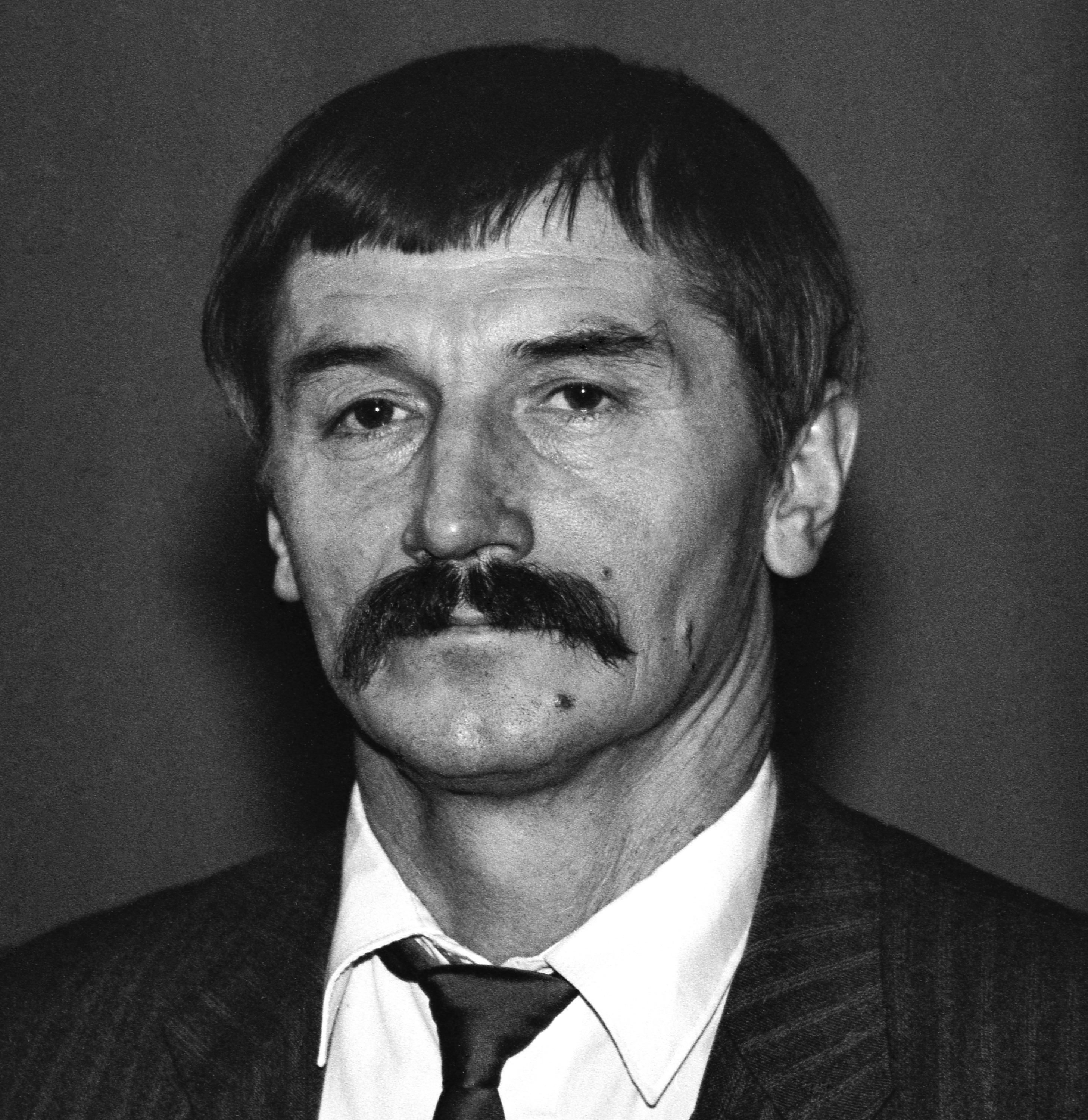
December 1991

Vyacheslav Mikhailovich Klykov (Russian: Вячесла́в Миха́йлович Клы́ков; 19 October 1939 — 2 June 2006) was a Russian sculptor who specialized in public monuments to key figures of national history and culture.

== Biography ==
He was born into a peasant family near Kursk and studied in the Surikov Art Institute in Moscow, matriculating in 1964. Klykov's bronze statues did not conform to the precepts of Socialist Realism. His playful sculptural decor for the Central Musical Theatre for Children (1979) made him famous. In the late 1980s Klykov turned to the Russian Orthodox Church for inspiration and support. His public statue of Sergius of Radonezh in Radonezh (1987) was the first memorial installed in the Soviet Union without permission from the authorities.

Klykov's other high-profile commissions include the memorial and church on the Field of Prokhorovka (1995), the public statues of Sts. Cyril and Methodius on Slavyanskaya Square (1991) and Marshal Zhukov on Manege Square (1995). He was also responsible for the statue of St. Vladimir in Kherson (1993) and several monuments to Nicholas II, including the first one erected in Russia, in 1996, which was blown up by anti-monarchists on several occasions.

In the 1990s, Klykov created and ran the International Fund of Slavonic Literature and Culture, a nationalist organization with close connections to the Pamyat, and (later) Rodina. In July 1991, Klykov signed the open letter A Word to the People, an anti-Perestroika publication. In 1990s, Klykov was close to the CPRF; on 21 November 2005, he was elected the chairman of the re-founded Union of the Russian People. In 2005, he signed the Letter of 5000, a controversial appeal to the Prosecutor General to review all Jewish organizations in Russia for extremism. In 2005, a reports circulated that Klykov had unveiled a statue in the village of Kholki that depicted Sviatoslav I of Kiev trampling a Khazar warrior with a prominently displayed Star of David. The Press Center of the Belgorod Regional Administration issued a response stating that while plans for a monument were underway, none had yet been erected in the region thus far, and that the design of the monument would show "respect towards representatives of all nationalities and religions." The statue was eventually unveiled and the response by the Press Center has been confirmed. The statue is in the village of Kholki, near Belgorod.

== See also ==
- List of Russian artists
