= Communist Party of the Soviet Union (2001) =

Political organization in former Soviet states

Communist Party of the Soviet Union Коммунистическая Партия Советского Союза Kommunisticheskaya Partiya Sovetskogo Soyuza
- Leader: Sergey Alexandrov
- Founded: 21 July 2001
- Split from: Union of Communist Parties – Communist Party of the Soviet Union
- Headquarters: Moscow, Russia
- Ideology: Communism; Marxism–Leninism; Anti-revisionism
- Political position: Far-left
- European affiliation: INITIATIVE (defunct)
- International affiliation: IMCWP; ICS (defunct)
- Colours: Red

Party flag

Website
- cpsu.by

The Communist Party of the Soviet Union (Russian: Коммунистическая Партия Советского Союза, Kommunisticheskaya Partiya Sovetskogo Soyuza; short: КПСС, KPSS) is an organization which split from the Union of Communist Parties – Communist Party of the Soviet Union in 2001 after disagreements between Oleg Shenin and Gennady Zyuganov over the creation of a united Marxist-Leninist party of the Union of Belarus and Russia. It had been led by Shenin until his death in May 2009.

== Background ==
Following the collapse of the Soviet Union in 1991, various communist organizations re-emerged in former Soviet republics. As such, a 29th congress of the "Communist Party of the Soviet Union" (UCP-CPSU) was held from March 26-27 1993. The organization simultaneously presented itself as the successor to the CPSU, as well as a coordinating body for post-independence communist parties. The organization was led by Oleg Shenin, a principal conspirator in the 1991 Soviet coup attempt.

Shenin wanted the group to develop into the nucleus of an all-Union communist party that would possess centralized discipline, a common political line and authority over its national organizations. Gennady Zyuganov, and the leadership of the Communist Party of the Russian Federation (CPRF), however, favored retaining its status as a loose coordinating body.

Shenin and the UCP-CPSU plenum authorized on January 29, 2000, the merger between the CPRF and the Communist Party of Belarus (CPB) into a unified Union State communist party. On 15 July 2000 the Communist Party of the Union of Russia and Belarus held its founding congress and elected Shenin as its chairman. However, Zyuganov and the CPRF rejected this merger, insisting that Shenin had acted without proper authorization and his actions where null and void. The CPB also refused to approve this merger, which Shenin claimed was due to pressure from the CPRF.

Shenin survived a vote of no confidence on 28 October 2000 before calling the 32nd Congress of the UCP-CPSU on 15 January 2001 during which, on 20 January, Shenin was removed from office and Zyuganov elected in his place. Shenin, meanwhile, rejected this, arguing that the 32nd Congress never reached quorum and therefore his removal was invalid.

== Leaders ==
- Oleg Shenin (21 July 2001 – 28 May 2009; as Chairman)
- Vladimir Berezin (20 March–16 July 2010; as First Secretary)
- Sergey Alexandrov (acting 21 July 2010; official from 20 November 2010–present)

== Members ==
Party	State	Source
Communist Party of Abkhazia	Abkhazia (Note: Abkhazia is a partially recognized state.)	
United Communist Party of Armenia	Armenia	
Communist Party of Azerbaijan (Note: Note that there are two parties named "Communist Party of Azerbaijan". They are completely different parties, with completely different leaders. One is a member of the "Union of Communist Parties – Communist Party of the Soviet Union", while the other one is a member of the "Communist Party of the Soviet Union (2001)".)	Azerbaijan	
Republican Committee of the Communist Party of Belarus	Belarus	
Communist Party of Estonia	Estonia	
New Communist Party of Georgia	Georgia	
Communist Party of Kyrgyzstan	Kyrgyzstan	
Socialist Party of Latvia	Latvia	
Socialist People's Front	Lithuania	
Russian Communist Workers' Party of the Communist Party of the Soviet Union	Russia	
Communist Party of Transnistria	Transnistria (Note: Transnistria is a partially recognized state.)	
Party of Workers and Villages of Ukraine	Ukraine	

=== Former members ===
Party	years	State	Note	Source
Party of Communists of the Republic of South Ossetia	2001-2004	South Ossetia (Note: South Ossetia is a partially recognized state.)	Splinter from the Communist Party of South Ossetia, liquidated in 2004 after declaring bankruptcy	
Pavlodar regional committee of the Communist Party of Kazakhstan	1991-2015	Kazakhstan	Communist Party of Kazakhstan banned in 2015	
Union of Communists of Ukraine	1992-2015	Ukraine	Banned per Ukraine's 2015 decommunization law	
