= Union of Communist Parties – Communist Party of the Soviet Union =

Federation of communist parties in the post-Soviet states

Union of Communist Parties – Communist Party of the Soviet Union Союз коммунистических партий — Коммунистическая партия Советского Союза
- Abbreviation: UCP–CPSU (English); SKP–KPSS (Russian)
- Chairman of the Central Council: Gennady Zyuganov
- First Deputy Chairman of the Central Council: Kazbek Taysaev
- Secretariat of the Central Council: Secretariat: Petro Symonenko Ihar Karpienka Dmitry Novikov Juozas Jermalavičius Igor Makarov Oleg Khorzhan Ivan Nikitchuk Ilgam Gapisov Marina Kostina Yevgen Tsarkov
- Founder: Oleg Shenin
- Founded: 26 March 1993; 33 years ago
- Preceded by: Communist Party of the Soviet Union
- Headquarters: Moscow, Russia
- Newspaper: Pravda; Pravda Rossii; Sovetskaya Rossiya
- Youth wing: MSKO Komsomol
- Ideology: Communism; Marxism–Leninism; Soviet patriotism Proletarian internationalism
- Political position: Far-left
- International affiliation: IMCWP
- Colours: Red
- Slogan: "Workers' Power, Socialism, Soviet Union" (Russian: Власть трудящихся, социализм, Советский Союз»)
- Anthem: "The Internationale" (Интернациона́л)
- Post-Soviet states Upper houses: 3 / 283
- Post-Soviet states Lower houses: 55 / 2,296

Website
- skpkpss.ru

The Union of Communist Parties – Communist Party of the Soviet Union (UCP–CPSU) (Note: Russian: Союз коммунистических партий – Коммунистическая партия Советского Союза, romanized: Soyuz kommunisticheskikh partiy – Kommunisticheskaya partiya Sovetskogo Soyuza, abbr. СКП–КПСС) is a federation of communist parties in the post-Soviet states founded in 1993.

Gennady Zyuganov has been the organisation's chairman since 2001. He replaced Oleg Shenin, who split off a part of the UCP–CPSU as the "Communist Party of the Soviet Union".

== Composition of the UPC–CPSU ==
The structure of the UCP-CPSU consists of 18 communist parties within the former Soviet Union.

=== Members ===
- Abkhazia: Communist Party of Abkhazia
- Armenia: Armenian Communist Party
- Azerbaijan: Communist Party of Azerbaijan
- Belarus: Communist Party of Belarus
- Estonia: Communist Party of Estonia (Banned)
- Georgia: Unified Communist Party of Georgia
- Kazakhstan: Communist Party of Kazakhstan (Banned)
- Kyrgyzstan: Party of Communists of Kyrgyzstan
- Latvia: League of Communists of Latvia
- Lithuania: Communist Party of Lithuania (Banned)
- Moldova: Party of Communists of the Republic of Moldova
- Russia: Communist Party of the Russian Federation (CPRF)
- South Ossetia: Communist Party of South Ossetia
- Tajikistan: Communist Party of Tajikistan
- Transnistria: Transnistrian Communist Party
- Turkmenistan: Communist Party of Turkmenistan (Banned)
- Ukraine: Communist Party of Ukraine (Banned)
- Uzbekistan: Communist Party of Uzbekistan (Banned)

State	Party	Election	Lower house	Upper house	Leader
Abkhazia (Note: Abkhazia, South Ossetia, and Transnistria are partially or wholly unrecognised states.)	Communist Party of Abkhazia	2022 election	0 / 35	—	Bakur Bebia
Armenia	Armenian Communist Party	2026 election	0 / 132	—	Erjanik Ghazaryan (acting)
Azerbaijan	Communist Party of Azerbaijan	2024 election (Note: Did not participate)	0 / 125	—	Kurbanov Rauf Muslimovich
Belarus	Communist Party of Belarus	2024 election (lower, upper)	7 / 110	1 / 64	Aliaksiej Sokal
Estonia	Communist Party of Estonia	2023 election	Banned in Estonia		vacant
Georgia	Unified Communist Party of Georgia	2024 election	0 / 150	—	Teimuraz Samnidze
Kazakhstan	Communist Party of Kazakhstan	2026 election	Banned in Kazakhstan		Toleubek Makhzhanov
Kyrgyzstan	Party of Communists of Kyrgyzstan	2025 election	0 / 120	—	Ishak Masaliev
Latvia	League of Communists of Latvia	2026 election	Banned in Latvia		vacant
Lithuania	Communist Party of Lithuania	2024 election	Banned in Lithuania		vacant
Moldova	Party of Communists of the Republic of Moldova	2025 election	8 / 101	—	Vladimir Voronin
Russia	Communist Party of the Russian Federation	2026 election	37 / 450	2 / 170	Gennady Zyuganov
South Ossetia	Communist Party of South Ossetia	2024 election	3 / 34	—	Stanislav Kochiev
Tajikistan	Communist Party of Tajikistan	2025 election	0 / 63	—	Shodi Shabdolov
Transnistria	Transnistrian Communist Party	2025 election	0 / 43	—	Nadezhda Bondarenko
Turkmenistan	Communist Party of Turkmenistan	2023 election	Banned in Turkmenistan		Serdar Rahimow
Ukraine	Communist Party of Ukraine	2019 election	Banned in Ukraine		Petro Symonenko
Uzbekistan	Communist Party of Uzbekistan	2024 election	Banned in Uzbekistan		Kaxramon Mahmudov

== See also ==
- All-Union Communist Party of Bolsheviks (1991)
- All-Union Communist Party (Bolsheviks) (1995)
- Communist Party of the Soviet Union
- Communist Party of the Soviet Union (2001)
- Essence of Time
