= Communist Party of Turkmenistan (1998) =

Communist Party of Turkmenistan Türkmenistanyň Kommunistik Partiýasy
- Founder: Serdar Rahimow
- Founded: 1998
- Banned: 2002
- Ideology: Communism; Marxism–Leninism; Left-conservatism; Soviet patriotism
- Political position: Far-left
- European affiliation: UCP–CPSU

The Communist Party of Turkmenistan (in Turkmen: Türkmenistanyň Kommunistik Partiýasy (TKP)/Түркменистаның Коммунистик Партиясы (ТКП), in Russian: Коммунистическая партия Туркменистана) is a banned Marxist-Leninist political party in Turkmenistan that was founded in 1998.

The original Communist Party of Turkmenistan was founded when Turkmenistan became a Republic in 1924. It was dissolved in December 1991 and reconstituted as the Democratic Party of Turkmenistan that has ruled the country since then. In 1992, an Organizing Committee for the Restoration of the Communist Party was founded but the party was not legalized. In 1998, a constituent congress of the TKP was held and until 2002 it operated semi-legally. In that period Serdar Rahimow, a former ambassador to Pakistan became the leader of the KPT and the party became a member of the UCP-CPSU. On 25 November 2002, President Saparmurat Niyazov's motorcade was fired upon at about 7 a.m. in downtown Ashgabat. Some sixty persons were arrested, among them Serdar Rahimow, and sentenced to long prison sentences. Since then the TKP went deep underground.
