= Olga Lander =

Soviet photographer and journalist (1909–1996)

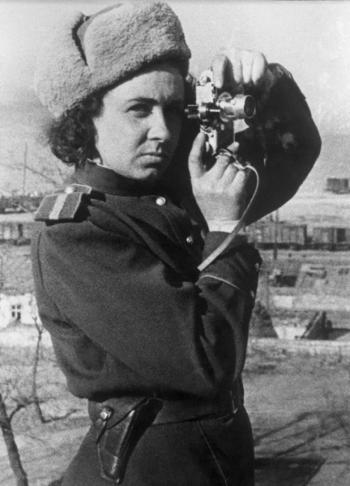
- Born: 10 April 1909; Samara, Russian Empire
- Died: 19 September 1996 (aged 87); Moscow, Russia
- Education: Stroganov Moscow State Academy of Arts and Industry
- Occupations: photographer; journalist
- Awards: Knight of the Order of the Red Star; Order of the Patriotic War, 2nd Class

Olga Alexandrovna Lander (Russian: Ольга Александровна Ландер; 10 April 1909 – 19 September 1996) was a Soviet documentary photographer and journalist who studied photography with Moses Nappelbaum and David Sternberg. During World War II, Lander was a photojournalist and correspondent from the front of the Great Patriotic War. Lander accompanied the 3rd Ukrainian Front to areas including Kursk, Odessa and Vienna. She photographed a wide range of activities, including distinguished soldiers, official events, the action of advanced units in the battlefield, and everyday activities that included soldiers, mechanics, medical personnel, and stage performers.

During the war Lander rose to the rank of lieutenant. She was awarded medals for her photojournalistic work, including the Knight of the Order of the Red Star, and the Order of the Patriotic War, 2nd Class. Following the war, she worked at the Exhibition of Achievements of National Economy (VDNH) and as a photographer for the newspaper Sovetskaya Rossiya. She retired in 1974 and published a memoir of her life, Frontovymi dorogami in 1986.

== Early life and education ==
Lander was the daughter of Jewish photographer Aleksandr Issajewitch Lander and his wife Yevgenija Issakovna, and is considered a second-generation Soviet Jewish photojournalist. After graduating from high school in Samara, she moved to Moscow to attend the Moscow State Stroganov Academy of Industrial and Applied Arts in 1927. She also began to work with photographer Moses Nappelbaum and became a student and assistant of David Sternberg.

From 1930 Lander worked for the film studio Tadshikfilm, traveling in Central Asia. She initially worked as a photographic laboratory assistant for the newspaper Komsomolskaya Pravda, but soon became a photo correspondent, traveling broadly through the Soviet Union.

== Career ==
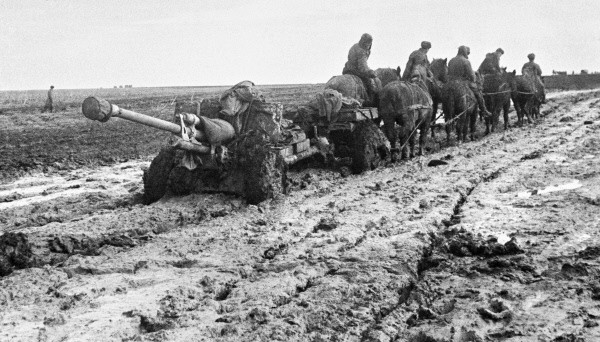
Artillery is pulled into new positions by horses, photograph by Olga Lander, 1942

Following the invasion of the USSR by the Nazis in June 1941, Lander was evacuated to Tashkent. She repeatedly appealed to be moved to a more active area, and by 1942, she had returned to Moscow. She broke with protocol and volunteered herself to be sent to the front with the military newspaper Sovetsky Voin (Soviet Soldier). Lander was given a military uniform and insignia, and at times was accompanied by a military escort provided by the army unit she was covering. She was one of only a few photographers who served continuously without returning to the editorial offices.

Lander is one of five women photographers known to have served at the front, out of 200 war photographers. The others were Olga Ignatovich, Galina Sankova, Yelizaveta Mikulina and Natasha Bode. For much of the war, Lander's photographs were published with the credit of "O. Lander", which gave no indication of gender. By March 1944, she was credited as "Olga Lander".

Lander accompanied the 3rd Ukrainian Front, documenting major engagements including the Battle of Kursk, the Odessa Offensive, the Vienna offensive, and fighting in Kiev, Romania, Hungary. Lander was in Vienna for Victory in Europe Day. She remained with the editorial team in Soviet-occupied Romania until 1948. Over 1500 of her photographs were published in newspapers in the 1940s, showing both daily life and front line battles across Yugoslavia, Romania and Hungary. She also documented the soldiers' homecoming and rebuilding at the end of the war.

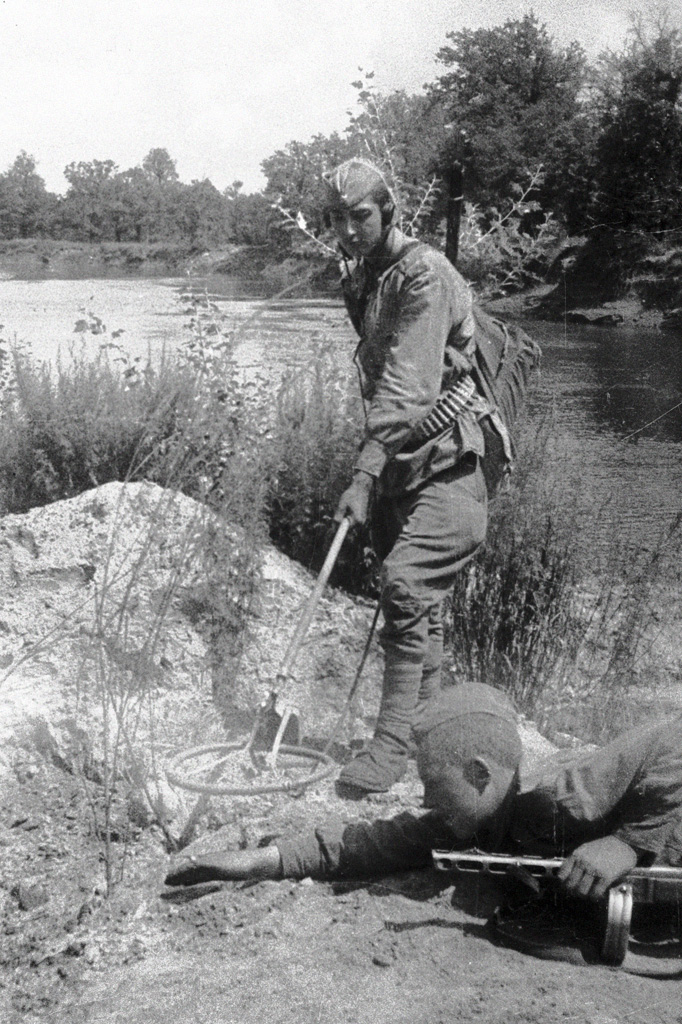
Soviet sappers defuse explosive devices during the Great Patriotic War (WW2), photograph by Olga Lander, 1943

During the war, Lander used an FED camera, a Soviet copy of Germany's Leica camera. Lander's camera had a fixed 50 mm focal length, which meant that Lander could not zoom in on her subjects. To take photographs she had to be close to the action, despite the dangers this posed in war-time. The small-format camera produced lower quality negatives than a large-format camera, but allowed her to move quickly and achieve an immediacy in her photographs. Developing the photographs she took was an ongoing challenge, constantly requiring her to improvise. In her memoirs, she wrote: "I had no darkroom. Wherever I went, I had to build one. In the villages I used closets…in the cities I looked for dark basement corners."

After her discharge from the army, Lander returned to Moscow, where she worked in the photographic department of Exhibition of Achievements of National Economy (VDNH). Lander eventually began to work as a photographer for the newspaper Sovetskaya Rossiya, which was first published in 1956. She remained there until her retirement in 1974.

Lander was one of nine Moscow-based women photojournalists profiled in an article in Sovetskoe Foto in 1974. Her work was included in An Anthology of Soviet Photography, 1941–1945 (1987). Lander published a memoir of her life, Frontovymi dorogami in 1986. She died in 1996.

== Awards and honors ==
During the war, Lander rose to the rank of lieutenant. She was awarded the following medals for her photographic work.

- Order of the Red Star
- Order of the Patriotic War, 2nd Class

== Collections and exhibitions ==
Over 3000 of Lander's war negatives are kept in archives, including the State Historical Museum and the Central Museum of the Russian Armed Forces in Moscow, the Russian State Film and Photo Archive in Krasnogorsk, Moscow Oblast.

Exhibitions focusing on or including her work include:

- 2006, Breaking the Frame: Pioneering Women in Photojournalism, Museum of Photographic Arts, Balboa Park, San Diego
- 2011, Through Soviet Jewish Eyes, CU Art Museum, University of Colorado Boulder
- 2013, Soviet photography, State Russian Museum and Exhibition Centre for Photography, Saint-Petersburg
- 2017, Olga Lander. The Supplemented Reality of the War, Museum of Military Uniforms, Moscow
- 2017–2018, Wartime and Adventure, Women Photojournalists in Europe 1914 – 1945 / Kriegsalltag und Abenteuerlust, Kriegsfotografinnen in Europa 1914–1945, Das Verborgene Museum
- 2018, Olga Lander – Sowjetische Kriegsfotografin im Zweiten Weltkrieg (Olga Lander – Soviet war photographer in the Second World War), Deutsch-russisches Museum, Karlshorst
- 2021, Yevgeny Khaldei. The Photographer of the Liberation (Jewgenij Chaldej Der Fotograf der Befreiung), Jewish Museum Vienna (also included photographs by Olga Lander)
- 2021, Communism Through the Lens: Everyday Life Captured by Women Photographers in the Dodge Collection, Norton and Nancy Dodge Collection of Nonconformist Art from the Soviet Union, Zimmerli Art Museum, Rutgers University
