= Mymrino =

Mymrino Мымрино
- Rural locality
- Interactive map of Mymrino
- Location of Mymrino
- Coordinates: 53°18′08″N 35°29′24″E
- Country: Russia
- Federal subject: Oryol Oblast

Population
  - Estimate (2010): 155 )
- Time zone: UTC+3 (MSK)
- Postal code: 303105
- OKTMO ID: 54620432106

Mymrino (Russian: Мы́мрино) is a rural locality (a village) in Uzkinskoye Rural Settlement of Znamensky District, in Oryol Oblast, Russia. Population: 155 (2010 census); 193 (2002 census);

== History ==
Mymrino got its name from the nickname that the peasants gave to their landowner; they called her Mymra. It was first mentioned in 1678 as part of the Sevsky category of the Karachevsky district as an estate in the Khotiml camp.

After the Chernobyl disaster, Mymrino was in the radiation zone of the fourth degree.

== Notable people ==
Mymrino is the birthplace of politician and former Soviet Army colonel Gennady Zyuganov.
