= Oleksandr Presman =

Ukrainian politician

- Олександр Пресман
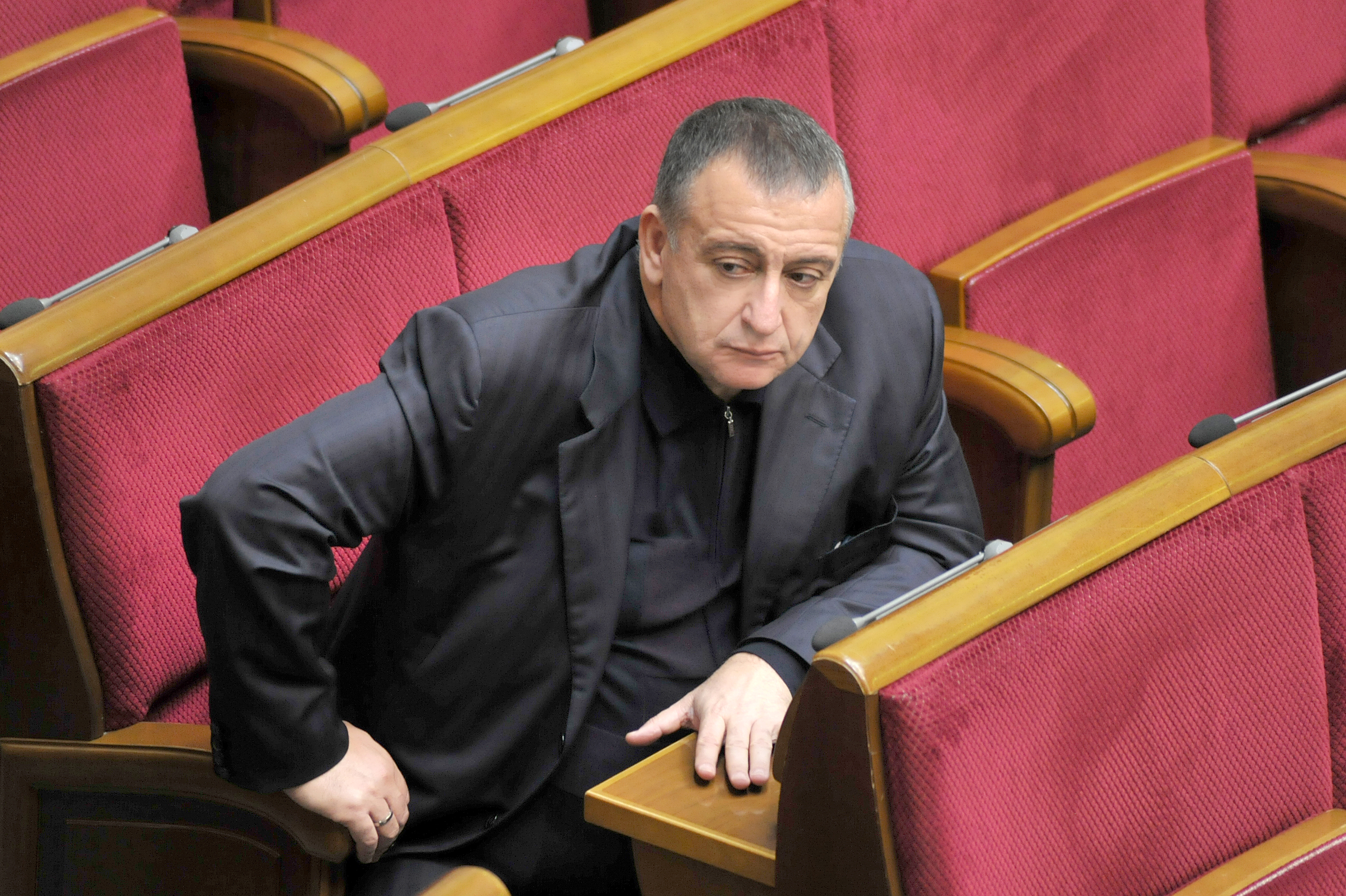

People's Deputy of Ukraine
- In office 12 December 2012 – 29 August 2019
- Preceded by: Constituency established
- Succeeded by: Ihor Vasylkovskyi
- Constituency: Odesa Oblast, No. 139

Personal details
- Born: 10 April 1961 (age 65) Kyiv, Ukrainian SSR, Soviet Union (now Ukraine)
- Party: Revival
- Other political affiliations: Party of Regions

Oleksandr Semenovych Presman (Ukrainian: Олександр Семенович Пресман; born 10 April 1961) is a Ukrainian politician who was a People's Deputy of Ukraine in the 7th and 8th Ukrainian Verkhovna Radas, representing Ukraine's 139th electoral district in Odesa Oblast.

== Education ==
- 1983 — Kyiv National University of Construction and Architecture.

== Career ==
From 1983 to 1984 he worked as a site supervisor, overseer and head dispatcher of the Ministry of Ukraine. From 1989 to 1992 he served as deputy chief of Production and Processing Equipment Agency (PPEA) at Glavukrneftegazstroi.

From 1991 to 1998 he worked at private enterprises.

From 1998 to 2005 he was an advising assistant of a People's Deputy of Ukraine. In 2005 and 2006 he served as assistant of the Ministry of Transportation and Communication.

From 2011-2012 he acted as the president of volleyball club Jinestra.

From 2010-2012 he served as a representative of Odesa Oblast Council. He was the head of the permanent committee of this regional parliament on the questions of interregional and international cooperation and investing activity.

He was the People's deputy of the VIIth and VIIIth convocations. At the parliamentary elections in 2012 he was elected a people's deputy of Ukraine at parliamentary elections in district 139, Odesa Oblast. He won with 53,58 % of votes for Party of Regions. In the 2014 Ukrainian parliamentary election he won district 139 again, this time as an independent politician, with 42.55%. He was a member of the deputy group "Party "Revival". He was a member of the Verkhovna Rada (Ukraine's parliament) Committee on Budget and of the group of parliamentary contacts with Sweden. He was a member of the group of parliamentary contacts with Italy.

In the 2019 Ukrainian parliamentary election, again as an independent politician, he failed to get reelected in district 139, finishing third place with 17.49%.

== Recognition ==
Citizen of Honour of Rozdilna, Ukraine.
