= Gennady Zyuganov =

Russian politician (born 1944)

Gennady Zyuganov MP
- Геннадий Зюганов
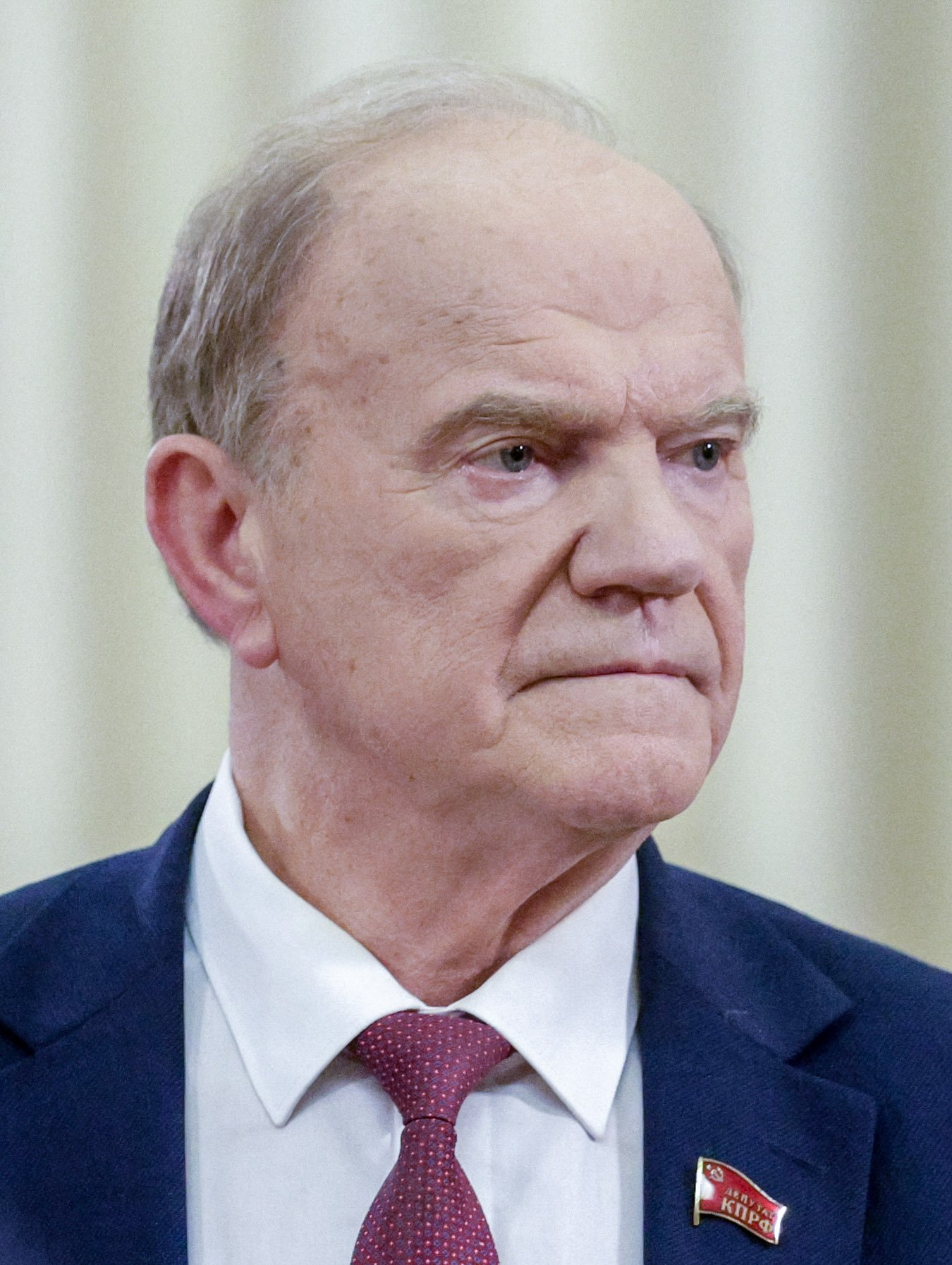
- Zyuganov in 2025

Chair of the Union of Communist Parties
- Incumbent
- Assumed office 22 January 2001
- Preceded by: Oleg Shenin

General Secretary of the Communist Party of the Russian Federation
- Incumbent
- Assumed office 14 February 1993
- Preceded by: Valentin Kuptsov

Member of the State Duma
- Incumbent
- Assumed office 11 January 1994

Personal details
- Born: 26 June 1944 (age 82) Mymrino, Oryol Oblast, Soviet Union
- Party: CPRF (from 1993); CPSU (until 1991)
- Spouse: Nadezhda Vitalyevna
- Children: 2
- Relatives: Leonid Zyuganov (grandson)
- Education: Oryol State Pedagogical Institute; CPSU Central Committee Academy of Social Sciences
- Awards: Order of Alexander Nevsky; Order of the Badge of Honour; Order of Friendship of Peoples (Belarus); Hero of Labour of the Russian Federation
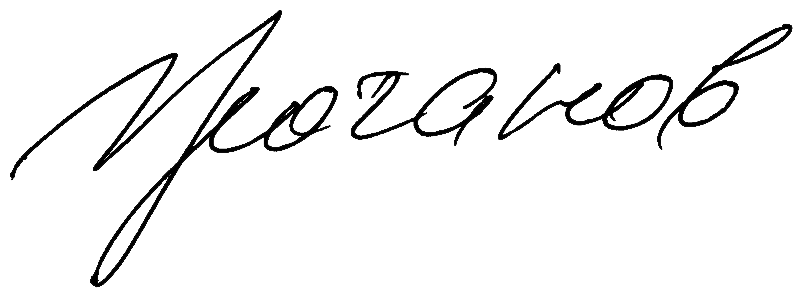
- Signature

Military service
- Allegiance: Soviet Union
- Branch/service: Soviet Army
- Years of service: 1963–1966
- Rank: Colonel
- Zyuganov's voice Recorded 19 September 2023

Gennady Andreyevich Zyuganov (Note: In this name that follows East Slavic naming customs, the patronymic is Andreyevich and the family name is Zyuganov.) (Russian: Геннадий Андреевич Зюганов; born 26 June 1944) is a Russian politician who has been the general secretary of the Communist Party of the Russian Federation since 1993 and a member of the State Duma since 1994. He is also the chair of the Union of Communist Parties – Communist Party of the Soviet Union (UCP-CPSU) since 2001. Zyuganov ran for President of Russia four times, most notably in 1996, when he lost in the second round to Boris Yeltsin.

== Early life and education ==
Gennady Andreyevich Zyuganov was born in Mymrino, a farming village in Oryol Oblast, on 26 June 1944. The son and grandson of schoolteachers, he followed in their footsteps. His father fought at the Soviet-German front of WWII and returned home with serious injuries. After graduating from a secondary school, his first job was working there for one year as a physics teacher in 1961.

In 1962, Gennady enrolled into the Department of Physics and Mathematics of the Oryol Pedagogical Institute. From 1963 to 1966, he served in a Radiation, Chemical, and Biological Intelligence unit of the Group of Soviet Forces in Germany. Zyuganov joined the Communist Party in 1966.

He returned to the teachers' college in 1966. Three years older than most members of his class, he was already a party member and a popular college athlete. On his return, he married his wife, Nadezhda. He completed his degree in 1969.

== CPSU career ==
Zyuganov taught mathematics but soon turned to Communist Party of the Soviet Union work in Oryol Oblast, beginning in 1967. He became the First Secretary of the local Komsomol and the regional chief for ideology and propaganda. He emerged as a popular politician in the area. Among many other functions, Zyuganov organized parties and dances as a local Komsomol leader while he was rising through the ranks of the party. Zyuganov rose to be second secretary, or second in command, of the party in Oryol.

He enrolled at an elite party school in Moscow, the Academy of Social Sciences in 1978, completing his doctor nauk, a post-doctoral degree, in 1980. He then returned to Oryol to become regional party chief for ideology and propaganda until 1983. In 1983, he was given a high-level position in Moscow as an instructor in the Communist Party propaganda department.

Zyuganov emerged as a leading critic of Soviet leader Mikhail Gorbachev's perestroika and glasnost in the party's Agitation and Propaganda division (later the Ideological division), a hotbed of opposition to reform. As the party began to crumble in the late 1980s, Zyuganov took the side of hard-liners against reforms that would ultimately culminate in the end of CPSU rule and the dissolution of the Soviet Union. In May 1991, he published a fiercely critical piece against Alexander Yakovlev on Sovetskaya Rossiya.

== Head of the Communist Party of the Russian Federation ==
Zyuganov wrote several influential papers in the early 1990s attacking Boris Yeltsin and calling for a return to the socialism of the pre-Gorbachev days. In July 1991, he signed the "A Word to the People" declaration on Sovetskaya Rossiya. As the Communist Party of the Soviet Union fell into disarray, Zyuganov helped form the new Communist Party of the Russian Federation (CPRF), and became one of seven secretaries of the new group's Central Committee. In 1993, he became its chairman. Outside observers were surprised by the survival of Zyuganov's Communist Party into the post-Soviet era.

Zyuganov emerged as post-communist Russia's leading opposition leader. He argued that the collapse of the Soviet Union led to a decline in living standards, that economic power was left concentrated in the hands of a tiny share of the population, that violent crime increased, and that the Soviet collapse allowed ethnic groups throughout Russia to embark on campaigns, sometimes violent, to win autonomy.

Russians who felt left behind in the new Russia emerged as Zyuganov's supporters, including a number of workers, clerks, bureaucrats, professionals, and the elderly. As Zyuganov succeeded in combining Communist ideas with Russian nationalism, his new Communist Party of the Russian Federation joined hands with numerous other left-wing and right-wing nationalist forces, forming a common "national-patriotic alliance."

In the 1993 and 1995 parliamentary elections, the newly revitalized Communist Party of the Russian Federation made a strong showing, and Zyuganov emerged as a serious challenger to President Yeltsin.

=== 1996 presidential campaign ===
The results of the second round of the 1996 elections. Red highlighted regions where Zyuganov won

Zyuganov entered the 1996 presidential election, as the standard-bearer of the Russian Communist Party. Co-opting Russian nationalism, he attacked the infiltration of Western ideals into Russian society and portrayed Russia as a great nation that had been dismantled from within by traitors in cahoots with Western capitalists, who sought the dissolution of Soviet power to exploit Russia's boundless resources.

Hungarian-American billionaire George Soros, along with Russian oligarchs such as Boris Berezovsky, Vladimir Gusinsky, Mikhail Khodorkovsky, Anatoly Chubais, and others feared a Communist resurgence in Russia while witnessing Zyuganov present himself as a kinder, gentler Communist while attending the World Economic Forum at Davos in 1996. Chubais recalled, stating "I saw many of my good friends, presidents of major American companies, European companies, who were simply dancing around Zyuganov, trying to catch his eye, peering at him. These were the world's most powerful businessmen, with world famous names, who with their entire appearance demonstrated that they were seeking support of the future president of Russia, because it was clear to everyone that Zyuganov was going to be the future president of Russia, and now they needed to build a relationship with him. So, this shook me up!".

The oligarchs set aside their differences and held several private meetings in Davos hotel rooms, where they strategized how to defeat the perceived Zyuganov threat. The result was the "Davos pact", an agreement between Chubais and the oligarchs that he would lead an anti-Communist campaign against Zyuganov, that they agreed to fund. The subsequent months saw a massive media offensive as "money poured into advertising campaigns, into regional tours, into bribing journalists", all supported by the oligarchs who owned the major media. Yeltsin's subsequent victory in that election can be traced back to the events that took place in Davos between Chubais and those Russian oligarchs.

In the election on 16 June, Zyuganov finished second with 32%, trailing only Yeltsin, who captured 35%. Yeltsin gained from the elimination of the many smaller parties, as well as the support of Alexander Lebed, and eventually won the two-man showdown by 53.8% against 40.7%.

It has been alleged that Yeltsin may not have legitimately won the 1996 presidential election, but instead employed electoral fraud. Some results, largely from Russia's ethnic republics of Tatarstan, Dagestan and Bashkortostan, showed highly unlikely changes in voting patterns between the two rounds of voting. At a meeting with opposition leaders in 2012, then-president Dmitry Medvedev was reported to have said, "There is hardly any doubt who won [that race]. It was not Boris Nikolaevich Yeltsin."

=== After 1996 election ===
After the December 1999 parliamentary elections, the number of Communist seats in the Duma was reduced. Communist support started to decline, given the widespread electoral support at the time for the government's invasion of Chechnya in September 1999 and the popularity of Yeltsin's new prime minister, Vladimir Putin, who was widely seen as Yeltsin's heir apparent.

=== 2000 presidential campaign ===
Zyuganov placed a distant second behind Vladimir Putin in the March 2000 presidential election.

=== After 2000 election ===
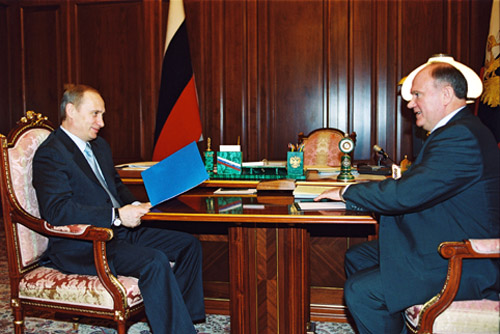
Vladimir Putin and Zyuganov

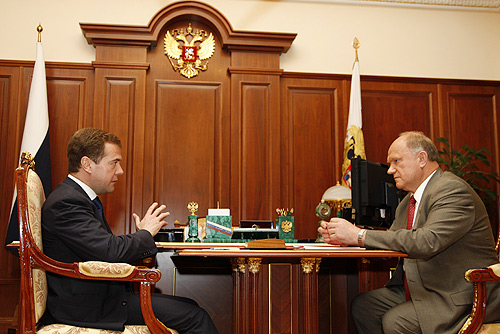
Dmitry Medvedev and Zyuganov

Zyuganov has additionally served as the Chairman of the Union of Communist Parties – Communist Party of the Soviet Union (UCP-CPSU) since 2001, replacing Oleg Shenin.

In November 2001, in an open letter to Putin ahead of the summit between the US and Russian presidents in the United States, Zyuganov said that Russia was betraying its national interests. "It is blindly following US policy which has been characterized recently by open aggression". Zyuganov criticized Putin for his decision the previous month to close a Cuban listening post that eavesdropped on US communications and a key naval base in Vietnam, as well as Russian support for Washington using bases in former Soviet Uzbekistan and Tajikistan for its Afghan strikes. "Russia's national state and national interests may be betrayed" at the upcoming summit between Putin and US President George W. Bush, Zyuganov warned.

On 23 September 2003, Zyuganov sent a deputy request to the Prosecutor General's Office and the Central Election Commission of the Russian Federation, in which he demanded to initiate an administrative case against Putin as an official of category "A" and to fine him in the amount of 22,500 rubles for conducting election campaigning outside the campaign period of the United Russia party. However, the Chairman of the Central Election Commission of the Russian Federation, Alexander Veshnyakov, and the Chairman of the Federation Council, Sergey Mironov, objected that they did not see anything illegal in the President's speech. The head of the Communist Party of the Russian Federation tried to file a complaint with higher authorities, but not a single court examined the complaint on its merits.

In 2004, Zyuganov declined to run against Putin, who secured a landslide reelection victory.

=== 2008 presidential campaign ===
In October 2005, Zyuganov indicated that he would run for president in 2008, making him the second person to enter the race for the Kremlin following former Prime Minister Mikhail Kasyanov. According to one report, Zyuganov pledged to quadruple pensions and state salaries, should he be elected.

In the presidential election on 2 March 2008, Zyuganov garnered 17.76% of the vote and came in second to Medvedev's 70.23%.

=== Post-2008 ===
On Zyuganov's 65th birthday in June 2009, the then Prime Minister Vladimir Putin presented him with a copy of the first Soviet edition of the Communist Manifesto. On the occasion of Soviet leader Joseph Stalin's birthday on 21 December 2010, Zyuganov called for the re-Stalinization of Russian society in an open letter to President Medvedev.

After Putin's annual address to parliament on 20 April 2011, Zyuganov criticised it as inadequate in dealing with Russia's economic decline and warned that, "If the [parliamentary and presidential] elections are as dirty as before, the situation will develop along the North African scenario." Zyuganov denounced election irregularities in the Russian legislative election of 2011 but also expressed his opposition to the organizers of the mass demonstrations of December 2011 who he viewed as liberals who exploited unrest.

The communist party played only a minor role in the protests, with one of its speakers, who called for restoration of Soviet power, being booed off the stage. Party rallies on 18 December 2011, in protest of election irregularities in Moscow and St. Petersburg were attended by only a few thousand, mostly elderly, party supporters. According to The New York Times, it is questionable that Zyuganov, due to his age and association with Soviet policies, will be able to capitalize on the opportunity presented by popular disgust with the Putin regime, or mobilize mass popular support for his party.

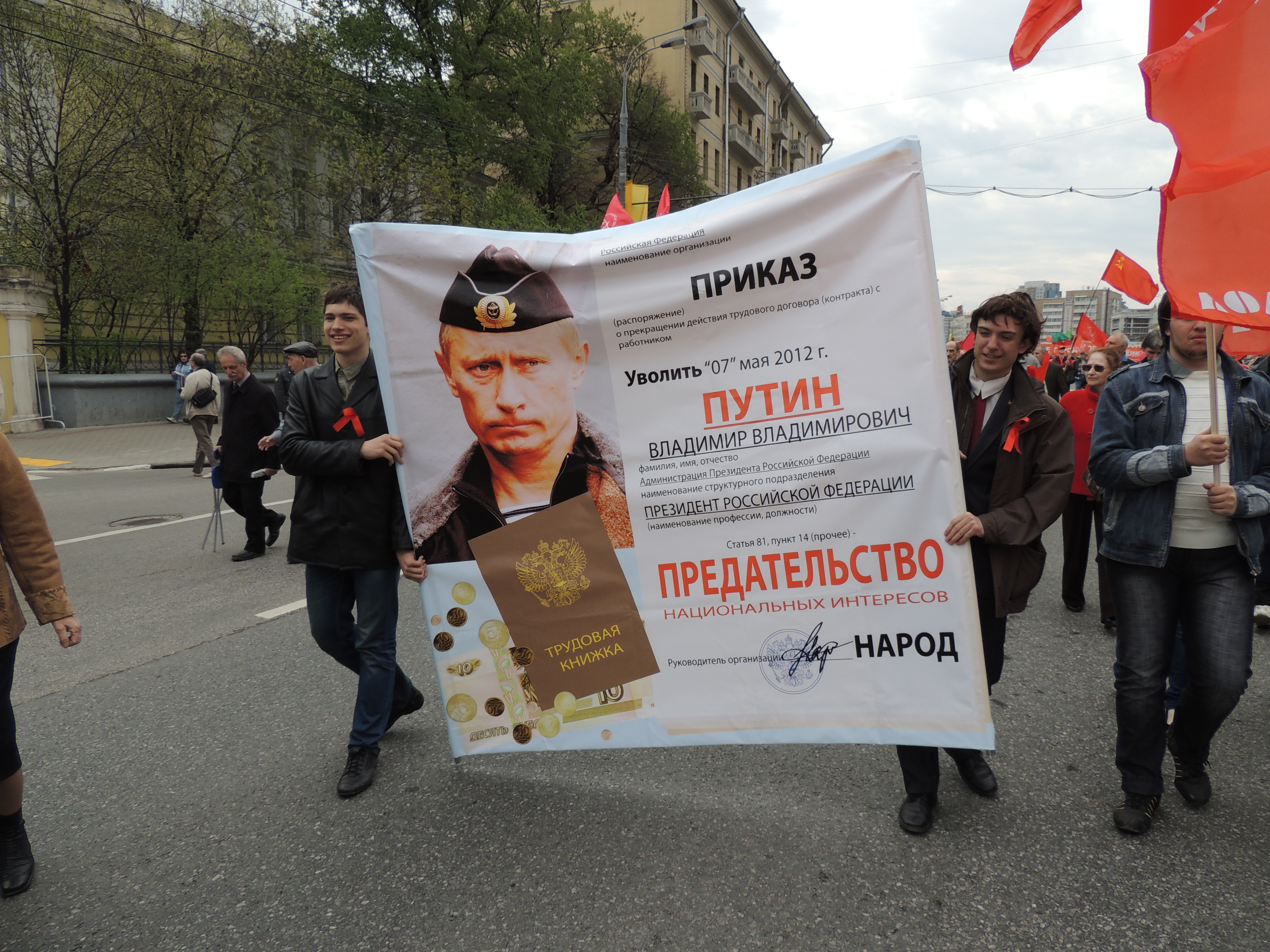
Communist protesters with a sign portraying an "order of dismissal" for Vladimir Putin for "betrayal of the national interests", Moscow, 1 May 2012.

Zyuganov is a harsh critic of President Vladimir Putin, but states that his recipes for Russia's future are true to his Soviet roots. Zyuganov hopes to renationalise all major industries and he believes the USSR was "the most humane state in human history". On 29 November 2008, in his speech before the 13th Party Congress, Zyuganov made these remarks about the state that Russia under Putin was in:

Objectively, Russia's position remains complicated, not to say dismal. The population is dying out. Thanks to the "heroic efforts" of the Yeltsinites the country has lost 5 out of the 22 million square kilometers of its historical territory. Russia has lost half of its production capacity and has yet to reach the 1990 level of output. Our country is facing three mortal dangers: de-industrialization, de-population and mental debilitation. The ruling group has neither notable successes to boast of, nor a clear plan of action. All its activities are geared to a single goal: to stay in power at all costs. Until recently it has been able to keep in power due to the "windfall" high world prices for energy. Its social support rests on the notorious "vertical power structure" which is another way of saying intimidation and blackmail of the broad social strata and the handouts that power chips off the oil and gas pie and throws out to the population in crumbs, especially on the eve of elections.

The CPRF cherishes the rule of Joseph Stalin. Zyuganov and the party support social conservatism and voted in favor of the ban on the "promotion of non-traditional sexual relations to minors", commonly known as the Russian gay propaganda law.

=== 2012 presidential campaign ===
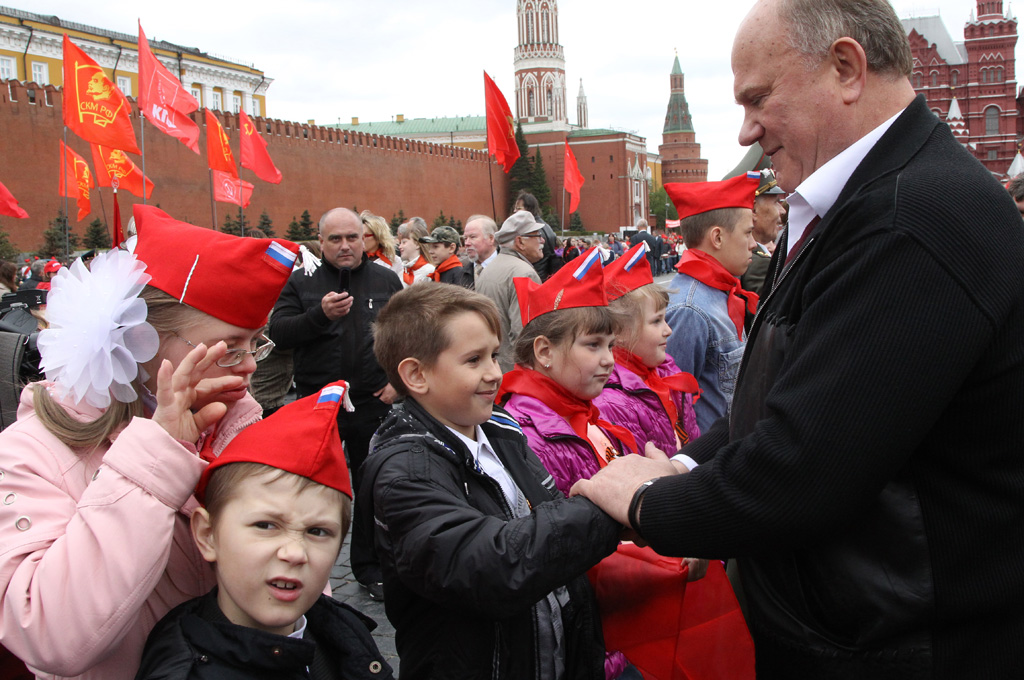
Zyuganov campaigning on Red Square

In September 2011, Zyuganov again became the CPRF's candidate for the 2012 presidential election. According to Zyuganov, "a gang of folks who cannot do anything in life apart from dollars, profits and mumbling, has humiliated the country" and called for a new international alliance to "counter the aggressive policies of imperialist circles."

In the 2012 Russian presidential election on 4 March 2012, Zyuganov once again came in second place by receiving 17% of the vote.

== Political views ==
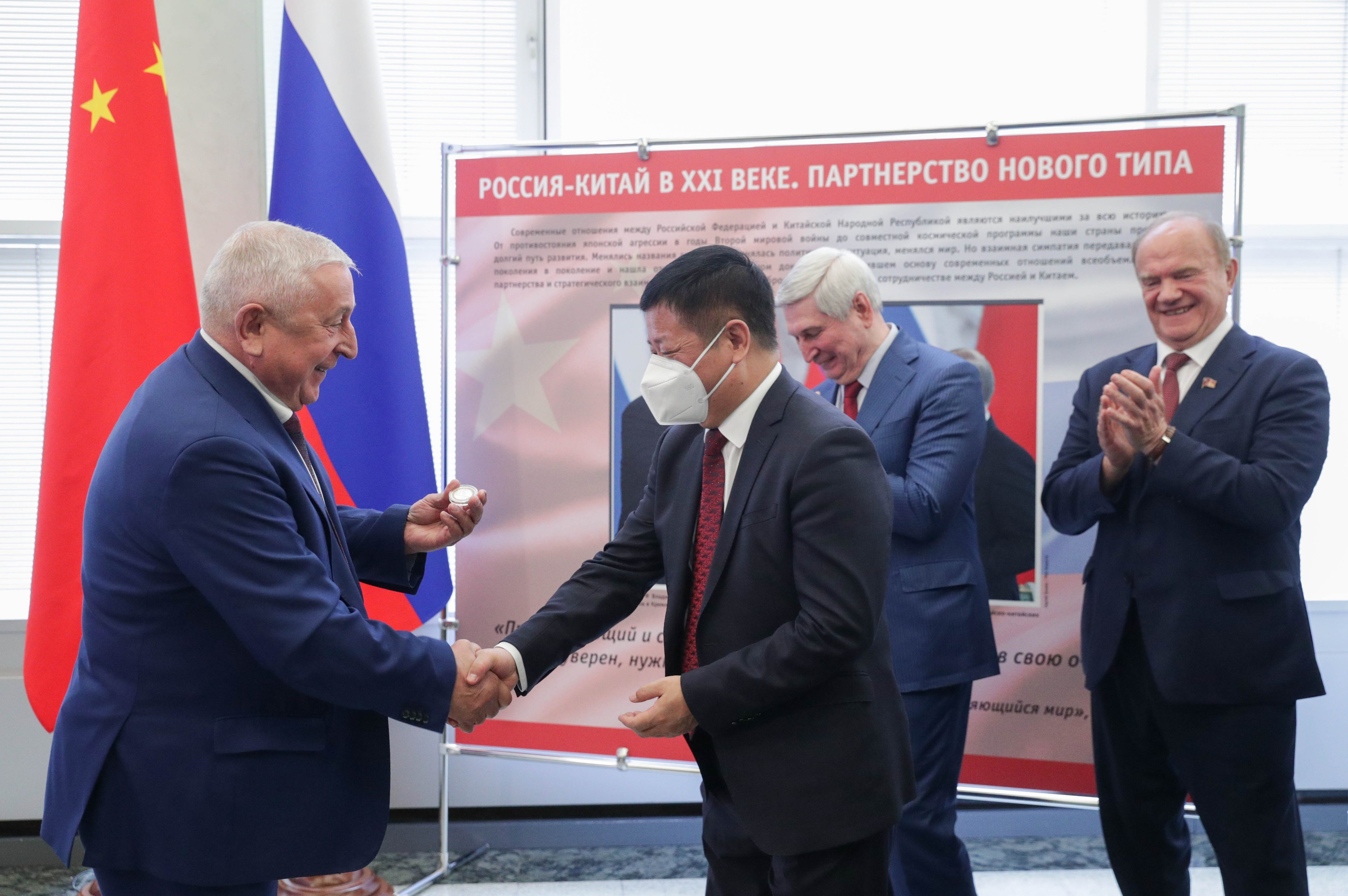
Zyuganov in the background of Nikolay Kharitonov meeting with Zhang Hanhui in June 2021

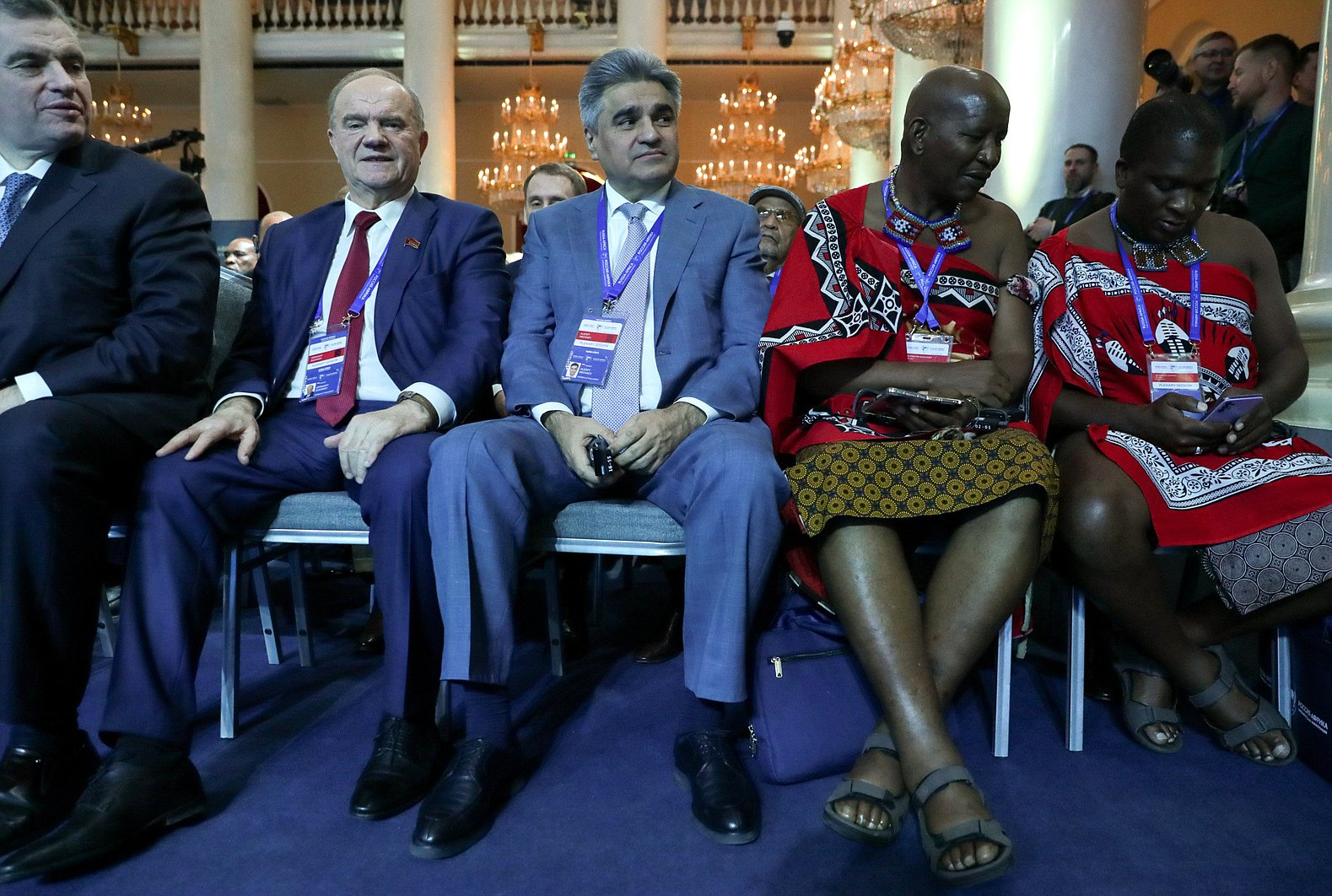
Zyuganov, Alexey Nechayev and Leonid Slutsky at the "Russia-Africa" parliamentary conference in Moscow on 20 March 2023

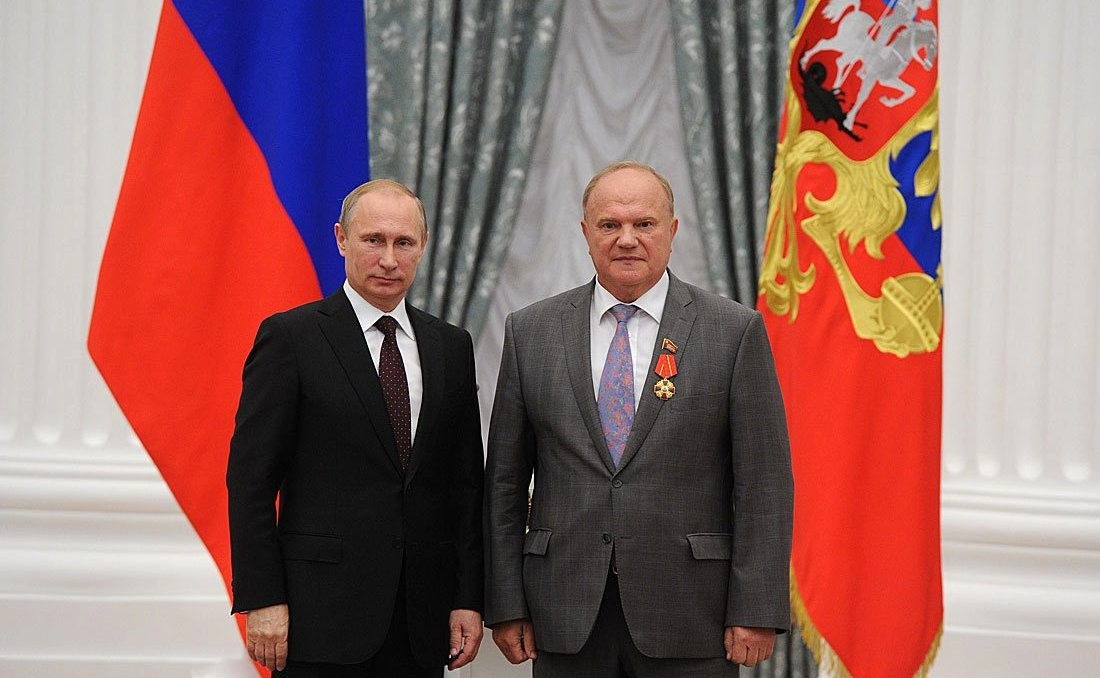
Zyuganov receiving the Order of Alexander Nevsky from Vladimir Putin in 2014

According to Zyuganov, Jesus Christ was the first communist, stating that the Bible may be read through a socialist perspective.

After Russia was sanctioned for systematic doping in the run-up to the 2018 Winter Olympics, Zyuganov proposed sending Russian fans to the Games with a Soviet Victory Banner.

He is considered by Russian scholars as a neo-Eurasianist.

Reacting to the death of Mikhail Gorbachev in August 2022, Zyuganov declared Gorbachev was a leader whose rule brought "absolute sadness, misfortune and problems [for] all the peoples of our country".

In April 2026, Zyuganov warned that worsening economic conditions in Russia, including high inflation and declining living standards, could trigger unrest in the population.

=== Ukraine ===
Following the 2022 Russian invasion of Ukraine, the CPRF published a statement in support of the invasion and accused NATO of planning "to enslave Ukraine" and thus creating "critical threats to the security of Russia". It called for the "demilitarization and denazification" of Ukraine.

The party officially supported the state-promoted narrative that Ukraine is governed by Ukrainian Banderites and "neo-Nazis", who have been allegedly perpetrating genocide against Russian speakers of the separatist Donetsk and Luhansk People's Republics, and liberating Russian forces. The CPRF also accused the United States and NATO of deploying European fascist sympathizers and Middle Eastern terrorists to Ukraine to fight the Russian army. Two members out of 57 of CPRF's Duma caucus, Vyacheslav Markhayev and Mikhail Matveev, have expressed opposition to the war, although they support the "protection of the people of Donbass".

Some younger members of the CPRF spoke publicly against the war, condemning it as "imperialist" and contrary to Marxist–Leninist principles. In September 2022, Zyuganov called in the State Duma for a general mobilization.

== Personal life ==
His wife, Nadezhda Zyuganova (née Amelicheva) graduated from History Department of Oryol Pedagogical Institute. They have two children. They have seven grandsons and one granddaughter.

=== Sanctions ===
In February 2022, Zyuganov, who voted for the 2022 Russian invasion of Ukraine, was placed on the sanctions list by the United States, Canada, Japan, United Kingdom, Australia and the European Union.

== See also ==
- Architect amidst the Ruins
- A Word to the People

== Notes ==
Honorary titles
Preceded by Oleg Shenin	First Secretary of the Central Committee of the Union of Communist Parties; 2001–present	Incumbent
Party political offices
Preceded by Valentin Kuptsov	First Secretary of the Central Committee of the Communist Party of the Russian Federation; 1993–present	Incumbent
Preceded by Nikolai Ryzhkov	Communist Party presidential candidate 1996 (2 rnd), 2000	Succeeded by Nikolay Kharitonov
Preceded by Nikolay Kharitonov	Communist Party presidential candidate 2008, 2012	Succeeded by Pavel Grudinin
