= Yuri Bondarev =

Russian writer (1924–2020)

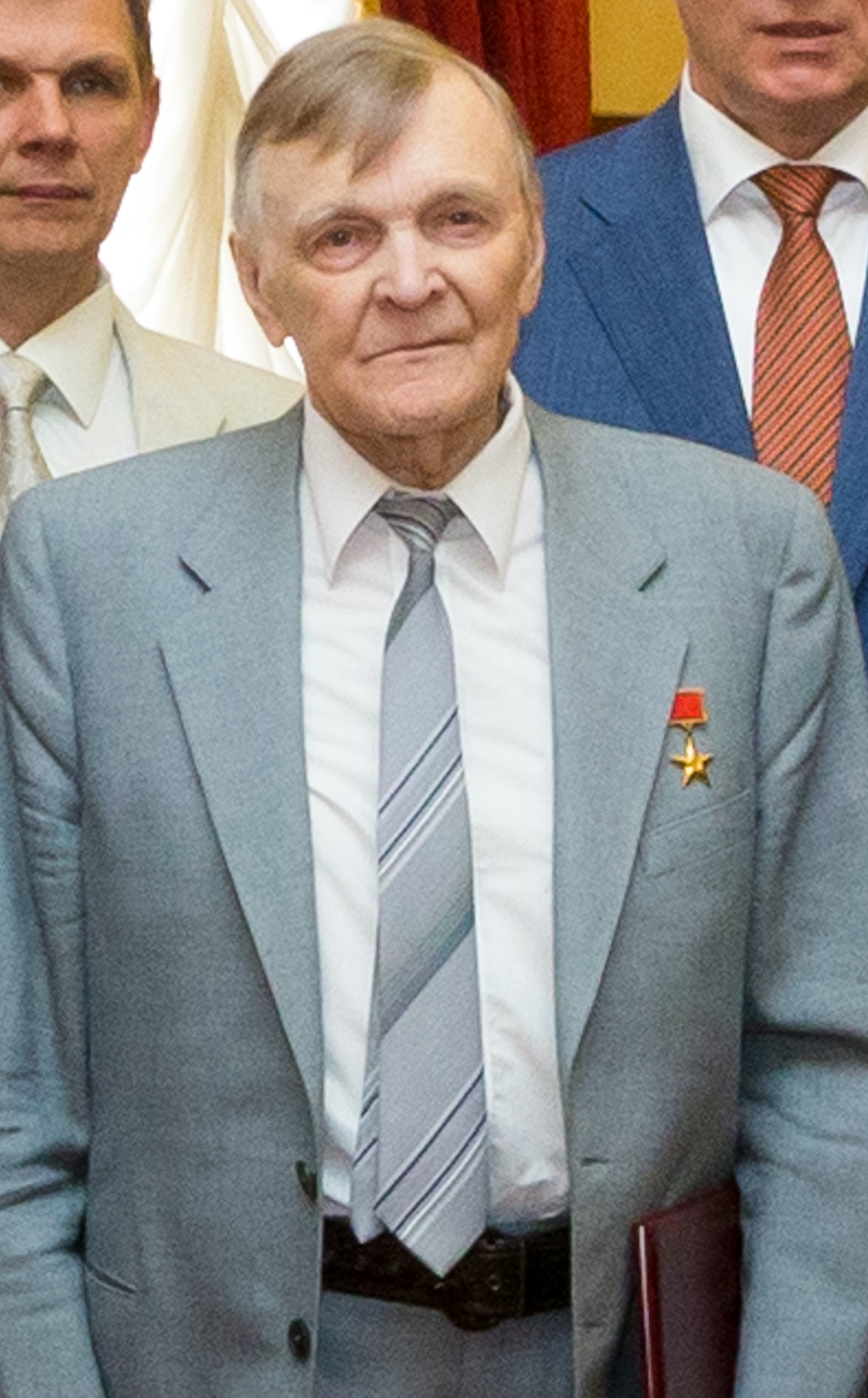
- Bondarev in 2014
- Born: Yuri Vasilyevich Bondarev; 15 March 1924; Orsk, Soviet Union
- Died: 29 March 2020 (aged 96); Moscow, Russia
- Writing career
- Years active: 1953–2020
- Genres: Novel, short story, essay, social realism, lieutenant prose

Yuri Vasilyevich Bondarev (Russian: Юрий Васильевич Бондарев, 15 March 1924 — 29 March 2020) was a Soviet and Russian writer and screenwriter. He was best known for co-authoring the script for the serial film franchise Liberation (1968–71). He served as chairman of the Union of Writers of Russia from 1991 to 1994 before being replaced by Valery Ganichev.

== Biography ==
Bondarev took part in World War II as an artillery officer and became a member of the CPSU in 1944. He graduated in 1951 from the Maxim Gorky Literature Institute. His first collection of stories entitled On a Large River was published in 1953.

His first successes in literature, the novels The Battalions Request Fire (1957) and The Last Salvoes (1959) were part of a new trend of war fiction which dispensed with pure heroes and vile villains in favor of emphasizing the true human cost of war. The Last Salvos was adapted for the cinema in 1961. His next novels Silence (1962), The Two (1964) and Relatives (1969) established him as a leading Soviet writer. His novel Silence became a landmark as the first work to depict a citizen who had been wrongly sentenced to the Gulag. His novels generally cover topics of ethics and personal choices.

In the novel The Hot Snow (1969) he again used the theme of war, creating an epic canvas dealing with the Battle of Stalingrad from the viewpoint of its many participants including common soldiers and military commanders. In his novel The Shore (1975), a Soviet writer learns that a German woman, with whom he had a passionate love affair as a young officer, still loves him. He dies before reaching the promised "shore" of his youthful dream. In The Choice (1980) a terminally ill expatriate kills himself on a visit to Moscow so that he can be buried in the city of his youth. His fate causes an old Soviet friend of his to engage in a painful exploration of existential questions.

Bondarev did also much work for the cinema. Besides adapting his own novels for the screen, he co-authored the script for the serial film Liberation.

In political life during the early 1990s, Bondarev participated in Russia's national-communist opposition politics, belonging to the National Salvation Front leadership. Bondarev was a member of the central committee of the hardline Communist Party of the RSFSR at the end of the Mikhail Gorbachev era; in July 1991 he signed the anti-Perestroika declaration "A Word to the People".

Bondarev died on 29 March 2020 in Moscow at the age of 96.

== Awards ==
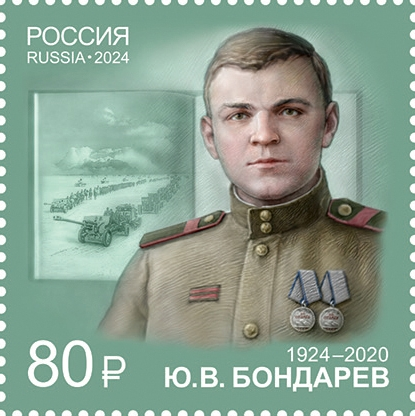
Bondarev on a 2024 stamp of Russia

- Hero of Socialist Labour
- Order of Lenin, twice
- Order of the Red Banner of Labour
- Order of the October Revolution
- Order of the Patriotic War, 2nd class
- Order of the Badge of Honour
- Medal For Courage, twice (14 October 1943, 21 June 1944)
- Honorary Citizen of the Hero City of Volgograd
- Alexander Fadeyev Medal for Military Literature
- State Prize of the USSR, 1977, for his novel The Shore
- State Prize of the USSR, 1983, for his novel The Choice
- State Prize of the RSFSR Vasiliev brothers (1975) – a script for the movie "Hot Snow" (1972)
- Alexander Dovzhenko Gold Medal for the screenplay of The Hot Snow (1972)
- Leo Tolstoy Award for Literature
- Mikhail Sholokov Award for Literature
- Medal "For the Defence of Stalingrad"
- Medal "For the Victory over Germany in the Great Patriotic War 1941–1945"
- Lenin Prize (1972) – script for epic Liberation
- National Award "Stalingrad".
- Medal of the CPRF Central Committee, 90 years of the Great October Socialist Revolution.
- Award CCF (1984) – a script for the film The Coast (1983)

In 1994 he refused to accept the award of Order of Friendship of Peoples from Boris Yeltsin.

== English translations ==
- Silence, Houghton Mifflin, 1966.
- The Last Shots, Foreign Languages Publishing House, 1970.
- The Hot Snow, Progress Publishers, 1976.
- The Vigil, from Anthology of Soviet Short Stories, Vol 2, Progress Publishers, 1976.
- The Shore, Raduga Publishers, 1984.
- The Choice, Raduga Publishers, 1984.
- On Craftsmanship, Raduga Publishers, 1984.

== Filmography (writer) ==
- The Last Salvos (1961)
- Silence (1963)
- Liberation (1968–71)
