= Sovetskaya Rossiya =

Periodical literature

- Format: Broadsheet
- Editor: Valentin Vasilievich Chikin
- Founded: 1 July 1956
- Political alignment: Communism
- Language: Russian
- Headquarters: 24, Pravda Street, Moscow
- Country: Russian SFSR (1956-1991); Russian Federation (since 1991)
- Circulation: 300.000 (as of 2007)
- Website: sovross.ru

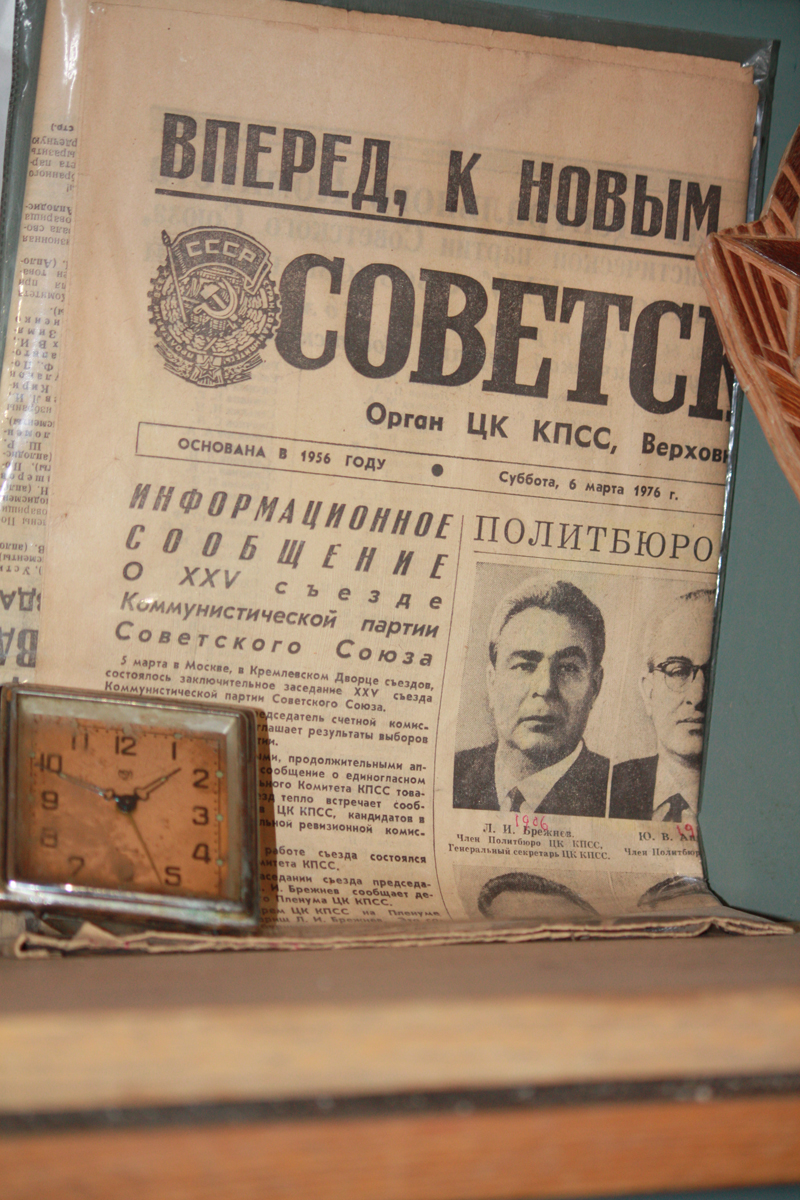
Newspaper from 1976

Sovetskaya Rossiya (Russian: Советская Россия, Soviet Russia) is a political newspaper in Russia. It kept its name after the dissolution of the Soviet Union in December 1991 and presently presents itself as a leftist independent newspaper. Its current editor is MP Valentin Chikin.

== History ==
Sovetskaya Rossiya was first published on July 1, 1956. The war photographer Olga Lander began to work as a photographer here in the year in began. She remained here until her retirement in 1974. when it became the official press organ of the Supreme Soviet and Council of Ministers of the Russian SFSR. The newspaper was published six times a week; in 1975, its circulation was 2,700,000 copies. In 2007, the circulation was 300.000, the newspaper is published three times a week.

== Political tendency ==
The newspaper has friendly ties with the Communist Party. During the time of the Soviet Union, Sovetskaya Rossiya was known for its opposition to Mikhail Gorbachev and support for neo-Stalinism. Notably, it published "A Word to the People", a letter signed by, among others, three of the Gang of Eight who participated in the August Coup against others. It also published "I Cannot Forsake My Principles", a Stalinist critique of Gorbachev.

== Rossiya Tournament ==
The newspaper arranged the Rossiya Tournament, an international bandy competition held every other year in Russia in 1972-1990. This tournament lived on for another two decades, but from 1992 it was called the Russian Government Cup and was arranged by the Russian government instead.
