= Oleg Shenin =

Soviet politician (1937–2009)

- Олег Шенин
- Shenin in 1993

Chairman of the Communist Party of the Soviet Union (2001)
- In office 22 January 2001 – 28 May 2009
- Preceded by: None
- Succeeded by: Vladimir Berezin

Chairman of the Council of the Union of Communist Parties
- In office 26 March 1993 – 22 January 2001
- Preceded by: Vladimir Ivashko (Acting General Secretary of the Central Committee of the CPSU in 1991)
- Succeeded by: Gennady Zyuganov

Full member of the 28th Politburo
- In office 14 July 1990 – 29 August 1991

Personal details
- Born: 2 July 1937
- Died: 28 May 2009 (aged 71)
- Party: Communist Party of the Soviet Union
- Other political affiliations: Communist Party of the Soviet Union (2001)

Military service
- Allegiance: Soviet Union

Oleg Semyonovich Shenin (Russian: Олег Семёнович Шенин; 2 July 1937 – 28 May 2009) was the leader of the Communist Party of the Soviet Union (2001), which should not be confused with the larger UCP-CPSU.

Shenin was a member of the Central Committee of the Communist Party of the Soviet Union; he was also a member of the Politburo and Secretariat from 1990 to 1991. During the Soviet coup attempt of 1991, he was a member of the group of CPSU CC members who tried to regain control of the country in order to re-establish the Soviet Union. On 23 August he was jailed for his involvement in the events. In October 1992, for health reasons, he was released with a change in the preventive measure to a recognizance not to leave. He was given amnesty in 1994.

Shenin was the founding Chairman of the Union of Communist Parties - Communist Party of the Soviet Union (UCP-CPSU) from 1993, until he broke away from the Communist Party of the Russian Federation (CPRF) in 2001, after its leader Gennady Zyuganov refused to back the creation of a united Communist Party of Russia and Belarus. Zyuganov then replaced Shenin as chairman of the Council of the Union of Communist Parties-CPSU.

In September 1997, he met with North Korean leader Kim Jong-il in Pyongyang.

== Presidential campaign ==
Shenin applied to run as a presidential candidate for the 2008 Russian presidential election but was denied registration for failing to complete some paperwork correctly. According to Shenin, his candidacy was rejected because he did not provide a letter from his employer; he described this as an "idiotic pretext" because he had been retired for years.

== Death ==
Shenin died on 28 May 2009 aged 71 from a severe and prolonged illness.
