= Soviet empire =

Term for Soviet foreign policy before 1989

1959 world map of alignments: Warsaw Pact member states Other allies of the USSR NATO member states Other allies of the US Colonized countries Non-aligned nations

The countries of the Warsaw Pact

The term "Soviet empire" collectively refers to the world's territories that the Soviet Union dominated politically, economically, and militarily. This phenomenon, particularly in the context of the Cold War, is used by Sovietologists to describe the extent of the Soviet Union's hegemony over the Second World.

In a wider sense, the term refers to Soviet foreign policy during the Cold War, which has been characterized as imperialist: the nations which were part of the "Soviet empire" were nominally independent countries with separate governments that set their own policies, but those policies had to stay within certain limits decided by the Soviet Union. These limits were enforced by the threat of intervention by Soviet forces, and later the Warsaw Pact. Major military interventions took place in East Germany in 1953, Hungary in 1956, Czechoslovakia in 1968, Poland in 1981–83 and Afghanistan from 1979 to 1989. Countries in the Eastern Bloc were Soviet satellite states.

== Characteristics ==
Flag of the Soviet Union

Although the Soviet Union was not ruled by an emperor, and declared itself anti-imperialist and a people's democracy, it exhibited tendencies common to historic empires. The notion of "Soviet empire" often refers to a form of "classic" or "colonial" empire with communism only replacing conventional imperial ideologies such as Christianity or monarchy, rather than creating a revolutionary state. Academically the idea is seen as emerging with Richard Pipes' 1957 book The Formation of the Soviet Union: Communism and Nationalism, 1917–1923; it has been reinforced, along with several other views, in continuing scholarship. Several scholars hold that the Soviet Union was a hybrid entity containing elements common to both multinational empires and nation states. The Soviet Union practiced colonialism similar to conventional imperial powers.

The Soviets pursued internal colonialism in Central Asia. For example, the state's prioritized grain production over livestock in Kyrgyzstan, which favored Slavic settlers over the Kyrgyz natives, thus perpetuating the inequalities of the tsarist colonial era. The Maoists argued that the Soviet Union had itself become an imperialist power while maintaining a socialist façade, or social imperialism. While Maoists criticized post-Stalin USSR's imperialism from a hardline communist viewpoint, reformist socialist critics of Soviet imperialism, such as Josip Broz Tito and Milovan Djilas, have referred the Stalinist USSR's foreign policies, such as the occupation and economic exploitations of Eastern Europe and its aggressive and hostile policy towards Yugoslavia as Soviet imperialism. Another dimension of Soviet imperialism is cultural imperialism, the Sovietization of culture and education at the expense of local traditions. Leonid Brezhnev continued a policy of cultural Russification as part of Developed Socialism, which sought to assert more central control. Seweryn Bialer argued that the Soviet state had an imperial nationalism.

A notable wave of Sovietization occurred during the Russian Civil War in the territories captured by the Red Army. Later, the territories occupied by the Russian SFSR and the USSR were Sovietized. Mongolia was invaded by the Soviet Union and Sovietized in the 1920s after it became a Soviet satellite state, and after the end of the Second World War, Sovietization took place in the countries of the Soviet Bloc (Eastern and Central Europe: Czechoslovakia, East Germany, Hungary, Poland, the Baltic states etc.). In a broad sense, it included the involuntary creation of Soviet-style authorities, imitation of elections held under the control of the Bolsheviks with the removal of opposition candidates, nationalization of land and property, repression against representatives of "class enemies" (kulaks, or osadniks, for instance). Mass executions and imprisoning in Gulag labor camps and exile settlements often accompany that process. This was usually promoted and sped up by propaganda aimed at creating a common way of life in all states within the Soviet sphere of influence. In modern history, Sovietization refers to the copying of models of Soviet life (the cult of the leader's personality, collectivist ideology, mandatory participation in propaganda activities, etc.).

From the 1930s through the 1950s, Joseph Stalin ordered population transfers in the Soviet Union, deporting people (often entire nationalities) to underpopulated remote areas, with their place being taken mostly by ethnic Russians and Ukrainians. The policy officially ended in the Khrushchev era, with some of the nationalities allowed to return in 1957. However, Nikita Khrushchev and Leonid Brezhnev refused the right of return for Crimean Tatars, Russian Germans and Meskhetian Turks. In 1991, the Supreme Soviet of Russia declared the Stalinist mass deportations to be a "policy of defamation and genocide".

According to Dag Noren, the Soviet Union's actions in Eastern Europe sought to constitute and reinforce a buffer zone between itself and Western Europe so as to protect itself from potential future attacks from hostile Western European countries. The Soviet Union had lost approximately 20 million people over the course of the Second World War. To prevent a recurrence of such costly warfare, Soviet leaders believed that they needed to establish a hierarchy of political and economic dependence between neighboring states and the USSR.

During the Brezhnev era, the doctrine of developed socialism declared the Soviet Union to have reached a higher stage of socialism in which class contradictions were abolished and the dictatorship of the proletariat had given way to the socialist state of the whole people, explaining the Soviet Union's dominant role and hegemony over the other socialist countries. This and the interventionist Brezhnev Doctrine, permitting the invasion of other socialist countries, led to characterisation of the USSR as an empire.

Soviet influence in countries of socialist orientation was mainly political and ideological rather than economic: the Soviet Union pumped enormous amounts of international assistance into them in order to secure influence. The Soviet Union sought a group of countries which would rally to its cause in the event of an attack from Western countries, and support it in the context of the Cold War. After the dissolution of the Soviet Union, the Russian Federation was recognized as its successor state, inheriting $103 billion of Soviet foreign debt and $140 billion of Soviet assets abroad.

Economic expansion did, however, play a significant role in Soviet motivation to spread influence in its satellite territories. These new territories would ensure an increase in the global wealth which the Soviet Union would have a grasp on.

Soviet officials from the Russian Soviet Federative Socialist Republic intertwined this economic opportunity with a potential for migration. They saw in these Eastern European countries the potential of a great workforce. They offered a welcome to them upon the only condition that they work hard and achieve social success. This ideology was shaped on the model of the meritocratic, 19th-century American foreign policy.

=== Formal or informal empire ===
Scholars discussing Soviet empire have discussed it as a formal empire or informal empire. In a more formal interpretation of "Soviet empire", this meant absolutism, resembling Lenin's description of the tsarist empire as a "prison of the peoples" except that this "prison of the peoples" had been actualized during Stalin's regime after Lenin's death. Thomas Winderl wrote "The USSR became in a certain sense more a prison-house of nations than the old Empire had ever been."

Another view sees the Soviet empire as constituting an "informal empire" over nominally sovereign states in the Warsaw Pact due to Soviet pressure and military presence. The Soviet informal empire depended on subsidies from Moscow. The informal empire in the wider Warsaw Pact also included linkages between Communist Parties. Some historians consider a more multinational-oriented Soviet Union emphasizing its socialist initiatives, such as Ian Bremmer, who describes a "matryoshka-nationalism" where a pan-Soviet nationalism included other nationalisms. Eric Hobsbawn argued that the Soviet Union had effectively designed nations by drawing borders. Dmitri Trenin wrote that by 1980, the Soviet Union had formed both a formal and informal empire.

The informal empire would have included Soviet economic investments, military occupation, and covert action in Soviet-aligned countries. The studies of informal empire have included Soviet influence on East Germany and 1930s Xinjiang. From the 1919 Karakhan Manifesto to 1927, diplomats of the Soviet Union would promise to revoke concessions in China, but the Soviets secretly kept tsarist concessions such as the Chinese Eastern Railway, as well as consulates, barracks, and churches. After the Sino-Soviet conflict (1929), the Soviet Union regained the Russian Empire's concession of the Chinese Eastern Railway and held it until its return to China in 1952.

Alexander Wendt suggested that by the time of Stalin's Socialism in one country alignment, socialist internationalism "evolved into an ideology of control rather than revolution under the rubric of socialist internationalism" internally within the Soviet Union. By the start of the Cold War it evolved into a "coded power language" that was once again international, but applied to the Soviet informal empire. At times the USSR signaled toleration of policies of satellite states indirectly, by declaring them consistent or inconsistent with socialist ideology, essentially recreating a hegemonic role. Wendt argued that a "hegemonic ideology" could continue to motivate actions after the original incentives were removed, and argued this explains the "zeal of East German Politburo members who chose not to defend themselves against trumped-up charges during the 1950s purges."

Analyzing the dissolution of the Soviet Union, Koslowski and Kratochwil argued that a postwar Soviet "formal empire" represented by the Warsaw Pact, with Soviet military role and control over of member states' foreign relations, had evolved into an informal suzerainty or "Ottomanization" from the late 1970s to 1989. With Gorbachev's relinquishing of the Brezhnev Doctrine in 1989, the informal empire reduced in pressure to a more conventional sphere of influence, resembling Finlandization but applied to the erstwhile East Bloc states, until the Soviet fall in 1991. By contrast "Austrianization" would have been a realist model of great power politics by which the Soviets would have hypothetically relied on Western guarantees to keep an artificial Soviet sphere of influence. The speed of reform in the 1989 to 1991 period made both a repeat of Finlandization and Austrianization impossible for the Soviet Union.

== Communist states aligned with the Soviet Union ==
The Soviet Union is seen in red while states in light pink were satellites. Yugoslavia, a Soviet ally from 1945 to 1948 and non-aligned state thereafter, is marked in purple. Albania, a state which ceased being allied to the Soviet Union in the 1960s after the Sino-Soviet split, is marked in orange.

=== Warsaw Pact ===
These countries were the closest allies of the Soviet Union and were also members of the Comecon, a Soviet-led economic community founded in 1949. The members of the Warsaw Pact, sometimes called the Eastern Bloc, were widely viewed as Soviet satellite states. These countries were occupied (or formerly occupied) by the Red Army, and their politics, military, foreign and domestic policies were dominated by the Soviet Union. The Warsaw Pact included the following states:

- People's Socialist Republic of Albania (1946–1968) (Note: Following the Albanian–Soviet split and the withdrawal from the Warsaw Pact (1968))
- People's Republic of Bulgaria (1946–1990)
- (Czechoslovakia) Czechoslovak Socialist Republic (1948–1990)
- (East Germany) German Democratic Republic (1949–1990)
- (Hungary) Hungarian People's Republic (1949–1989)
- (Poland) Polish People's Republic (1947–1989)
- Socialist Republic of Romania (1947–1965) (Note: After Nicolae Ceaușescu's refusal to participate in the Warsaw Pact invasion of Czechoslovakia in 1968 (see de-satellization of Communist Romania). Remained as member of Comecon and Warsaw Pact until 1989.)

=== Soviet Union ===
In addition to having a permanent seat in the United Nations Security Council, the Soviet Union had two of its union republics in the United Nations General Assembly:

- Byelorussian Soviet Socialist Republic
- Ukrainian Soviet Socialist Republic

A special case were Estonia, Latvia, and Lithuania, three countries occupied and annexed by the Soviet Union in 1940–1941 and 1944–1991 (see Occupation of the Baltic states):

- Estonian Soviet Socialist Republic
- Latvian Soviet Socialist Republic
- Lithuanian Soviet Socialist Republic

=== Other Marxist–Leninist states ===
These countries were Marxist-Leninist states who were allied with the Soviet Union, but were not part of the Warsaw Pact.

- Democratic Republic of Afghanistan (1978–1991)
- People's Republic of Angola (1975–1991) (Note: With the Soviet intervention in the Angolan Civil War.)
- People's Republic of Benin (1975–1990)
- Burkina Faso (1983–1987)
- Chinese Soviet Republic (1931–1937)
- People's Republic of China (1949–1961) (Note: Followed by the Sino-Soviet split.)
- People's Republic of the Congo (1969–1991)
- Republic of Cuba (1959–1991)
- Provisional Military Government of Socialist Ethiopia, then People's Democratic Republic of Ethiopia (1974–1991)
- (Cambodia) People's Republic of Kampuchea (1979–1989)
- People's Revolutionary Government of Grenada (1979–1983)
- (North Korea) Democratic People's Republic of Korea (1948–1991, also allied with China) (Note: After Chinese intervention in the Korean War in 1950, North Korea remained a Soviet ally, but rather used the Juche ideology to balance Chinese and Soviet influence, pursuing a highly isolationist foreign policy and not joining the Comecon or any other international organization of communist states following the withdrawal of Chinese troops in 1958.)
- Lao People's Democratic Republic (1975–1991)
- Democratic Republic of Madagascar (1975–1990)
- (Mongolia) Mongolian People's Republic (1924–1991)
- People's Republic of Mozambique (1975–1990)
- Tuvan People's Republic (1921–1944) (Note: It was absorbed by the Soviet Union in 1944, and became part of the RSFSR.)
- Democratic Republic of Vietnam (1950–1976); Provisional Revolutionary Government of the Republic of South Vietnam (1969–1976); and Socialist Republic of Vietnam (1976–1991)
- (South Yemen) People's Democratic Republic of Yemen (1967–1990)
- (Socialist Federal Republic of Yugoslavia) Federal People's Republic of Yugoslavia (1945–1948) (Note: Ended affiliation with the Soviet Union in 1948 due to Tito–Stalin split. After Joseph Stalin's death and the repudiation of his policies by Nikita Khrushchev, peace was made with Josip Broz Tito and Yugoslavia, although relations between the two countries were never completely rebuilt. See also the Informbiro period.)

== Non-communist states aligned with the Soviet Union ==
States that had communist governments States that the Soviet Union believed at one point to be moving toward socialism Other states allied with the Soviet Union at some point

Some countries in the Third World had pro-Soviet governments during the Cold War. In the political terminology of the Soviet Union, these were "countries moving along the socialist road of development" as opposed to the more advanced "countries of developed socialism" which were mostly located in Eastern Europe, but that also included Cuba and Vietnam. They received some aid, either military or economic, from the Soviet Union and were influenced by it to varying degrees. Sometimes, their support for the Soviet Union eventually stopped for various reasons and in some cases the pro-Soviet government lost power while in other cases the same government remained in power, but ultimately ended its alliance with the Soviet Union.

- Algeria (1962–1991)
- People's Republic of Bangladesh (1972–1975) (Note: Ended with the assassination of Sheikh Mujibur Rahman, which led to a brief instability, culminating in the accession of Ziaur Rahman, who fostered Islamization)
- (Myanmar) Burma (1962–1988) (Note: Ended with the 8888 uprising which saw the rule of the Burma Socialist Programme Party being replaced by the State Law and Order Restoration Council)
- Cape Verde (1975–1990)
- Chile (1970–1973) (Note: Ended with the 1973 Chilean coup d'état, leading to the rise of Augusto Pinochet)
- (Taiwan) Republic of China (KMT) (1921–1927) (Note: Following the death of Sun Yat-sen & the rise of Chiang Kai-shek, the Kuomintang was alienated from the Soviets)
- Egypt (1954–1974) (Note: Ended following the Israeli victory in the Yom Kippur War & the ascendancy of Anwar Sadat)
- Ghana (1964–1966) (Note: Ended with the 1966 Ghanaian coup d'état, culminating in the rise of Joseph Arthur Ankrah)
- Guinea (1960–1984) (Note: Ended with the 1984 Guinean coup d'état, culminating in the rise of Lansana Conté)
- (Guinea-Bissau) Guinea Bissau (1973–1991)
- Equatorial Guinea (1968–1979) (Note: Ended with the 1979 Equatorial Guinea coup d'état, culminating in the rise of Teodoro Obiang Nguema Mbasogo)
- Guyana (1966–1991)
- India (1971–1991)
- Indonesia (1959–1965) (Note: Ended with the failed 1965 Indonesian coup d'état)
- Iraq (1958–1963; 1968–1979) (Note: Ended with the 1979 Ba'ath Party Purge.)
- Israel (1948–1953)
- Libya (1969–1991)
- Mali (1960–1991)
- Mauritania (1961–1984) (Note: Ended with the rise of Maaouya Ould Sid'Ahmed Taya)
- Nicaragua (1979–1990) (Note: Ended with the defeat of the Sandinista National Liberation Front & the country's transition to democracy)
- Peru (1968–1975) (Note: Ended with the 1975 Peruvian coup d'état)
- Sahrawi Arab Democratic Republic (1976–1991)
- Sao Tome and Principe (1975–1991)
- Seychelles (1977–1991)
- (Somalia) Somali Democratic Republic (1969–1977) (Note: At the outbreak of the Somali invasion of Ethiopia in 1977, the Soviet Union ceased to support Somalia, with the corresponding change in rhetoric. In turn, Somalia broke diplomatic relations with the Soviet Union and the United States adopted Somalia as a Cold War ally.)
- Sudan (1969–1971) (Note: Ended with the failed 1971 Sudanese coup d'état)
- Syria (1958–1961; 1963–1991)
- Tanzania (1964–1985) (Note: Ended with the rise of Ali Hassan Mwinyi)
- Second East Turkestan Republic (1944–1949) (Note: Declared independence from the Republic of China in 1944, annexed by the PRC in 1949.)
- Turkey (1923–1945) (Note: Ended with Turkey joining NATO)
- Uganda (1969–1971) (Note: Ended with the 1971 Ugandan coup d'état, culminating in the rise of Idi Amin)
- Yemen Arab Republic (1962–1972) (Note: Ended with the outbreak of First Yemenite War, where North Yemen invaded South Yemen, a communist state.)
- Zambia (1964–1991)
- Zimbabwe (1980–1991)

== Communist states opposed to the Soviet Union ==
Some communist states were opposed to the Soviet Union and criticized many of its policies. Although they may have had many similarities to the USSR on domestic issues, they were not considered Soviet allies in international politics. Relations between them and the Soviet Union were often tense, sometimes even to the point of armed conflict.

- Albania (1960–1991) (Note: Due to the Sino-Soviet split, followed by the Sino-Albanian split)
- China (1961–1989) (Note: See Sino-Soviet split)
- Romania (1965–1989) (Note: Romania started to increasingly emphasize its unique position within the Eastern Bloc, centering around the dispute over Bessarabia & nationalistic rhetoric.)
- Somalia (1977–1991) (Note: Somali-Soviet ties were irreparably damaged due to the Soviets siding with Ethiopia in the Ogeden War. Somalia adopted a new constitution in 1978, incorporating Islamic elements into the existing communist framework, which was labelled as scientific socialism.)
- Yugoslavia (1948–1955) (Note: The two countries went through a very hostile Informbiro period after the Tito–Stalin split in 1948 and partially rapproached after the Belgrade declaration in 1955, although the latter failed to result in a lasting change after the Soviet invasion of Hungary in 1956 and Czechoslovakia in 1968. Yugoslavia remained highly wary of a possible invasion itself from the Soviet Union during the government of Joseph Stalin after 1948.)

== Neutral states ==
=== Finland ===
The position of Finland was complex. The Soviet Union invaded Finland on 30 November 1939, launching the Winter War. The Soviets intended to install their Finnish Democratic Republic puppet government into Helsinki and annex Finland into the Soviet Union. Fierce Finnish resistance prevented the Soviets from achieving this objective, and the Moscow Peace Treaty was signed on 12 March 1940, with hostilities ending the following day.

Finland would re-enter the Second World War when they invaded the Soviet Union alongside Germany in late June 1941. Finland reclaimed all territory lost in the Winter War, and would proceed to occupy additional territory in East Karelia. The Soviet Vyborg–Petrozavodsk offensive of 1944 pushed Finland out of this territory, but Finland halted the offensive at the Battle of Tali-Ihantala. The Moscow Armistice brought the Continuation War to an end. Finland retained most of its territory and its market economy, trading on the Western markets and ultimately joining the Western currency system.

Nevertheless, although Finland was considered neutral, the Finno-Soviet Treaty of 1948 significantly limited Finnish freedom of operation in foreign policy. It required Finland to defend the Soviet Union from attacks through its territory, which in practice prevented Finland from joining NATO, and effectively gave the Soviet Union a veto in Finnish foreign policy. Thus, the Soviet Union could exercise "imperial" hegemonic power even towards a neutral state. Under the Paasikivi–Kekkonen doctrine, Finland sought to maintain friendly relations with the Soviet Union, and extensive bilateral trade developed. In the West, this led to fears of the spread of "Finlandization", where Western allies would no longer reliably support the United States and NATO.

== See also ==
- Captive Nations
- Cominform
- Containment
- Foreign relations of the Soviet Union
- Foreign interventions by the Soviet Union
- Russian imperialism
- Russian-occupied territories
- Soviet involvement in regime change
- Stalinism
- Sovietization
- Soviet Union–United States relations
- Western betrayal
