= Program of the Communist Party of the Soviet Union =

The Program of the CPSU was the main document of the Communist Party of the Soviet Union which put forth the strategic plans for internal and external politics of the Party and the Soviet Union as a whole. When the party was known under other names, the program was referred to accordingly, e.g., the Program of the Russian Communist Party (Bolshevik), etc.

The First Program was adopted in 1903, with the main goals set were to abolish tsarism and transfer the power to working class.

The Second Program was adopted in 1917 after the October Revolution with the main goal to build the socialist society in Russia.

The Third Program was adopted in 1961 at the 22nd Congress of the Communist Party of the Soviet Union with the ambitious goal to build communism in 20 years.

The last version of the Program was adopted in 1986 at the 27th Congress of the CPSU. Unlike previous Programs, the 1986 version was the amended 1961 version.
