= Winter Palace Taken =

1954 painting by Soviet artist Vladimir Serov

- Artist: Vladimir Serov
- Year: 1954
- Type: Oil on canvas
- Dimensions: 85 cm × 70 cm (33 in × 28 in)
- Location: Tretyakov Gallery, Moscow

Winter Palace Taken! (also known as Winter Palace Taken without the exclamation mark) is a painting by Soviet artist Vladimir Serov. It depicts the storming of the Provisional Government during the October Armed Uprising in Petrograd. The painting is currently on display at the State Tretyakov Gallery. It is considered one of the artist's best works. The painting is short and simple, without details of the outside world. According to Soviet art historians, it captures an event from the time of revolutionary upheaval. The action takes place on the Jordan stairs of the Winter Palace. At the foot of the stairs the artist depicted two active participants in the struggle for the Provisional Government's residence — a soldier and a militiaman of the Red Guard, which, according to Soviet art historians, embodied the union of the working class and the working peasantry. Among the merits of the canvas: the mastery of revealing characters, careful execution of details, "expressive" simplicity.

Soviet art experts considered Vladimir Serov's painting to be one of the most significant works of art from after the war. Important Soviet art experts like Ivan Astakhov, Sofia Korovkovich, and Andrey Lebedev looked closely at the painting's idea, how it was put together, and its use of color. The painting is still used in history classes in secondary and higher schools in the Russian Federation. During the Soviet period, it was also used in classes for teenagers.

The painting was reflected in the work of individual figures of Russian nonconformist culture and served them to create art objects that ironically interpreted the history of the USSR and its so-called "official art".

== Description ==
The action of the painting Winter Palace Taken! takes place on October 26, 1917 in the interiors of the Winter Palace, which was the seat of the Provisional Government immediately after its capture during the October Uprising in Petrograd. One of the staircases of the Palace, the Jordan Staircase, is depicted as the scene of the action. The staircase is decorated with sculptures and gildings, bronze candlesticks. Traces of the battle that took place here can still be seen on it. On the steps of the staircase there are broken bricks — the result of artillery shelling of the Winter Palace), there are shell casings lying in disorder, an empty machine-gun belt, doctor of art history Andrey Lebedev saw an officer's cap.

At the foot of the stairs, the artist depicted two participants of the battle that had already ended — an armed soldier and a Red Guard militiaman, who, according to Soviet art historians, embodied the union of the working class and the working peasantry. The Petrograd worker's affiliation with the Red Guard is indicated by the red armband on his sleeve, which the artist depicts. According to Lebedev, this is not a chance encounter, but a patrol stationed here to "protect the former citadel of tsarism and the Provisional Government". A soldier lights a Red Guardsman's cigar. Doctor of Art History Sophia Korovkovich believes that this gives the scene a decidedly peaceful character. Doctor of Art History Svetlana Chervonnaya, on the contrary, emphasized the heroism and self-confidence of the figures in the painting, calling them heroes of the new world.

On the top landing of the stairs —deep in the space of the painting— a sailor sits with a rifle in his hands, absorbed in reading a newspaper. Sofia Korovkovich called it a "new Soviet newspaper".

== Background ==
Andrey Lebedev, a doctor of art history, noted that Vladimir Serov's work was generally characterized by a return to the same theme, a desire to solve it more deeply and in a new way.

The artist was interested in the capture of the Winter Palace long before he created the painting Winter Palace Taken! At that time he had already made a large painting The Storming of the Winter Palace with a large number of actors. In the first half of the 1950s, the artist decided to change the interpretation of the theme of the October Armed Uprising. In his opinion, the previous interpretation did not allow for a deep characterization of the psychology of the participants of the event. According to Andrey Lebedev, the artist "tried to deepen the images of the heroes of the historic attack, to show the greatness of the revolution through everyday life". Serov himself spoke about his idea: (Note: Andrey Lebedev cited in his 1965 book on the work of Vladimir Serov, a fragment from an unpublished transcript of the artist's speech at a meeting with him listeners of the lecture hall of the Academy of Arts of the USSR February 5, 1959, which is stored in its archives (Archive of the RAH, v. 8, op. 76, p. 38).)

"I decided to open the topic in a "domestic" way. The battles have subsided. The winter is over. Traces of destruction are everywhere. Somewhere high up on the stairs, next to the sculpture, a sailor is reading a newspaper. In the middle is a patrol set up by the victors, the new masters of this palace — a man-soldier and a simple worker. A little break to smoke. I wanted to show these simple people together. After a smoke break... brutal, bloody battles began again".

When the artist decided to make a new painting about the October Uprising, he went to the Hermitage Museum in Leningrad on a day off. The usually crowded halls were empty. Vladimir Serov had already passed many rooms when he found himself on the Jordan Stairs. He was overwhelmed by the thought of how much this staircase had seen in its existence. The deserted grand staircase was echoed only by the rumbling footsteps of museum workers, invisible to the artist. Serov began to mentally recreate the appearance of the palace in the days of the October events. In his mind, and even before that, "a lot of vague, unclear, not yet formed images" appeared. At the same time, he began to form the plot of the future painting and his creative solution. It was here that the artist made pencil sketches that fixed the emerging idea.

After his return, Serov made a sketch of the painting, which included the general compositional solution, especially the two figures in the foreground, which were later incorporated into the final version of the painting without any major changes. The pencil sketches made in the Hermitage by Vladimir Serov did not take into account the final solution. Later, he worked on fragments of the future canvas, which, in his opinion, could and should be changed, as well as on the original compositional solution. He made sketches of important, from his point of view, defining elements of the picture: eyes, hands, head... Andrey Lebedev wrote that the creative work on the creation of a painting goes in two directions at the same time: from the general to the particular and from the particular to the general. Andrey Lebedev wrote that as Serov continued to work on the canvas, he filled the space with more and more figures. In various fragments of the painting, he tried to paint a sailor bandaging a wounded hand. He tried to paint a group of prisoners and junkers coming down the stairs. Vladimir Serov was disappointed with the results of such attempts. The more figures were added, the more the originally unified composition was fragmented. Most importantly, the main idea of the work was lost among the large number of independent fragments. The original atmosphere of the work also disappeared — "the impression of silence, the humming of the room, which so well emphasized the state of rest between battles".

Vladimir Serov decided to return to the original compositional solution: he had to abandon the already developed image of the Junkers and the wounded sailor. However, the artist remained dissatisfied with the composition. He tried again to fill the canvas with several figures, but was again disappointed with the result of his search. In the final version of the painting, only the sailor remained in the depths of the painting. In general, the final version was close to the original sketch.

== The painting as a part of the Tretyakov Gallery collection ==
The painting Winter is taken! was bought by the State Tretyakov Gallery and now it forms part of its collection. It is made in oil on canvas. Its size is small, despite the apparent scale of the composition — only 85 x 70 cm. The painting is signed and dated by the artist at the bottom right of the front: "V. Serov 54. Serov 54". Andrey Lebedev also mentions the existence of the 1965 study Jordan Staircase of the Winter Palace (canvas, oil paint, 81 x 75.5 cm). It is known that this sketch was shown at Vladimir Serov's personal exhibition in Moscow in 1964. Four other sketches for the painting Winter Palace Taken! refer to both the final and unrealized versions of the canvas:

The following sketches for the canvas are also mentioned in art history bibliography:

- Sketch of the composition of the painting (1954, 26 x 17.5 cm);
- Life drawing of two figures (1954, 32 x 22 cm);
- Sketch of one figure (1954, 33 x 22.5 cm);
- Sketch of a sailor (1954, 31 x 22,5 cm);
- Sketch of a figure (1954, 32.5 x 22 cm).

A number of sketches for this painting were shown at the artist's personal exhibition in Moscow in 1964 (the catalog does not give the specific names and sizes of the drawings presented in the exhibition). In his 1984 book on Serov's work, Andrey Lebedev wrote about the hundreds of drawings and sketches in the artist's sketchbooks and the many sketches he made on the way to the realization of his final idea. Some of them are in the Vladimir Serov Memorial and Art Museum, which is a branch of the Tver Regional Picture Gallery. The Soviet art historian repeatedly wrote about Serov's three methods of working on the material for the canvas: he "inscribed people and objects directly from life into the painting", worked from memory or preliminary sketches, and created fragments of the canvas based on his imagination.

During the Soviet period, the painting was exhibited in the permanent collection of the museum in Hall 44. It was repeatedly presented at important national and international exhibitions. Among them: All-Union Art Exhibition in 1954, the 3rd Exhibition of Works by Full and Corresponding Members of the Academy of Arts of the USSR, as well as the XXIX Venice Biennale in 1958[9], at the personal exhibition of Vladimir Serov in Moscow in 1964, at the exhibition of works by members of the Academy of Arts of the USSR on the occasion of the 25th anniversary of the transformation of the All-Russian Academy of Arts into the Academy of Arts of the USSR in 1973, and at a solo exhibition of works by the then deceased artist in Moscow in 1981.

The painting brought Vladimir Serov great public success (for example, it was reproduced on the cover of the popular magazine Ogonyok in January 1955), recognition from his peers (art historians and artists Tatiana Boitsova and Margarita Zheleznova called the canvas "an outstanding work on a historical-revolutionary theme"), Soviet art critics (Svetlana Chervonnaya, a doctor of art history, wrote of the canvas: "Extremely concise, it contains great content, great feeling in a small and carefully painted Winter Palace Taken!") and high state awards. In 1954, he was elected a full member of the Academy of Arts of the USSR. On June 28, 1956, Vladimir Serov was awarded the title of People's Artist of the RSFSR by the decree of the Presidium of the Supreme Soviet of the RSFSR. At the same time, the writer Ivan Shevtsov wrote in a letter to Sergey Sergeyev-Tsensky about the underestimation of the canvas in the conditions of the dramatically changed political situation in the country: "Lenin prizes could have been awarded to the artist Vladimir Serov for the painting Winter Palace Taken! Such a good painting. But the author is "anti-cosmopolitan", the Ehrenburgs hate him".

== Interpretations ==
=== During the Khrushchev Thaw ===
Writer Boris Lavrenyov saw a painting by Vladimir Serov at the All-Union Art Exhibition. In his article published in October in 1955, he pointed out that of the many paintings presented at the exhibition, only two were dedicated to the October Armed Uprising: Winter Palace Taken! by Vladimir Serov and In the Winter Palace by Anatoly Kazantsev. He found it curious that both depicted the same action — the participants of the uprising were depicted after the storming of the Winter Palace, and the same place — the action takes place on the Jordan Stairs. Lavrenyov noted the one and a half square meters of Kazantsev's painting, the "ostentatious" technical skill of its author, but pointed out the artist's shallow and superficial solution of the theme. In addition, Lavrenyov drew attention to a detail that, in his opinion, perverts the very meaning of the event depicted in Kazantsev's painting — the figure of a revolutionary Baltic sailor with a bandaged head is depicted on the stairs on the right side of the painting. He is depicted from behind in a boastful pose (his coat is pulled down from his left shoulder and his canteen is torn at the elbow, which is turned towards the viewer). Lavrenyov believed that they had nothing in common with the disciplined and conscientious fighters of the Baltic Fleet shock troops who stormed the Winter Palace.

Lavrenyov wrote that the small size of Vladimir Serov's painting proves that it is not necessary to create an enormous canvas to reflect the significance of an historical event. The writer noted that Serov "managed to convey the atmosphere of the October heroism of workers and peasants more vividly and powerfully". According to Lavrenyov, Serov's canvas, in contrast to Kazantsev's work, demonstrates "economy" of pictorial means, "rigor" in the interpretation of the event, and "accuracy" in the depiction of historical details. The artist found "a simple, but very expressive, generalizing type for two characters in the picture — a front-line soldier and an armed worker", managed to create the necessary background for them — "the lobby's dimension, marble and gold painted in cold tones, lying on the steps of the shell casings. This background creates an atmosphere of old-world catastrophe. The writer concluded that Vladimir Serov's painting "should certainly be placed in the first place" in relation to Kazantsev's work. Lavrenyov's analysis of Serov's and Kazantsev's paintings was reproduced in abridged form, without mentioning the author's name, by Vadim Vanslov, a doctor of art history and full member of the Academy of Arts of the USSR, in his monograph Content and Form in Art.

Cultural critic and Doctor of Sciences Ivan Astakhov noted in Vladimir Serov's painting Winter Palace Taken! the triumph of victory and "the calm confidence of the heroes of the storming of the Winter Palace, who are a little tired, but ready for a new battle". In his opinion, the picture perfectly conveys "the typical features of the heroes of the new era". In her paintings Astakhov emphasized "the absence of pose, pathos, exaltation", "simplicity, humanity, naturalness of feeling, which penetrate the appearance of heroes who have accomplished a feat". His analysis of Vladimir Serov's painting in the book Art and the Problem of the Beautiful ended with the demand to the Soviet artists of the 1960s to bring out just such personal features and qualities in the participants of the construction of the communist society.

The Soviet art historian Marina Orlova wrote that the canvas is characterized by integrity, "the general restrained tonality" and every detail serves to reveal the artist's intention inherent in the plot. She perceived the two heroes of the painting in the foreground as guardians of the new power. She noted the calm confidence of all three figures on the canvas. They are perceived by the viewer not as destroyers, but as new collective masters. Each of the depicted figures is a representative of a certain "working class", "one of many". According to Orlova, Serov showed "the birth of a new economy on a national scale". She considered the key figure of the canvas to be the "peasant" soldier. He overcame the "possessive instincts" inherent in the Russian peasantry and thus kept the treasures of the royal palace intact.

=== In Soviet art history and cultural studies ===
The Soviet art historian Lilia Bolshakova noted that the solution to a theme of "great historical significance" was "simple, modest and vitally true". Andrey Lebedev emphasized that the figures of the heroes are in the foreground. He noted the "tautness, deliberate composition" and stateliness of the worker's figure, which demonstrate his strength and courage. His face expresses "intelligence, confidence, dignity, will". His counterpart is an older soldier in marching uniform: a duffel bag over his shoulders, a rifle, an aluminum flask at his side. This is a soldier who lived through the First World War. His face is wrinkled, he has a thick beard, his eyes are "narrowed with cunning" and his hands are rough and "heavy". The artist presented the viewer with a peasant dressed in a soldier's coat, according to Lebedev: simple, wise, knowing life. Andrey Lebedev considered the artist's success in uniting the two main figures of the picture to be the gesture — the Red Guard gives the soldier a light. It shows, in his words, "the situation of battle friendship and mutual cordiality of these people, and as if growing into an expression of a strong union, brotherhood of the two main working classes of revolutionary Russia".

Lebedev noted the artist's contrast between the serenity of the palace's new owners and the turbulent events that had recently taken place there. The calmness of the figures and the ordinariness of their behavior, the Soviet art historian said, should have expressed confidence "in the firmness of the new government and the new revolutionary order. Another contrast Lebedev noticed was between the luxury of the palace interiors and the ordinariness of the revolutionary patrol's costumes. He wanted to demonstrate "the simplicity and moral purity of the people of the revolution, their connection with millions of hitherto destitute toilers". The painting is set in a single, calm color scheme.

In his earliest and most recent works on the work of Vladimir Serov, Andrey Lebedev argued that the two figures in the foreground represent Russia's "two revolutionary classes" and the "main driving force" of the revolutionary movement. The lighting of a cigar, however, convincingly shows "the brotherhood of the two main working classes". In the 1981 catalog, the significance of this gesture in Andrey Lebedev's assessment took on several aspects at once. In addition to the fraternity of the two classes, "confidence in victory" and "faith in a happy and just future" are noted. On the contrary, another Soviet art historian, Joseph Brodsky, emphasized that the artist was depicting "a brief pause before new battles".

External image
- | Alexander Osmirkin. Storming the Winter Palace, 1927, Russian Museum.

Doctor of art history Sofia Korovovich pointed out that Vladimir Serov's interpretation of the events of the October Armed Uprising (i.e. the subject of the painting) was not new or unique. For the first time the subject of the rest of the revolutionary soldiers and sailors after the storming of the Winter Palace was raised in 1927 by the Russian and Soviet artist Alexander Osmerkin in his painting The Seizure of the Winter Palace (another name — The Red Guards in the Winter Palace). He also depicted the top of the Jordan Stairs, where a revolutionary sailor, an armed worker, a soldier squatting on the steps, and many other participants of the already victorious uprising were sitting.

Korovovich noted the novelty of the composition of Serov's painting Winter Palace Taken!: the small number of depicted figures creates a silent atmosphere, that replaces the roar of the battle. The calmness of the figures, the unhurried and modest nature of the action that unites them are unexpected in the depiction of a great historical event. The art historian focused on the artist's choice of characters and types of his characters: the worker — a strong-willed and collected man, "a true organizer of the masses. The soldier — a strong, tough man, accustomed not only to the hardships of military service, but also to hard peasant labor. Korovkovich saw in him a representative of the poorest peasantry, interpreted in Soviet historiography as the main ally of the proletariat in the struggle for the victory of the socialist revolution. She noted the importance of the historical details meticulously reproduced by the artist: the machine-gun belt, the flask, the leather jacket, the boots made of rough leather. Sofia Korovkovich believed that the theme raised in the painting Winter Palace Taken! "was later continued, albeit in a completely different treatment (large, multi-figured canvases), in a special cycle of paintings by Vladimir Serov that included four canvases: Waiting for the Signal (1957, canvas, oil, 185 x 151 cm, Tretyakov Gallery, a group of Red Guards depicted on the parapet of the Neva in front of the Winter Palace on the eve of the attack on the Provisional Government's residence), Decree on Peace (1957, canvas, oil, 108 x 98 cm, Tretyakov Gallery), Decree on Land (1957, canvas, oil, 108 x 98 cm, Tretyakov Gallery) and V. I. Lenin at Smolny (1957, canvas, oil, 108 x 98 cm, Tretyakov Gallery). Lenin in Smolny (1957, canvas, oil, 184,5 x 151 cm, Tyumen Regional Museum of Fine Arts).

The candidate of art history Vladislav Zimenko in his book Soviet Historical Painting, analyzing the painting of Vladimir Serov, wondered whether the boundary between history painting and domestic genre is not erased here. He answered this question in the negative. In his opinion, the painting combines genres. At the same time, it "conveys the time well" and "recreates characteristic images typical of the contemporaries of the revolution". Historical painting is aimed at the "exceptional, unique", but its framework is broad enough to convey a specific fact and "typical, peculiar to the time". In the painting Winter Palace Taken! Zimenko noticed a special "emotionality of intonation". The domestic episode of the rest of the two heroes of the storming of the Winter Palace, in his opinion, expresses the unshakable confidence of the common people of Russia in the historical fact of the victory of the workers in the confrontation with the enemies of the soviets.

== Educational uses of painting ==
The picture was widely used in teaching at secondary schools in the USSR. For example, it was included in the diafilm So in October the dream of the workers and peasants came true, published in 1981 by the studio Diafilm Goskino USSR. It was intended for demonstration at the lessons of reading and speech development in the 2nd grade of general educational institutions. In 1981 the People's Artist of the RSFSR Anatoly Paramonov and the Doctor of Art History Svetlana Chervonnaya published the manual Soviet Painting: A book for teachers. In this book, the painting Winter Palace Taken! was characterized as capturing "a slice of life from the unforgettable year of 1917," and the book argued that in an insignificant episode depicted on the canvas, "the enormous power of historical generalization is concentrated". A major supplementary educational project was the third edition of the twelve-volume Children's Encyclopedia, published in 1977. In the last volume, dedicated to world art, Vladimir Serov's canvas was characterized as a painting that "deeply reveals the era, gives a heartfelt characterization of the ordinary participants of the revolution". The painting was widely used in extracurricular educational work. In an article published in the journal Pupils' Education in 1968, I. Pel described a musical-theatrical performance created by teachers and students, which combined an excerpt from Vladimir Mayakovsky's poem Vladimir Ilyich Lenin read by a student on stage, the sounds of machine-gun fire, volleys of gunfire, spotlights illuminating the room, and a fragment of Vladimir Serov's painting Winter Palace Taken! shown simultaneously on two screens. In order to increase the effect of participation, according to the idea of the creators of the performance, school pupils dressed in the costumes of the Red Guards and soldiers from Serov's painting run through the hall to the stage with a banner and rifles in their hands. One of them (Pel emphasized that even superficially he resembles the character depicted by the artist) freezes on the stage against the white background of the screen.

In modern Russian textbooks for secondary and higher education institutions, the picture often illustrates the events of the October Armed Uprising. An example is the textbook "History", published in 2013 under the editorship of the Head of the Department of History and Philosophy of the Moscow State Construction University Tatyana Molokova, recommended by the Educational and Methodological Association of Higher Education Institutions of the Russian Federation on Education in the Field of Construction for students studying in the bachelor's degree program in the direction of "Construction". The picture of Vladimir Serov is on the cover of this manual.

== Critics ==
Candidate of Historical Sciences Larisa Kashuk, analyzing the work of Soviet and contemporary Russian nonconformist artist Anatoly Brusilovsky, wrote that in the 1970s he used a cut-out fragment of a reproduction of the painting Winter Palace Taken! in several of his collages from the whole cycle, which, according to the art historian, used "stereotypical subjects" of world art (most often used were paintings by Vladimir Serov, but along with them Brusilovsky also used paintings by Russian pre-revolutionary artists Vasily S. Brusilovsky). In the center of such a work there was usually a large episode of the painting Winter Palace Taken! Around it, according to the principles of Russian medieval iconographic stamps, episodes from the same painting by Serov were placed, interspersed with figures from pre-revolutionary fashion magazines. The combination of elements of different styles and subjects created a new ironic space for such a work of art. Larisa Kashuk characterized these works by Brusilovsky as examples of kitsch and postmodernist quotation, but admitted that Brusilovsky's set of subjects, despite the differences in their interpretation, was still "quite monotonous".

Gerb Freikopf, a student of art history, in his monograph Eleven or the Constellation of Tau Kita called Vladimir Serov a maestro of socialist realism. Analyzing his painting Winter Palace Taken!, he noted the complete lack of emotion in the figures. Ironically, he wrote that they were united only by "a goat's leg and a great idea".

In the works of foreign art historians, Vladimir Serov's paintings serve to illustrate the peculiarities of socialist realism in Soviet art. For example, he used the painting Winter Palace Taken! in art historian Gleb Prokhorov's essay on Soviet fine art of 1930-1950, published by Craftsman House in 1995. Brandon Taylor provided a reproduction of this painting and mentioned it in the text of Modernism, Postmodernism, Realism: A Critical Perspective on the Development of Art. Toby Clark, in his 1997 book Perspectives on Art and Propaganda in the 20th Century, gave an illustration of Serov's work and briefly recounted the subject of the painting.

== Bibliography ==
=== Sourcer ===
- Serov, V. A. (1955). "Зимний взят!" [Winter Palace Taken!] (in Russian). Огонёк: Журнал.
- Lavrenyov, B. A. (1995). Всесоюзная художественная выставка // Собрание сочинений в 8 томах [All-Union Art Exhibition // Collected Works in 8 Volumes] (in Russian). Vol. 8. Автобиографии, очерки, статьи, выступления, письма. М.: Шихино. pp. 281–294. ISBN 5-86334-010-X.

=== Researches and non-fiction ===
- Astakhov, I. B. (1963). Эстетическое наслаждение и любовь к прекрасному // Искусство и проблема прекрасного [Aesthetic pleasure and love of the beautiful // Art and the problem of beautiful] (in Russian). М.: Советский писатель. pp. 142–171.
- Boitsova T. I., Zheleznova M. M. (1986). Владимир Серов // Край вдохновения [Vladimir Serov // The Edge of Inspiration] (in Russian). М.: Московский рабочий. pp. 88–90.
- Vanslov, V. V. (1956). Содержание и форма в искусстве [Content and form in art] (in Russian). М.: Искусство. p. 372.
- Brodsky, I. A. (1960). "Введение". Великий Октябрь в произведениях советских художников. Картины В. А. Серова [The Great October in the works of Soviet artists. Paintings by V. A. Serov] (in Russian). Л.: Художник РСФСР.
- Владимир Александрович Серов. Каталог выставки [Vladimir Serov. Exhibition catalog] (in Russian). М.: Искусство. 1964.
- Владимир Ильич Ленин. Живопись, скульптура, графика из собрания Центрального музея В. И. Ленина [Vladimir Lenin. Painting, sculpture, graphics from the collection of the Central Museum of Lenin] (in Russian). М.: Изобразительное искусство. 1986. p. 192.
- Zimenko, V. M. (1970). Советская историческая живопись [Soviet history painting] (in Russian). М.: Советский художник. p. 151.
- История: учебник для студентов ВПО, обучающихся по программе бакалавриата по направлению 270800 «Строительство» [History: textbook for HPE students studying on the Bachelor's degree program in the direction 270800 “Construction”] (in Russian). М.: МГСУ. 2013. p. 278. ISBN 978-5-7264-0783-8.
- Каталог // Выставка произведений членов Академии художеств СССР. К 25-летию преобразования Всероссийской Академии художеств в Академию художеств СССР. Живопись. Скульптура. Графика. Каталог [Catalog // Exhibition of works by members of the USSR Academy of Arts. To the 25th anniversary of the transformation of the All-Russian Academy of Arts into the Academy of Arts of the USSR. Painting. Sculpture. Graphics. Catalog.] (in Russian). М.: Искусство. 1973. pp. 299–301.
- Kashuk, L. A. (2001). "Китч и искусство постмодернизма в России". Наивное искусство и китч. Основные проблемы и особенности восприятия [Naive art and kitsch. Main problems and peculiarities of perception] (in Russian). СПб.: Алетейя: Сборник статей. pp. 220–230.
- Korovkevich, S. V. (1967). Владимир Александрович Серов [Vladimir Aleksandrovich Serov] (in Russian). Л.: Художник РСФСР.
- Lebedev, A. K. (1981). "Вступительная статья". Владимир Александрович Серов. Каталог выставки произведений. Живопись. Графика. Составитель Г. Г. Серова [Vladimir Serov. Exhibition catalog of works. Painting. Graphics. Compiled by G. G. Serov] (in Russian). М.: Изобразительное искусство. pp. 7–17.
- Lebedev, A. K. (1964). "Вступление". Владимир Александрович Серов. Каталог выставки [Vladimir Serov. Exhibition catalog] (in Russian). М.: Искусство. pp. 5–24.
- Lebedev, A. K. (1984). Владимир Серов [Vladimir Serov] (in Russian). М.: Искусство. p. 151.
- Lebedev, A. K. (1965). Владимир Серов [Vladimir Serov] (in Russian). М.: Искусство. p. 326.
- Lebedev, A. K. (1977). "Вл. А. Серов". Детская энциклопедия. Для среднего и старшего возраст. В 12 томах [Children's Encyclopedia. For middle and older ages. In 12 volumes] (in Russian). Vol. 12. Искусство (3rd ed.). Л.: Педагогика. pp. 306–307.
- Lebedev, A. K. (1983). "Главная тема — В. И. Ленин, Октябрь (О творчестве Владимира Александровича Серова)". Художник и судьба народа. Сборник статей [The artist and the fate of the people. Collection of articles] (in Russian). М.: Изобразительное искусство. pp. 129–159.
- Ogryzko, V. V. (2015). Охранители и либералы. В затянувшемся поиске компромисса. Историко-литературное исследование [Guardians and liberals. In the protracted search for compromise. A historical and literary study.] (in Russian). Vol. 2. М.: Литературная Россия. p. 445. ISBN 978-5-7809-0207-2.
- Orlova, M. A. (1964). Историко-революционная тема в советском изобразительном искусстве [Historical-revolutionary theme in Soviet fine arts]. Библиотечка по изобразительному искусству для народных университетов культуры, художественной самодеятельности и школьных библиотек (in Russian). М.: Искусство. p. 45.
- Paramonov A. V., Chervonnaya S. M. (1981). Советская живопись: Книга для учителя [Soviet painting: A book for teacher] (in Russian). М.: Просвещение. p. 272.
- Pel, I. (1968). Необычный школьный вечер [An unusual school night] (in Russian). Воспитание школьников: Журнал. pp. 78–81.
- Tikhomirova, A. (1981). Так в октябре мечта сбылась рабочих и крестьян [So in October, the dream of the workers and peasants came true] (in Russian). М.: Студия «Диафильм» Госкино СССР. p. 37.
- Fraikopf, G. (1996). Одиннадцать или Созвездие Тау кита [Eleven or the Tau Whale Constellation]. Виртуальные сокровища (in Russian). М.: Икар. p. 126. ISBN 5-85902-098-8.
- Chervonnaya, S. M. (1968). Картина и время: Русская советская тематическая картина 1917—1967 [Painting and Time: Russian Soviet Thematic Painting 1917-1967] (in Russian). Л.: Художник РСФСР. p. 90.
- Clark, T. (1997). Perspectives Art and Propaganda in the Twentieth-Century. Harry N. Abrams. p. 175. ISBN 978-0810-9271-31.
- Prokhorov, G. (1995). Art Under Socialist Realism: Soviet Painting 1930—1950. Craftsman House. p. 127. ISBN 978-9768-0978-35.
- Taylor, B. (1987). Modernism, Post-modernism, Realism: A Critical Perspective for Art. Winchester studies in art and criticism. Winchester School of Art Press. p. 172. ISBN 978-0950-6783-68.

=== Guides ===
- Antonova, V. I. (1968). Государственная Третьяковская галерея [State Tretyakov Gallery]. Города и музеи мира (in Russian). М.: Искусство. p. 184.
- Bolshakova, L. A. (1976). "Зал № 44". Государственная Третьяковская галерея. Краткий путеводитель [State Tretyakov Gallery. Brief Guide] (in Russian). М.: Изобразительное искусство. pp. 134–139.
