= Morning (Yablonska) =

Painting by Ukrainian artist Tetiana Yablonska

- Ранок (Ukrainian)
- Artist: Tetiana Yablonska
- Year: 1954
- Medium: Oil on canvas
- Dimensions: 169 cm × 110 cm (67 in × 43 in)
- Location: Tretyakov Gallery, Moscow

Morning (Ukrainian: «Ранок», romanized: Ranok) is a painting by Ukrainian Soviet artist Tetiana Yablonska, created in 1954 in Kyiv. The painting depicts a girl doing morning exercises (the artist depicted her eldest daughter in the interior of her Kyiv flat). Art critics have noted the joyful atmosphere of the morning, skillfully conveyed by the painter, with the sunlight pouring through the window. Soviet art historian Irina Abeldyaeva noted in the depicted girl the spontaneity of a child, and a quality of human warmth, soulfulness, clarity and freshness of perception of the world in the painting itself.

The painting is considered a striking phenomenon of the early period of the Khrushchev Thaw. British art historian and specialist in art and visual culture of the USSR, Mike O'Mahony, posits that the painting symbolised in the minds of the people of his era the transition "from sleep to wakefulness, from darkness to light, from chaos (the unmade bed [in the girl's room]) to a new order, balance, harmony." This symbolism reflects the hopes that the end of the Stalinist era awakened in people. From his point of view, the painting powerfully emphasises the heroine's national identity within the context of her era.

The painting was swiftly acclaimed by art critics, attained considerable popularity among the general public, and reproductions were published in major Soviet periodicals. The painting is part of the collection of the State Tretyakov Gallery and is on display in the building of the New Tretyakov Gallery on Krymsky Val.

The painting is reproduced in textbooks for secondary school and is recommended for study in classes by methodologists in Ukraine and Russia.

== Subject and the artist's interpretation ==
Ukrainian Soviet art historian Leonid Vladich described the painting as follows:

The ringing joy of life sounds in the painting "Morning". Both the slender, characterised by the elongated proportions of the figure of a teenage girl engaged in morning exercises, and the bright sun streaming into the room through the wide-open balcony door, and the tender green leaves of a creeper - all this speaks of healthy, bright, joyful youth.

— Leonid Vladich., T. N. Yablonska

The painting depicts a room in which a girl is exercising next to her still unmade bed. Both doors leading to the balcony are wide open. A long-legged girl in short shorts is doing her morning exercise. The artist's daughter, Elena, who was depicted in the painting, stated that she was portrayed by her mother while preparing for the gymnastic position known as the "swallow." (however, in another interview she said: "And this pose in which I am in the picture, it is not so much gymnastic as ballet. When you're going to do a swallow. A kind of backward swing of the leg"). A modest breakfast is already prepared for her on the table, her school uniform is neatly folded on the chair, and an ironed pioneer tie is placed over it. The jug on the table is Czech. Tetiana Yablonska brought it from her first business trip abroad. The striped tablecloth on which the jug stands has served the family for many years.

The leaves above the window in the painting reflect the second passion of the artist's daughter. She was very fond of plants, and there were always flowering seedlings on the balcony. Thirteen-year-old Lena was preparing to study botany and even become a forester's wife. But after the 7th grade, Tetiana Yablonska insisted that the girl go to an art school.

Elena Beisembinova talks about her state of mind while posing for her mother:

"I had just been accepted into the pioneers, I was just flying. I would jump up in the morning with the first rays of the sun and squint, feeling how the spring sun warmed the floor. And my mum caught this feeling of a child warm from sleep... I did ballet and gymnastics, and the way the painting shows me with my feet off to the side and arms outstretched is part of choreography, these movements my mum noticed... The painting is very naturalistic"

— Alexandra Mayantseva, "Morning." Continued. Interview with E. S. Beisembinova

The artistic image of the canvas is based on three planes, according to Lidia Popova and Vladimir Zeltner:

- The morning outside the window, "where the bluish drowsy haze still swirls in the unawakened streets and melts away into the whitish sky."
- Morning in "blue long shadows entered through the open balcony door and stretched across the floor, hiding in the folds of the bed."
- In her heroine, the artist seeks an image of the morning of human life: the slim, slender figure seems to be rushing towards her city and the new day.

== History of creation and the painting's fate ==
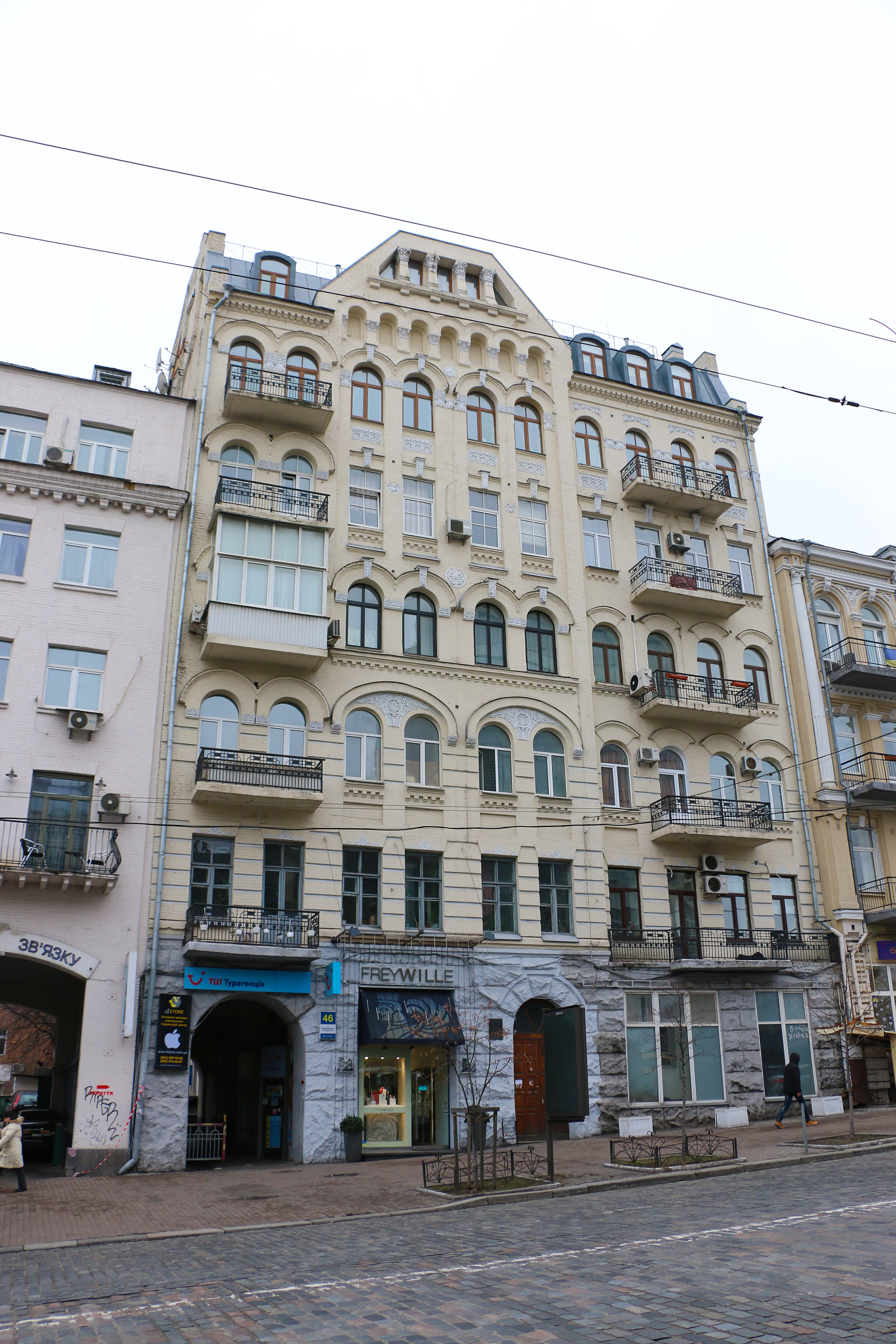
Kyiv, house No. 46 on Bolshaya Vasylkivska Street, where the action of the painting takes place

By 1954, Tetiana Yablonska had become a well-known figure among artists and the general public. Her painting Bread, created in 1949, was included in the main exhibition in the State Tretyakov Gallery. Reproductions of her work on postcards and posters were sold by the millions. The young artist was awarded the Stalin Prize of the 2nd degree.

The painting depicts a thirteen-year-old girl named Lena, who is the eldest daughter of Tetiana Yablonska from her first marriage to the artist Sergei Otroschenko. The action is set in apartment No. 9, situated in the centre of Kyiv, in house No. 46 on Krasnoarmeyskaya Street, where Elena Otroschenko resided between 1949 and 1955. The room, which appears spacious on the canvas, is one of two rooms within a Kyiv communal apartment where the artist and her daughter lived. Yelena later told a Komsomolskaya Pravda correspondent: "We lived poorly, even girlfriends were embarrassed to visit. Although my mother's paintings were printed in textbooks along with masterpieces by Shishkin and Repin, it brought neither money nor any national fame. And certainly no mountains of letters never came to me. My classmates did not even suspect that I was the daughter of the very same Yablonskaya, because I carried my father's surname - Otroshchenko - and did not boast to anyone about my kinship."

External image
- Elena (Otroschenko) and Arsen Beisembinov after the wedding.

External videos
- The amazing story of "Morning" by Tetiana Yablonska (in Ukrainian).

The painting "Morning" played a significant role in the personal life of its protagonist. Elena, the artist's daughter, met Arsen Beisembinov, a young artist from Kazakhstan, while studying at the Stroganov Moscow State Academy of Arts and Industry at the faculty of decorative fabric design. As a boy, he fell in love with the girl in the reproduction of the painting "Morning" that hung in his house. Elena and Arsen married. At present Tetiana Yablonska's eldest daughter Elena Beisembinova lives in Kazakhstan (her husband died in 2000), she is a member of the Union of Artists and the Union of Cinematographers of the Republic of Kazakhstan. In Almaty in 1962, she gave birth to a son, Zangar, who also pursued a career in the arts. The couple initially worked in the film industry, but Elena herself acknowledged that she was not particularly drawn to the field. She breeds pheasants and grows peonies. Most of her paintings are of flowers. She offers her own beaded bracelets to visitors to her exhibitions. Elena informed me that the couple never had the opportunity to view the painting Morning, which became a talisman for them, in the hall of the Tretyakov Gallery. When they were young, they did not give it much thought, and in adulthood their schedules did not match up.

The painting technique employed was oil painting on canvas. The dimensions of the artwork are 169 × 110 cm. During the process of creating the canvas, the artist created a substantial number of sketches. The painting was exhibited at the 3rd All-Russian exhibition of works by full members and corresponding members of the Academy of Arts of the USSR in 1954, and was well received by both the audience and the critics. The painting was subsequently acquired by the State Tretyakov Gallery, where it is currently included in the collection. The artist's canvas is exhibited in the section of Soviet painting during the Khrushchev Thaw in the building of the New Tretyakov Gallery on Krymsky Val (Inventory No. ZhS58).

The artist herself was not satisfied with the result of her work. In a letter to the art historian Anna Galushkina, who was the head of the Department of Soviet Paintings and Graphics at the Tretyakov Gallery, dated August 1963, while discussing the possible acquisition of another painting by Yablonskaya (Wedding) for the Tretyakov Gallery, she wrote: "I would, of course, very much like to once again get on the sacred walls of the gallery." "I would, of course, very much like to go to the sacred walls of the gallery again. And it seems to me that this painting, at any rate, would be better received than my work 'Morning'". Towards the end of her life she was even more definite: "At that time a lot of all sorts of coddling children's pictures were painted. And everything seemed good, 'artistic'. Nasty, anti-art picture 'Morning'. But it wasn't bad in concept. It was inspired by E. Volobuev. But in terms of painting it is an absolute zero."

Gayane Atayan, the artist's daughter, posited that the negative review of the painting was the product of the author's emotional state and does not accurately reflect Tetiana Yablonska's genuine assessment of the painting Morning: "It was written in the 90s. Mum was a person of mood. That's how it seemed to her in the moment. And about the painting "Bread" she once said, say, it's a poster, and already at the end of life, analysing her work, she said: "All the same, my best painting is 'Bread'. I have always been proud of it...". And Evgeny Vsevolodovich Volobuev was an unquestionable authority for my mother and for all of us. Always. He was a very fine painter, a man of keen mind, who could describe a phenomenon in one word in such a way that one could neither give nor take. If he spoke favourably about someone's work, we appreciated it very much. I've been lucky enough to spend a little time with him. I don't have many works that Uncle Zhenya approved."

The painting was exhibited on numerous occasions at events showcasing Soviet art. In 2017, it was included in the travelling exhibition 'Windows to Russia'. The art critic observed that the exhibition comprised canvases from the Soviet era, featuring a recurring motif of a window. It was opened in Nizhny Novgorod and subsequently displayed in five other cities, including Moscow. Expert magazine, talking about this event, characterised Yablonskaya's canvas in the following way: "The symbol of the exhibition, its brand, which should immediately inform the viewer what he will see, what mood he will be imbued with when he comes here - a textbook work."

The Ukrainian national TV channel 1+1 prepared a brief programme dedicated to the creation of the painting, entitled 'The Amazing Story of the painting "Morning" by Tetiana Yablonska'.

== Reviews and criticism ==
In the first monograph on the artist's oeuvre, Soviet art historian Valentina Kuriltseva highlighted the fact that Yablonskaya was simultaneously creating multiple works. These include Builders, Over the Dnieper (1953-1954), In the Summer (1954), Spring On the Window (1954), At Home with a Book (1954), Morning (1954), and Listening to a Fairy Tale (1954). All of these paintings are imbued with a "cheerful, upbeat mood." According to her, the public received these paintings emotionally, as a warm response to the artist's own experience. This peculiarity of the artist's work testifies to Yablonskaya's adherence to the traditions of the masters of the past.

In her book "Soviet Art in the Years of the Construction of Communism", published in 1964, the art historian Irina Abeldyaeva notes the poetic image created by the artist in the painting Morning, the light colouring that conveys the cheerful atmosphere of the morning, the sunlight streaming in through the window. The critic sees in the girl a childlike directness, and in the painting itself a warmth of humanity, soulfulness, clarity and freshness of perception of the surrounding world.

The Soviet art historians Lidia Popova and Vladimir Zeltner, in their book on Tetiana Yablonska's work published in 1968, note the painting's morning-enlightened palette, based on the relationship between the flat planes of the walls and floor in a warm ochre tone, the white spot of the bed in "bluish cool reflexes," the tablecloth in a wide blue stripe and the blue morning city that is visible through the balcony door. The painting is vertically elongated and subordinated to the rhythm of vertical lines, emphasised by the upward movement of the girl herself. The sense of space is enhanced by the view of the city through the open door of the balcony, the space of the city merging with the space of the painting, becoming part of it. The painting itself is filled with an "even, calm radiance."

By 1954, Tetiana Yablonska had already created several works on the theme of sport, such as Before the Start (1947) and On the Dnieper (1952). Both works depict sport as a mass movement, place the participant-viewer at the centre of attention, and are inspired by the work of Aleksandr Deyneka. Morning is Yablonskaya's first significant work painted after Stalin's death. In the opinion of Leonid Vladich, a candidate of art history, the painting marks the artist's departure from the orientation towards Alexander Deineka's work. The scene depicted in the painting was one with which all Soviet people were familiar. At that time, radio receivers played cheerful music, and the announcer conducted remote morning exercises, including bends and squats. The girl in Yablonskaya's painting is depicted during such exercises. She has just got up (the untidy bed can be seen on the left). The girl's clothes are lying on a chair by the open door from the room to the balcony; she herself, in a T-shirt and trousers, raises her arms and right leg.

Leonid Vladich, a student of art history, noted that the sun outside the window and the green leaves leaning towards the girl emphasise her youth. He thought that the peculiarity of Yablonska's lyrical talent lay in the inseparable intertwining of the personal and the social, the result of which is that "'My Children' always grows into the theme of 'our children'". In this, he saw the secret of Yablonska's influence on the viewer. He also noted: "These works by Yablonska, in our opinion, are interesting also because they are polemically directed against far-fetched, outwardly prosperous, but empty and cold paintings, which some artists try to pass off as actual works on the mere grounds that they have raised (but by no means explored in artistic images!) a contemporary theme." In Vladich's opinion, Yablonskaya's paintings of children are proof that "every phenomenon of our everyday life is full of great poetry".

In the collective monograph World Artistic Culture. 20th Century. Fine Art and Design, published in 2007, it was noted that Yablonskaya's painting "shows a serene morning, the easy and relaxed atmosphere of everyday life in a very ordinary Soviet home." A similar idea was expressed by Mike O'Mahony, PhD, a graduate of the Courtauld Institute of Art in London and an expert in the art and visual culture of the USSR between the First and Second World Wars. In his opinion, the artist presents the world of everyday, private life before the viewer. However, the light falling from the depths and the selected angle of view (the viewer is positioned somewhat above the subject) create the effect of a prepared public performance rather than a home exercise. O'Mahony highlights the distinction between the primitive exercises that were a staple of radio gymnastics and the more complex professional position assumed by the young athlete, which bears resemblance to the poses typically seen in a ballet class or a gymnasium. The British art historian's assumption is confirmed by the sister of the girl in the painting: "In her youth, Lelya did gymnastics, loved to dance, she was even told that she could be a ballerina." Elena herself confirmed this in her interviews: "I danced very well as a child. I was initially predicted a ballet [career], then a gymnastics career." The art historian links the painting's creation date (1954) to the exceptional achievements of Soviet athletes in gymnastics at the 1952 Helsinki Olympics (the USSR gymnasts won twenty-two medals, including nine gold medals). In the 1930s, gymnastics held a significant position within the military training system, was incorporated into the curriculum of physical education institutes, but it was only after the war that it became widely spread throughout the USSR. In children's sports schools, gymnastics became the most popular among girls.

O'Mahony posits that Yablonskaya's portrayal of the young gymnast does not exemplify mass participation in the physical culture movement. (Note: Publicly accessible (mass) sport is focused on achieving basic physical fitness, it is a social institution that creates conditions for health improvement, recreation, self-improvement and socialisation.) Instead, he views the image as a symbol of the professionalism of young athletes who glorify the Soviet people with their victories. Additionally, he highlights that the young heroine of the painting is, as per the artist's intention, Ukrainian. This is evident from the objects in the room (which display national characteristics), the bright sun, the warm southern air blowing from the balcony, and the girl's hairstyle. Apart from the fact that the artist herself was living in Ukraine at the time, it was from Ukraine that the future winners and medallists of the 1952 Summer Olympics, namely Viktor Chukarin, Dmytro Leonkin, Maria Gorokhovskaya and Nina Bocharova, came to Helsinki. In the climate of late Stalinism, highlighting Ukrainian national identity was seen as harmful and dangerous. Yablonska's emphasis on the young gymnast's national identity, says O'Mahony, suggests that changes in this area were to be expected in the near future. O'Mahony notes that "Ukrainian national identity here is linked, through references to physical culture and sport, to the broader aims and objectives of the modern multinational Soviet state." According to the art historian, Yablonska's Morning is a work that captures the atmosphere of the early period of the Thaw. The artist depicted the transition of Kyiv "from sleep to wakefulness, from darkness to light, from chaos (untidy bed) to a new order, balance and harmony. The young gymnast embodies the hopes and aspirations brought to life by the end of the Stalinist era."

Lubov Vachayeva, a staff member at Nizhnevartovsk State University, noted that the painting is "filled with love, happiness and joy." According to the author, Yablonska has always portrayed "children in a touching way." In her opinion, the artist's paintings dedicated to children are "characterised by picturesque freshness and a cheerful outlook."

The contemporary art critic Vyacheslav Surikov noted that the painting's depiction of a crumpled bed suggested that the girl had just jumped out of it, her arms outstretched like wings in flight. He saw in the heroine of the canvas "an exemplary Soviet girl who has 'only the sky, only the wind, only joy before her.'" Analysing the painting, he said: "[The girl] was born in the happiest country in the world, where people have nothing to be sad about and only have to wait for that bright future." At the same time, Surikov noted that a modern viewer, in his words, "poisoned by postmodernism," would still notice that the girl "is posing and, in order to assume such a position, she has clearly been practising." However, this "does not cancel out the optimism and state of happiness captured in this painting." Natalia Nekhlebova, an art critic for Ogoniok magazine, wrote of Morning: "Its humanity, warmth and freshness became symbols of the thaw. The flying movement of the girl's hands and the tenderness of the morning created in contemporaries a sense of hope and the beginning of a new time."

Contemporary Ukrainian art historian and PhD candidate Halyna Sklyarenko and postgraduate student Olena Ivanchenko of Borys Grinchenko Kyiv Metropolitan University observed the popularity of the painting Morning in the mid-1950s, "where in a bright, sun-drenched room a thin girl does her morning exercises," but immediately remarked that Tetiana Yablonska "herself felt and understood the creative vanity of these works [her paintings of the time]." In a recent publication, Mark Dupeti (the pseudonym of the candidate of art history Ostap Kovalchuk) has attributed the painting Morning to the period of the artist's work when she transitioned from creating "large canvases to chamber, intimate depictions of her children." These paintings, namely Got a Cold (1953) and Girl with a Net (1954), were widely recognised by the general public, yet the artist herself "did not experience full creative satisfaction" from them.

== Use of the painting in teaching and educational work with adolescents ==
A reproduction of Morning was printed shortly after its creation in the popular magazine Ogoniok, and it was subsequently repeatedly issued on postcards. The painting was placed into a Russian-language textbook, and Soviet schoolchildren were required to write an essay about the painting. In his book The Secrets of Nika Turbina's Life, historian Alexander Ratner notes that as a schoolgirl, the future poet wrote an essay on Yablonska's painting Morning. This essay has not survived, but the girl's literature teacher told Ratner that part of it was in verse and dedicated to the glare of the sun reflected from the floor in the room of the canvas's heroine. Subsequently, the painting was also used in education, in particular in Ukraine in the 2000s it was recommended for study in the 4th grade Russian language course.

Vera Kryuchkova, a teacher, recommended the use of the painting when working with students on a collective author's text. Associate Professor of the Department of Special Psychology of the Tolstoy Tula State Pedagogical University, candidate of pedagogical sciences Oksana Kokoreva and a student of this university Alyona Proshkina put forth the idea of employing the painting for a virtual museum space where work with preschoolers with visual impairment will be conducted. The painting is deemed to meet the following criteria: accessibility of the content, proximity of the depicted scene to children's personal experience, artistic value, realism of the image, proportionality of objects in accordance with real-world ratios, colour contrast, and clear delineation of the near, middle, and far plans. A short story about the painting and a reproduction of it were printed in the children's magazine Murzilka.

== Bibliography ==
Sources

- Lisnichenko, I. (2007-02-23). "Starshaya doch Narodnogo khudozhnika Ukrainy Tatyany Yablonskoy Yelena: "Mama uvlekalas yogoy i mogla golodat do 40 dney"" Старшая дочь Народного художника Украины Татьяны Яблонской Елена: «Мама увлекалась йогой и могла голодать до 40 дней» [Elena, the eldest daughter of the People's Artist of Ukraine Tetiana Yablonska: "Mum was interested in yoga and could fast up to 40 days".]. Fakty I Kommentarii (in Ukrainian). Archived from the original on 2017-10-14.
- "Tatyana Yablonskaya: o sebe" Татьяна Яблонская: о себе [Tetiana Yablonska: about herself]. Zerkalo Nedeli. Ukraina (in Russian). 2005-06-24. ISSN 1563-6437.
- Atayan, G. (March 2010). ""Shkoda, shcho mama ne dozhyla do shchaslyvoho chasu, koly pobachyla svit tsya knyha "Tetyana Yablon'ska""" «Шкода, що мама не дожила до щасливого часу, коли побачила світ ця книга „Тетяна Яблоньска“» ["It is a pity that my mother did not live to see the happy time when this book 'Tetiana Yablonska' was published."]. Zhurnal Verkhovnoyi Rady Ukrayiny «Viche» (in Ukrainian) (5): 65–67.

Scientific and popular science literature

- Abeldyaeva, I.G. (1964). Sovetskoye iskusstvo v gody razvyornutogo stroitelstva kommunizma Советское искусство в годы развёрнутого строительства коммунизма [Soviet art in the years of the unfolding construction of communism] (in Russian). Moscow: Iskusstvo.
- Valuyskaya, N. (2015-03-20). "Ty uvidish utro siyayushchim" Ты увидишь утро сияющим [You'll see the morning shining]. Kazakhstanskaya Pravda (in Russian). ISSN 0233-3414. Archived from the original on 2017-07-29.
- Vachayeva, L.A. (2015). "Obraz rebyonka i mir detstva v izobrazitelnom iskusstve Rossii sovetskogo perioda" Образ ребёнка и мир детства в изобразительном искусстве России советского периода [The image of the child and the world of childhood in the visual arts of Russia of the Soviet period]. Kultura. Dukhovnost. Obshchestvo (in Russian) (20): 19–23.
- Vladich, L.V. (1958). T. N. Yablon'ska Т. Н. Яблоньска [Т. N. Yablonska]. Biblioteka ukrainskogo iskusstva (in Ukrainian). Kyiv: Gosudarstvennoye izdatelstvo izobrazitelnogo iskusstva i muzykalnoy literatury.
- Goncharuk, O. (2017-02-24). "Tatyana Yablonskaya: geny sotsrealizma, perezhivshy sistemu" Татьяна Яблонская: гений соцреализма, переживший систему [Tetiana Yablonska: a genius of socialist realism who survived the system]. Komsomolskaya Pravda (in Russian). ISSN 0233-433X. Archived from the original on 2017-06-30.
- Dupeti, M. (2003). "Vozvrashcheniye k zhivopisi" Возвращение к живописи [Return to painting]. Tatyana Yablonskaya Татьяна Яблонская [Tetiana Yablonska]. Velikiye khudozhniki. Ikh zhizn, vdokhnoveniye i tvorchestvo (in Russian). Kyiv: Eaglemoss Ukrain. pp. 5–6.
- Kokoreva, O.I.; Proshkina, A.V. (December 2015). "Razvitiye sotsialnogo vzaimodeystviya detey s narusheniyem zreniya v virtualnom muzeynom prostranstve" Развитие социального взаимодействия детей с нарушением зрения в виртуальном музейном пространстве. Gumanitarnye Vedomosti TGPU Im. L. N. Tostogo (in Russian) (4): 79–80.
- Kryuchkova, V.V. (2015). "Avtorsky tekst kak rezultat kollektivnykh uchebnykh deystvy" Авторский текст как результат коллективных учебных действий [Author's text as a result of collective learning actions]. Eksperiment i innovatsii v shkole (in Russian) (3): 32–33. ISSN 2306-8337.
- Kuriltseva, V.V. (1959). Tatyana Nilovna Yablonskaya Татьяна Ниловна Яблонская [Tetiana Nilovna Yablonska] (in Russian). Moscow: Sovetsky Khudozhnik.
- Lvova, E.P.; Sarabianov, D.V.; Kabkova, E.P.; Fomina, N.N.; Khan-Magomedova, V.D. (2007). Mirovaya khudozhestvennaya kultura. XX vek. Izobrazitelnoye iskusstvo i dizayn Мировая художественная культура. XX век. Изобразительное искусство и дизайн [World Art Culture. 20th century. Fine Art and Design] (in Russian). Saint Petersburg: Piter Press.
- Martynova, Alyona (2018-02-07). "Istoriya odnoy kartiny: Sovetsky shkolnik povesil nad krovatyu portret devochki, a cherez neskolko let zhenilsya na ney" История одной картины: Советский школьник повесил над кроватью портрет девочки, а через несколько лет женился на ней. [The Story of One Painting: A Soviet schoolboy hung a portrait of a girl over his bed and a few years later married her.]. Komsomolskaya Pravda. Vladivostok (in Russian). ISSN 0233-433X. Archived from the original on 2018-09-11.
- Mayantseva, Alexandra (2018-02-15). ""Utro". Prodolzheniye. Intervyu s E. S. Beysembinovoy" «Утро». Продолжение. Интервью с Е. С. Бейсембиновой ["Morning." Continued. Interview with E. S. Beisembinova]. Moy Rayon (in Russian). Archived from the original on 2018-09-11.
- O'Mahony, Mike (2010). Sport v SSSR. Fizicheskaya kultura — vizualnaya kultura Спорт в СССР. Физическая культура — визуальная культура (in Russian). Moscow: Novoye literaturnoye obozreniye. ISBN 978-5-8679-3815-4.
- Nekhlebova, Natalia (2019-01-14). "Sudba. Devochka s kartinki" Судьба. Девочка с картинки [Destiny. The girl from the painting]. Ogonyok (in Russian). ISSN 0131-0097.
- Popova, L.I.; Zeltner, V.P. (1968). T. N. Yablonskaya Т. Н. Яблонская [T. N. Yablonska] (in Russian). Moscow: Sovetsky khudozhnik.
- Polyanskaya, Olga (2014). "God 1949. Goryacheye serdtse Tatyany Yablonskoy" Год 1949. Горячее сердце Татьяны Яблонской [The year 1949. Tetiana Yablonska's Hot Heart]. Tretyakov Gallery (in Russian). 4 (45). ISSN 1729-7621. Archived from the original on 2017-06-30.
- Ratner, A.V. (2018). Tayny zhizni Niki Turbinoy ("Ya ne khochu rasti…") Тайны жизни Ники Турбиной («Я не хочу расти…») [Secrets of Nika Turbina's life (‘I don't want to grow up...’)]. Biografiya epokhi (in Russian). Moscow: AST. ISBN 978-5-1798-2436-7.
- Surikov, Vyacheslav (2017-10-02). "Solnechnoye leto 1954-go" Солнечное лето 1954-го [Sunny summer of 1954]. Expert (in Russian) (40 (1046)). ISSN 1812-1896.
- Ivanchenko, O.O. (2020-12-04). "Osobystyy shlyakh Tetyany Yablons'koyi v istoriyi radyans'koho zhyvopysu" Особистий шлях Тетяни Яблонської в історії радянського живопису [The Personal Path of Tetiana Yablonska in the History of Soviet Painting]. Mizhdystsyplinarni Naukovi Doslidzhennya: Osoblyvosti Ta Tendentsiyi (in Ukrainian). 5: 112–116.
- Sklyarenko, G.Y. (2018). "Tvorchist' Tetyany Yablons'koyi (1917–2005): osobystyy shlyakh v istoriyi radyans'koho zhyvopysu" Творчість Тетяни Яблонської (1917–2005): особистий шлях в історії радянського живопису [The work of Tetiana Yablonska (1917-2005): a personal path in the history of Soviet painting] (PDF). Ukrayins'ki khudozhnyky: z vidlyhy do nezalezhnosti. U 2-kh knyhakh. Knyha persha Українські художники: з відлиги до незалежності. У 2-х книгах. Книга перша [Ukrainian Artists: From Thaw to Independence. In 2 books. Book one.]. Ukrayins'ke mystetstvo XX—XXI st (in Ukrainian). Kyiv: ArtHuss. pp. 19–47. ISBN 9-786-1775-1857-9.

Encyclopaedias and handbooks

- "561.41. Zhytlovyy budynok 1911—12, v yakomu prozhyvala Yablons'ka T. N." 561.41. Житловий будинок 1911—12, в якому проживала Яблонська Т. Н. [561.41. The apartment building of 1911-12, where T. N. Yablonska lived.]. Zvid pam"yatok istoriyi ta kul'tury. Kyyiv. Redkol. tomu: Vidp. red. P. Tron'ko ta in Звід пам'яток історії та культури. Київ. Редкол. тому: Відп. ред. П. Тронько та ін [A list of historical and cultural monuments. Kyiv. Editorial board of the volume: P. Tronko et al.] (PDF) (in Ukrainian). Vol. I. Part III. С—Я. Kyiv: Main Editorial Board of the Collection of Historical and Cultural Monuments at the Mykola Bazhan Ukrainian Encyclopaedia Publishing House. 2011. p. 1930. ISBN 978-966-95478-2-8.

Textbooks and methodological materials

- Zhuravko, O.I. (2007). Russky yazyk. 4 klass: Plany-konspekty urokov Русский язык. 4 класс: Планы-конспекты уроков [Russian language. Grade 4: Lesson Plans and Lesson Notes] (in Russian). Moscow: Ranok Publishing House Ltd. pp. 248–249. ISBN 9-789-6608-1873-6.

Children's editions

- Allenova, E.M. (2013). "Tatiana Nilovna Yablonskaya" Татьяна Ниловна Яблонская [Tetiana Nilovna Yablonska]. Murzilka (in Russian) (3).
