= Second Program of the CPSU =

Communist party establishing document

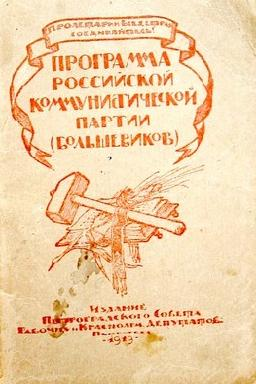
Programme of the Russian Communist Party (Bolsheviks) approved at the 8th Party Congress in 1919

The Second Program of the CPSU was the main document of the Communist Party of the Soviet Union, adopted during the 6th Congress of the Russian Social Democratic Labour Party (Bolsheviks) in 1917. The Program was later amended during the 8th Congress of the Russian Communist Party (b) in 1919, after the Bolsheviks had been swept to power during the October Revolution, to include numerous changes, including a description of Imperialism as the Highest Stage of Capitalism, Industrial Capitalism and elaborations on the economic structure of Russia, including descriptions of Small Commodity Production and the role of the Middle Peasantry.

The Program, as amended during the 8th Party Congress, contains a clause addressing the National Question which declares:

9. In the national question the Communist Party of the Soviet Union is guided by the following postulates:

(1) The cornerstone of our policy is the policy of drawing together the proletarians and the semi-proletarians of the various nationalities for the purpose of waging a joint revolutionary struggle for the overthrow of the landowners and the bourgeoisie.

(2) In order to overcome the distrust felt by the working masses of oppressed countries towards the proletariat of states which used to oppress those countries, it is necessary to abolish all the privileges enjoyed by any national group, to establish complete equality of rights for all nationalities, to recognise the right of colonies and dependent nations to separation.

(3) With the same aim in view the Party proposes, as a transitional form towards complete unity, a federation of states organised according to the Soviet type.

(4) As for the question as to who is to express the will of the nation to separate, the Communist Party of the Soviet Union adopts the historical class viewpoint, taking into consideration the stage of the historical development of the given nation: whether it is evolving from medievalist to bourgeois democracy, or from bourgeois democracy to Soviet or proletarian democracy, etc.

In any case, the proletariat of the nation which has been the oppressing nation must exercise special caution and pay special attention to the survivals of national sentiment among the toiling masses of oppressed nations or those not possessing full rights. Only by following such a policy will it be possible to create conditions for really durable, voluntary unity among the nationally heterogeneous elements of the international proletariat, as was shown by the experience of uniting a number of national Soviet republics around Soviet Russia.

Bukharin and Pyatakov argued against the inclusion of this clause, believing that such a declaration affirming the rights of nations to self determination could work against and hinder the cause of "drawing together of proletarians and semi-proletarians of various nationalities," however, in this they were overruled by Lenin and the clause was accepted into the program. The program also argued for a strong, proletarian Red Army, the transformation of the Education System in order that it should become "vehicle of communist principles in general... a vehicle of the ideological, organisational and educational influence of the proletariat over the proletarian and non-proletarian strata of the toiling masses, for the purpose of educating a generation capable of finally establishing communism," - that is the education system should become a beacon of socialist ideology - the establishment of a planned economy, the eradication of child labour, the introduction of a bonus system "in order to encourage the productivity of labour," and for the adoption of "far-reaching health and sanitary measures, for the purpose of preventing the spread of disease," among numerous other declarations.

The Program was replaced in 1961, during the 22nd Congress of the Communist Party of the Soviet Union by the Third Program, which set the party goal of achieving "Communism in 20 years".
