= Tetiana Yablonska =

Russian artist (1917–2005)

Hero of Ukraine Tetyana Yablonska
- Тетяна Яблонська
- Born: 24 February 1917; Smolensk, Russian Republic
- Died: 17 June 2005 (aged 88); Kyiv, Ukraine

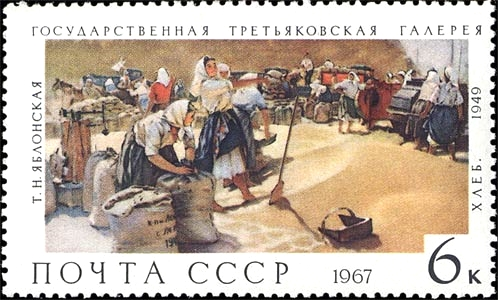
Corn (Sacking Grain), 1949, on a Soviet postage stamp of 1967.

Tetiana Nylivna Yablonska (Ukrainian: Тетяна Нилівна Яблонська, Russian: Татьяна Ниловна Яблонская; 24 February 1917 – 17 June 2005) was a Russian-Ukrainian artist.

== Biography ==
Yablonska was born in Smolensk. Since 1935 she studied at the Kyiv State Institute of Art under the modernist Ukrainian painter Fedir Krychevsky and launched upon her artistic career after graduating. Unfortunately, her work was interrupted by the Nazi invasion in 1941. She returned to Kyiv soon after its liberation. She was employed at the institute during 1944–1952 and also 1966–1973.

The part of Yablonskaya's pictures Corn (Sacking Grain) and In the Park (both 1949), Festive Evening (1960), Together with Father (1962), Wedding (1963), Youth and Nameless Heights (both 1969), Life Goes On (1971), Evening. Old Florence (1973), and many others are part of the heritage of Soviet art.

In 1949, she finished a large, nearly four-metre canvas Sacking Grain, which reflects the joyous confidence of people, the feeling of triumphant enthusiasm common to millions of people who had left behind the burden of war. The mounds of golden grain, the flushed and smiling faces of collective farmers, the sunlight permeating the whole scene - this captured the mood of the whole country, communicating the general optimism and zest for work in the post-war years.

Yablonskaya's art is characterized by a constant search for ever new means of expression. Her last work shows that the philosophical tendency in her paintings comes to the fore, while her style is undergoing a certain transformation, assuming a more laconic and restrained character.

She was elected as a Member of parliament of the Ukrainian Soviet Socialistic Republic (Ukrainian Verkhovna Rada, English Supreme Council) in 1951–58, became a member of the Ukrainian Artists' Union in 1944, a member of the board of the USSR Artists' Union in 1963, and a member of the Academy of Art of the USSR in 1975.

Yablonska was awarded the honorary title "Peoples' Artists of the USSR" in 1982, "Artist of Year" (UNESCO) in 1997, "Woman of Year" (International Biography Centre, Cambridge) in 2000. She was the winner of the USSR State Prize (Stalin prize: 1949, 1951 and State Prize: 1979), and winner of the Shevchenko state prize of Ukraine (1998). She also received the Order of the Red Banner of Labour (1951), the Order of Friendship of Peoples (1977), order Award for merits (1997) and the highest state award of Ukraine – title Hero of Ukraine (2003).

Tetyana Yablonska worked very productively until the very end of her life, reportedly painting her last pastel etude on the very day of her death in Kyiv on June 17, 2005.

Her students include Mikhail Turovsky.

== See also ==
- Morning (Yablonska)

== Literature ==
- В. Курильцева. "Татьяна Ниловна Яблонская". Москва: Советский художник, 1959.
- Т. Яблонская. "Жизнь. Альбом". Москва: Советский художник, 1973.
- Е. Короткевич. "Татьяна Яблонская. Живопись. Рисунок." / Серия "Мастера советского искусства" Москва: Советский Художник, 1980.
- Tyshkevich, Marysia (24 February 2023). "Тетяна Яблонська: У мене в паспорті було записано – колгоспниця" [Tatiana Yablonskaya: I was written in my passport - the collective farm]. Ukrainian Interest (in Ukrainian). Kyiv.
