= Vladimir Serov (painter) =

Russian painter and politician (1910–1968)

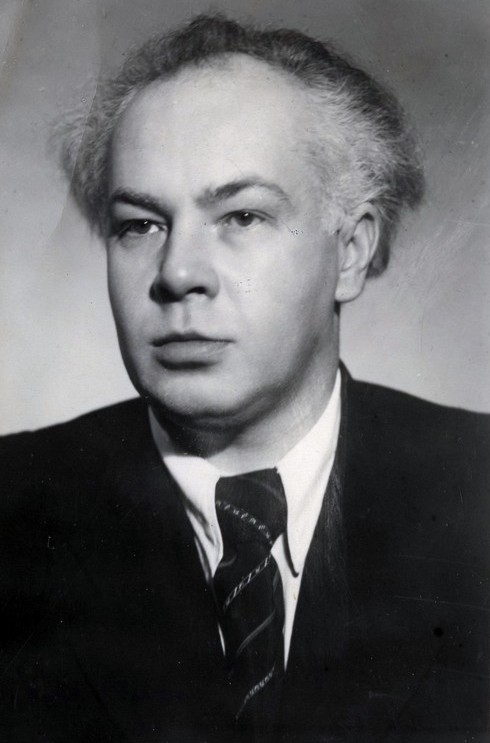
- Vladimir Serov, 1948
- Born: 21 July 1910; Emmaus village, Tverskoy Uyezd, Tver Governorate, Russian Empire
- Died: 19 January 1968 (aged 57); Moscow, Russia SFSR, Soviet Union
- Resting place: Novodevichy Cemetery, Moscow
- Citizenship: Soviet
- Movement: Socialist realism
- Awards: Order of Lenin

Vladimir Aleksandrovich Serov (Russian: Влади́мир Алекса́ндрович Серо́в; 21 July 1910 – 19 January 1968) was a Soviet painter, illustrator and teacher.

== Biography ==
Serov was born to a family of rural teachers. He studied at the Leningrad Institute of Proletarian Fine Arts (now Repin Institute), graduating in 1931 and subsequently studying under Isaak Brodsky until 1933. Then he worked as a teacher at the Institute of Proletarian Fine Arts. During the Second World War, Serov stayed in the besieged Leningrad and, as president of the Leningrad Union of Artists, took part in the work of the artist group Boyevoi Karandash (Fighting Pencil).

From 1951, he was a member of the Soviet Academy of Arts and was elected as its president in 1962. In 1960, he was First Secretary of the Board of the Union of Artists of the RSFSR and served in that position until his death.

Serov was also active as a politician. He became a member of the Communist Party of the Soviet Union in 1942 and was a member of its Central Auditing Commission from 1961. He was also a member of the Supreme Soviet of the Russian SFSR from 1958.

He was buried at the Novodevichy Cemetery in Moscow.

== Works ==
Servov's paintings depicted historical-revolutionary themes, portraits, landscapes and still lifes. In the artist's paintings, dedicated to the events of the October Revolution and the first years of Soviet power, historical events are interpreted in the spirit of official Soviet historiography of the 1940s and 1960s.

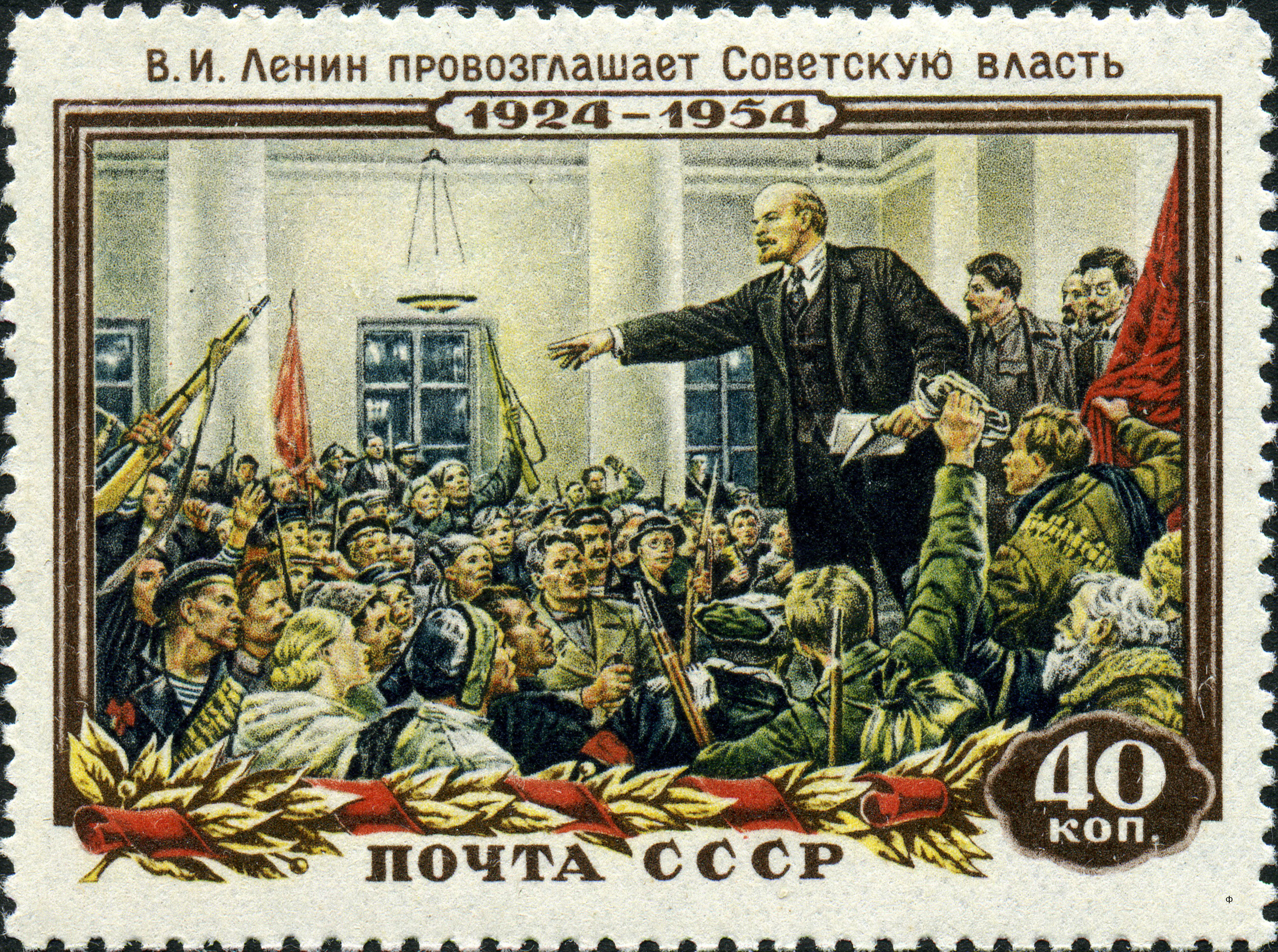

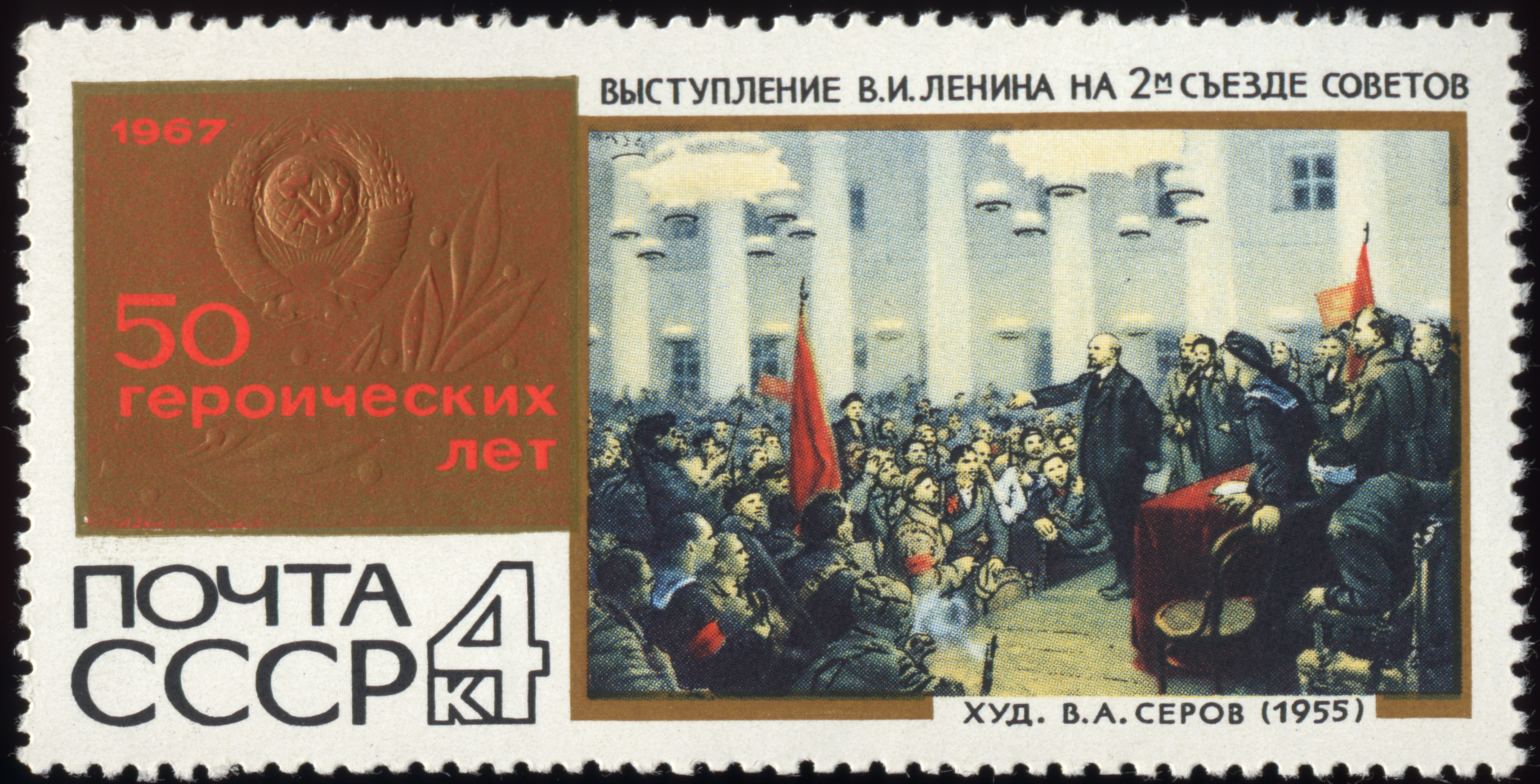

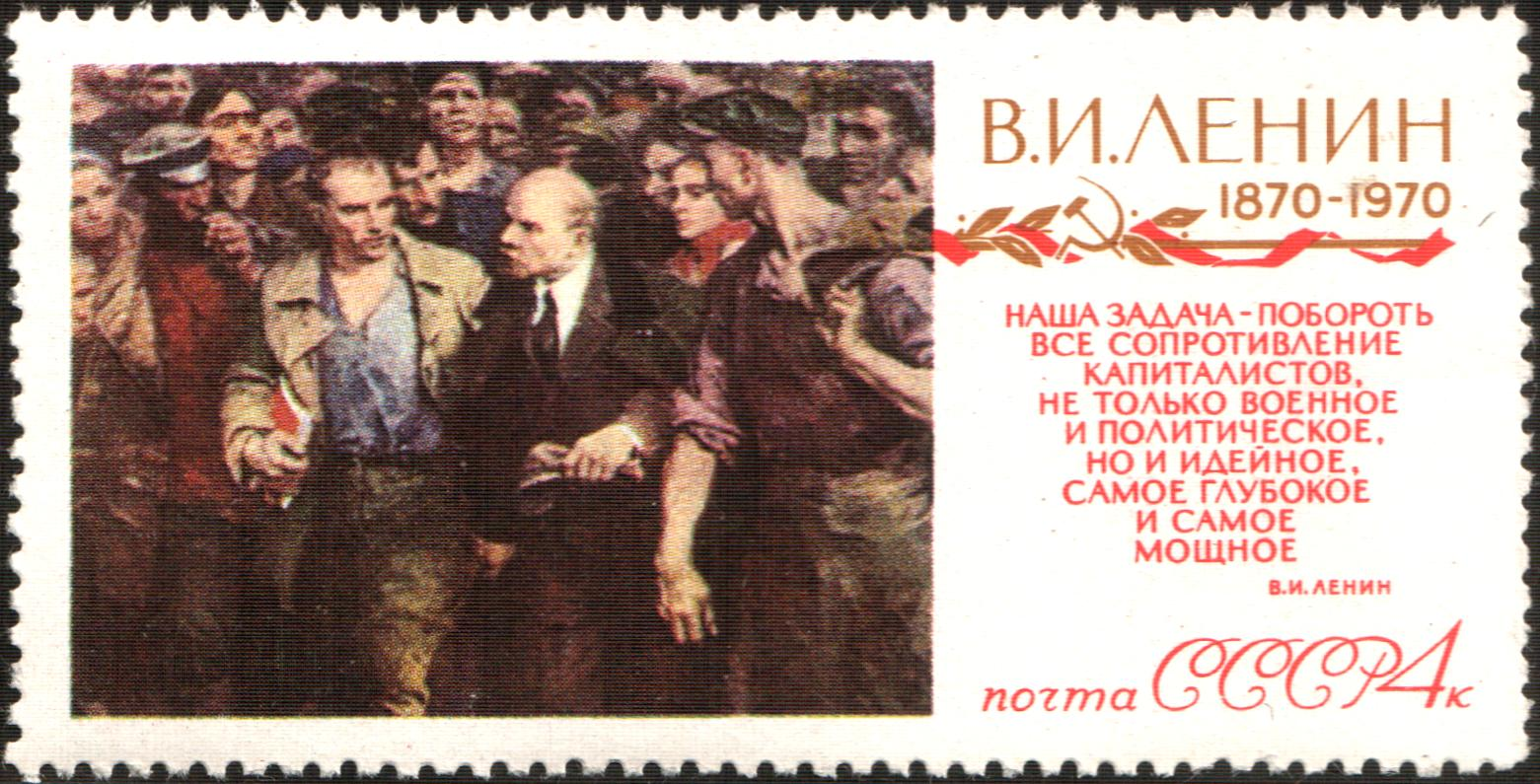

== See also ==
- Winter Palace Taken
