= Real socialism =

Soviet-type economic planning enforced by the ruling communist parties

Real socialism, actually existing socialism or developed socialism was an ideological catchphrase popularized during the Brezhnev era in the Eastern Bloc countries and the Soviet Union.

The term referred to the Soviet-type economic planning implemented by the Eastern Bloc at that particular time. From the 1960s onward, Communist states such as Poland, East Germany, Hungary, Czechoslovakia, and Bulgaria began to argue that their policies represented what was realistically feasible given their level of productivity.

The concept of real socialism alluded to a highly developed socialist system in the future. The actual party claims of nomenclatory socialism began to acquire not only negative, but also sarcastic meanings. In later years and especially after the dissolution of the Soviet Union, the term began to be remembered as a reference to Soviet-style socialism. (Note: See definitions and descriptions of "real socialism" in the following: Kyu-Young Lee, "System Transformation in Poland since 1989: A view on the transformation of the real-socialist system. Including List of References. Graduate School of International Studies, Sogang University.; Krzysztof Brzechczyn, The Collapse of Real Socialism in Eastern Europe. Adam Mickiewicz University, Department of Philosophy. The Journal of Interdisciplinary Studies in History and Archaeology. Vol. 1, No. 2, pp. 105–133; Tittenbrun, Jacek (1993). The Collapse of 'Real Socialism' in Poland. Paul & Co Pub Consortium. ISBN 1-85756-043-4.; Robert W. Cox, "Real socialism" in historical perspective. Pages 177–183. Retrieved November 3, 2011. See term: "actually existing socialism" in Rudolph Bahro's The Alternative in Eastern Europe, Note 3, p. 190.)

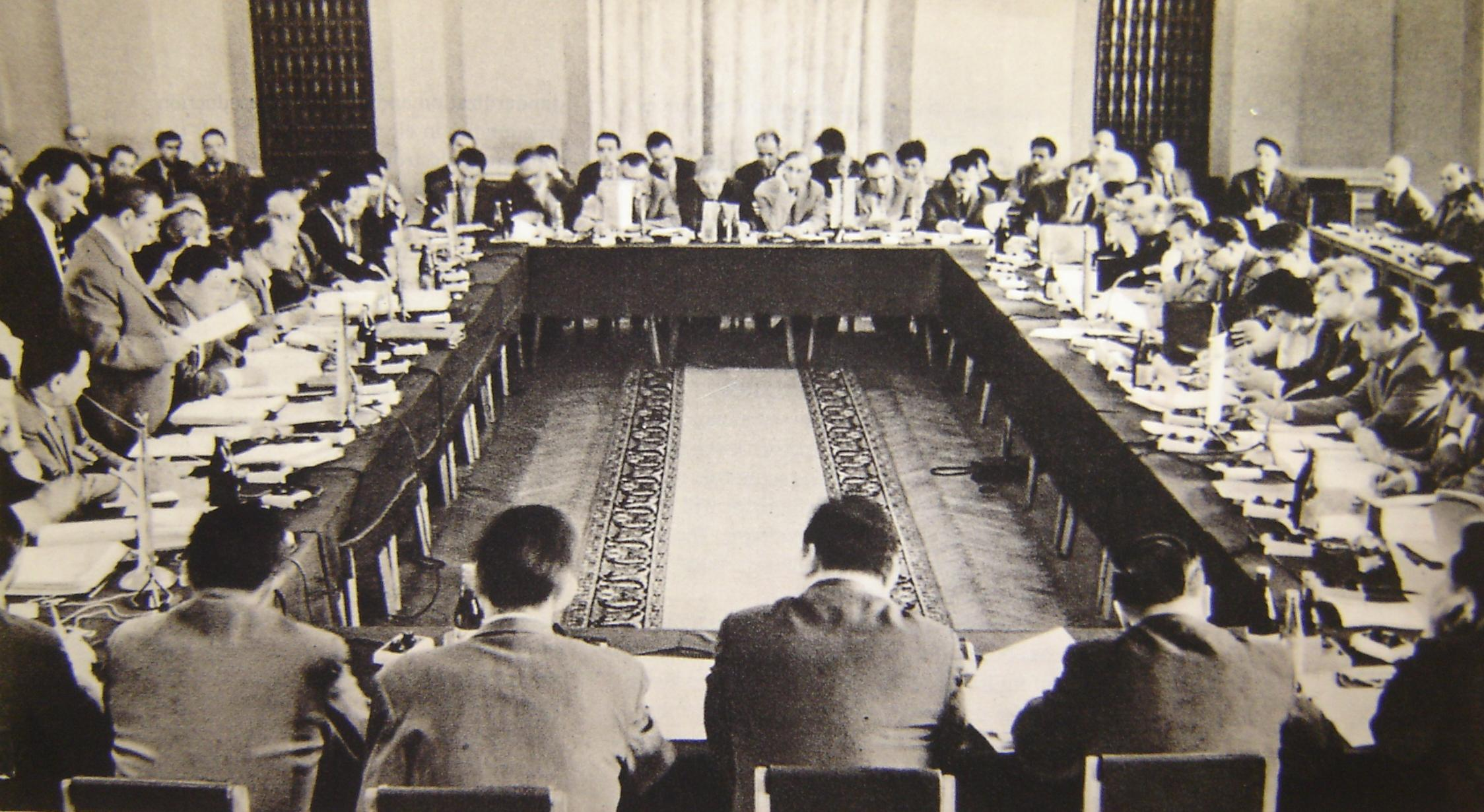
The executive committee of the Comecon in session

== Definition ==
After World War II, the terms "real socialism" or "really existing socialism" gradually became the predominating euphemisms used as self-description of the Eastern Bloc states' political and economical systems and their society models. De jure often referred to as "people's republics", these states were ruled by a communist party, all of which were ruled autocratically and had adapted a form of planned economy and propagated socialism or communism as their ideology. The term "real (-ly existing) socialism" was introduced to explain the obvious gap between the propagated ideological framework and the political and economical reality faced by these states' societies. As US Communist Party activist Irwin Silber put it in 1994,

The term 'actually existing socialism' is not (despite the quotation marks) a sarcasm; in fact, while obviously containing an implicit irony, the phrase itself was coined by Soviet Marxist-Leninists and was widely used by the Communist Party of the Soviet Union (CPSU) and its supporters in polemics with those who postulated a model of socialism significantly different from the system developed in the Soviet Union. Its point was that various alternatives to the Soviet-derived model existed only in the minds of their advocates, while 'actual socialism' existed in the real world.

The term was also taken up by some dissidents, such as Rudolf Bahro, who used it in a more critical way.

Richard Gilman-Opalsky argues that advocates of actually existing socialism neglect the aspirations of both Mao and Soviet leaders which were different from the systems and structures they achieved in practice, and their own denials that they had achieved socialism. He suggests that wholeheartedly endorsing actually existing socialism aligns with anti-communist perspectives and

== See also ==
- Actually existing capitalism
- "Communism in 20 years"
- Communist state
- Marxism–Leninism
- Moderately prosperous society
- Primary stage of socialism
- Soviet-type economic system
- State socialism
- Transition economy
- Developed socialism
