= Moral Code of the Builder of Communism =

Honor code of the Communist Part of the USSR

Moral Code of the Builder of Communism (Russian: Моральный кодекс строителя коммунизма) was a set of twelve codified moral rules in the Soviet Union which every member of the Communist Party of the USSR and every Komsomol member were supposed to follow.

The Moral Code was adopted at the 22nd Congress of the Communist Party of the Soviet Union in 1961, as part of the new Third Program.

The very first moral principle was "Devotion to the cause of communism".

Its twelve rules may be superficially compared to the Ten Commandments, but they overlap only marginally (although in Russian-speaking books and media one may sometimes see the claims about foundations in the Bible, referring to, e.g., "he who does not work, neither shall he eat" (2 Thessalonians 3:10); also used in the 1936 Soviet Constitution). Unlike the Ten Commandments, however, the rules of the Code were not concrete rules of conduct; they were stated as the rules of attitude. For example, "You shall not commit adultery" of Moses loosely corresponds to "Mutual respect in a family, concern about the upbringing of children" of the Code.

Another notable distinction is that the Moral Code speaks in terms of the relation of a person to the society, rather than in terms of personal virtues. For example, the "Do not steal" may be loosely matched to "Concern of everyone about the preservation and multiplication of the common wealth".

Russian legislator and Communist Party leader Gennady Zyuganov compared the moral code of the builder of communism to the Sermon on the Mount.

== Twelve rules of the Builder of Communism ==
These are the twelve rules which were written as a part of the Third Party Programme:

- Loyalty to Communism, and love of the socialist motherland and of the other socialist countries.
- Conscientious labor for the good of the society - he who does not work, neither shall he eat.
- Concern on the part of everyone for the preservation and growth of public wealth.
- A high sense of the public duty; intolerance of actions harmful to the public interest.
- Collectivism and comradery mutual assistance: one for all and all for one.
- Humane relations and mutual respect between individuals - man is to a man a friend, comrade and brother.
- Honesty and truthfulness, moral purity, modesty and unpretentiousness in social and private life.
- Mutual respect in the family, and concern for the upbringing of the children.
- An uncompromising attitude to injustice, parasitism, dishonesty, careerism, and money-grabbing.
- Friendship and brotherhood with all peoples of the USSR; intolerance to all racial and national hatred.
- An uncompromising attitude to the enemies of communism, peace and freedom of nations.
- Fraternal solidarity with the working people of all countries, and with all peoples.

== See also ==
- Prussian virtues
- Eight Honors and Eight Shames
