= State of the whole people =

The Communist Party of the Soviet Union (CPSU) defined the socialist state of the whole people (Russian: общенародное государство) as the type of state of the Soviet Union. It denoted that the Soviet Union had moved away from the socialist state of workers and peasants based on the dictatorship of the proletariat to a new socialist state type of the whole people since the exploitative classes had been vanquished. The working class was no longer to be the ruling class of the state alone, and all social groups were to be given equal representation in the state. The concept of the all-people's state (Russian: всенародное государство) was discussed for the draft of the Third Programme of the All-Union Communist Party (Bolsheviks) in 1947 and eventually entered the Third Program of the CPSU in 1961 as the "state of the whole people". This term was later added into the 1977 Soviet Constitution, which stated: "Having fulfilled the tasks of the dictatorship of the proletariat, the Soviet state became a state of the whole people". In other words, the state of the whole people is characteristic of developed socialism.

== Criticism ==
Not everyone greeted this concept positively. The idea that the dictatorship of the proletariat had ceased to exist before the withering away of the state proved controversial since it broke with the Marxist conception of a ruling class—the state only exists as a tool for class domination. The theoretical newspaper of the Central Committee of the Chinese Communist Party (CCP) deemed Khrushchev to be a revisionist: "a more dangerous enemy of Communist unity than rebels such as [Josep Broz] Tito of Yugoslavia and Leon Trotsky". The CCP still holds this position, and Wang Weiguang, President of the Chinese Academy of Social Sciences from 2013 to 2018 and member of the 18th CCP Central Committee, states, "Since the state is a product of class struggle, the state cannot be supra-historical, supra-class, and all-people, but has to have a class basis."
