= Communism in 20 years =

1961 political slogan of Nikita Khrushchev

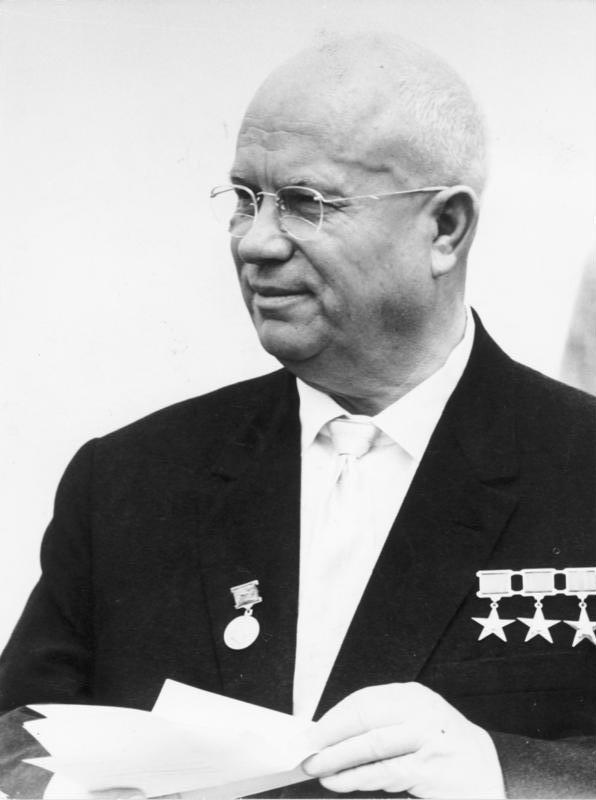
Nikita Khrushchev

"Communism in 20 years" was a slogan put forth by Nikita Khrushchev at the 22nd Congress of the Communist Party of the Soviet Union in 1961. Khrushchev's quote from his speech at the Congress was from this phrase: "We are strictly guided by scientific calculations. And calculations show that in 20 years we will build mainly a communist society". (Note: Russian original text: "Мы руководствуемся строго научными расчётами. А расчёты показывают, что за 20 годы мы построим в основном коммунистическое общество")

In his speech, Khrushchev promised that the communist society would be built "in the main" by 1980. His assertion that "The current generation of Soviet people will live under communism" was the final phrase of the Third Program of the CPSU, which was adopted at the congress (but was later removed).

The latter political slogan is attributed to Kremlin speechwriter Elizar Kuskov, who allegedly quipped "this slogan will survive centuries", (Note: "[Something] will survive centuries" (Russian: переживёт века, romanized: perezhivyot veka) is a Russian cliché to express an expected longevity.) expressing a cynical attitude as to whether the goal could genuinely be attained.

== See also ==
- Real socialism
