= Developed socialism =

Endonymic term used by the CPSU to describe the late-Soviet political economy

Developed socialism (Russian: Развито́й социали́зм), formally developed socialist society, is according to the historiography of the Communist Party of the Soviet Union, a stage in the socialist mode of production that the Soviet Union claimed to have reached in 1961. No other communist state or party has ever claimed to have reached this stage. The class system of developed socialism is the socialist state of the whole people, which emerges during this stage of development.

According to the official Soviet dictionary Scientific Communism, this stage was "characterised by the advanced, dynamic maturity of socialism as an integral social system, the complete realisation of its objective laws and advantages, and its progress towards the higher phase of communism." This concept began to be questioned after Leonid Brezhnev's death in 1982 when his successor Yuri Andropov made it clear that the Soviet Union had only reached the beginning of a "long historical stage" of developed socialism and the task remained to "perfect" it. The term was used sparingly under Mikhail Gorbachev, and the CPSU program adopted by the 27th Congress in 1986 only noted that the Soviet Union "had entered the stage of developed socialism" in 1961. At the 27th Congress, Gorbachev revealed that many wanted to discard the concept altogether while others wanted a more extensive exploration of it. The adopted programme was, in this sense, a compromise, stating that the Soviet Union had entered the stage of developed socialism and not that it was a developed socialist society.

== Bibliography ==
- Evans, Jr., Alfred B. (1993). Soviet Marxism–Leninism: The Decline of an Ideology. Greenwood Publishing Group. ISBN 0-275-94549-9.
- Rumyantsev, Aleksei Matveyevich, ed. (1984). A Dictionary of Scientific Communism. Progress Publishers.
- Sandle, Mark (2005). A Short History of Soviet Socialism. University College London Press. ISBN 0-203-55919-3.
