= Academy of Arts of the Soviet Union =

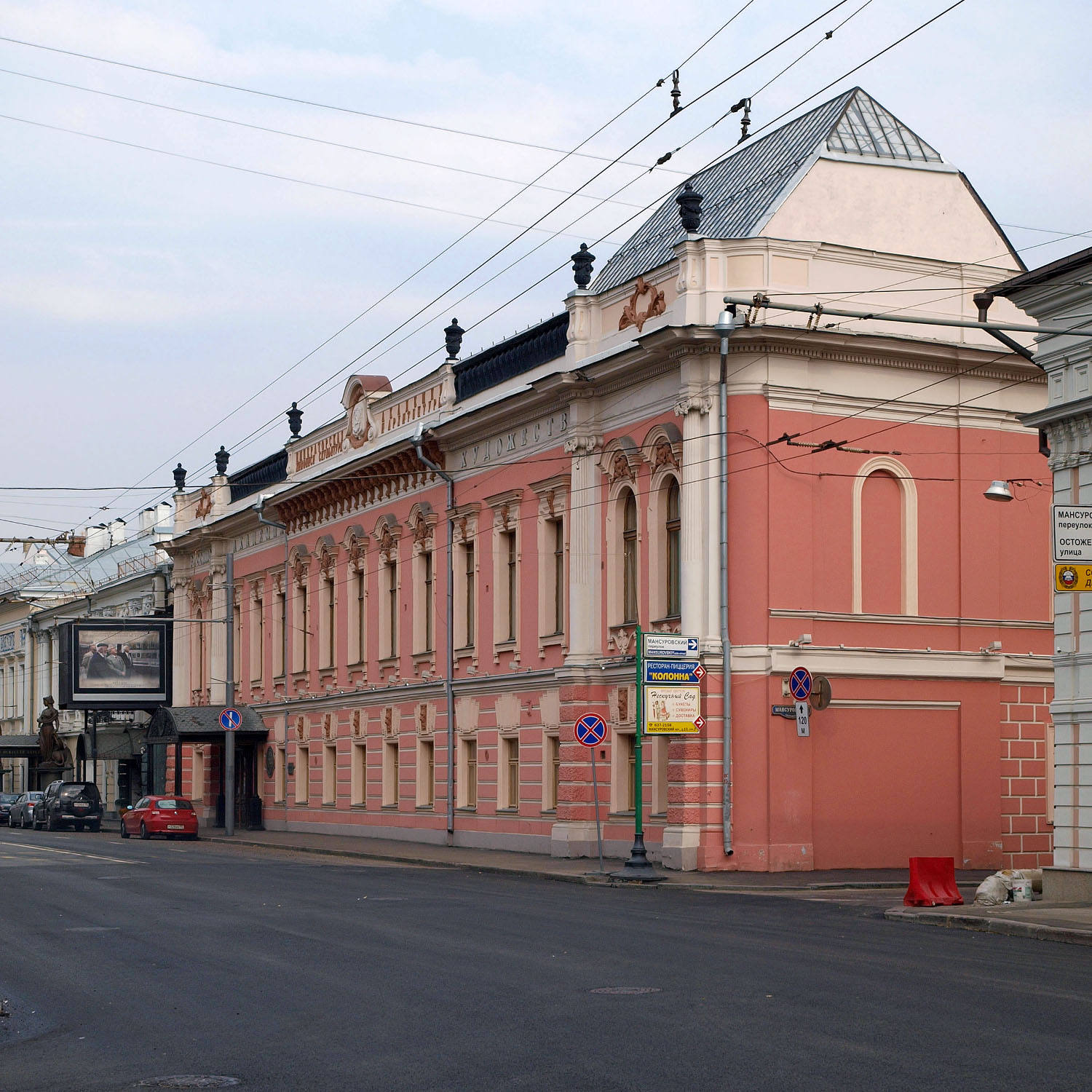
- Building of Presidium of the Arts Academy (former I. A. Morozov's mansion)
- Other name: AKH SSSR (rus. Акаде́мия худо́жеств СССР)
- Established: 5 August 1947
- President: Aleksandr Gerasimov (first); Nikolai Ponomarev (last)
- Location: Moscow, Russian SFSR, Soviet Union
- Dissolved: 1991

The Academy of Arts of the Soviet Union (Russian: Акаде́мия худо́жеств СССР) was the highest artistic institution in the field of visual arts in the Soviet Union.

== History ==
After the Imperial Academy of Arts was liquidated, the Higher Art School continued to operate in Petrograd. Initially, the school was renamed the Free Art School, and from October 1918, the Petrograd State Free Art Training Workshops. In 1922, the workshops were transformed into the Higher Art and Technical Institute (Vkhutemas).

By the resolution of the All-Russian Central Executive Committee and the Council of People's Commissars of October 11, 1932, “On the creation of the Academy of Arts,” a higher educational institution, the All-Russian Academy of Arts, was opened in Leningrad.

By decree of the Council of Ministers of the Soviet Union on August 5, 1947, the Academy of Arts of the Soviet Union, with its base in Moscow, was formed on the basis of the former All-Russian Academy of Arts. The academy was considered the successor to the classical traditions of the Imperial Academy of Arts, and at the same time, at the Soviet stage of its existence, it was called upon to “promote the creative development of the principles of socialist realism.”

The tasks of the Academy of Arts included methodological guidance of art education in the Soviet Union, working with young artists, and organization of art exhibitions in the Soviet Union and abroad. The publishing house of the Academy of Arts published textbooks and manuals. The academy was also involved in creating artistic concepts for parks and squares. The Surikov and Repin Institutes of the USSR Academy of Arts were the highest level of a consistent system of artistic education.

Important issues were decided by the General Meeting of Full Members and Corresponding Members of the academy - the highest governing body. In normal times, leadership was exercised by the Presidium of the Academy, headed by the president.

In Russia, the Russian Academy of Arts became the legal successor of the Academy of Arts of the Soviet Union.

== Structure ==
Representatives of Soviet art were elected to the academy, while foreign artists could be elected honorary members of the academy. On July 1, 1969, the academy consisted of 39 full members, 61 corresponding members, 10 honorary members and subsequently, their number grew. At the end of the 1970s, the academy consisted of 61 full members and 95 corresponding members.

The academy system included:

- Research Institute of Theory and History of Fine Arts in Moscow
- Moscow State Academic Art Institute, named after V. I. Surikov with a secondary art school
- Institute of Painting, Sculpture and Architecture named after. I. E. Repin in Leningrad with a secondary art school;
- Siberian-Far Eastern Branch, now the "Ural, Siberia, Far East" branch, located in Krasnoyarsk

Scientific Research Museum in Leningrad with branches:

- Museum-apartment of I. I. Brodsky in Leningrad
- Museum-estate of I. E. Repin “Penates” in the village of Repino, Leningrad region;
- Memorial Museum-Workshop of Konenkov in Moscow
- Scientific Library, Scientific Bibliographic Archive in Leningrad

And workshops:

- Creative workshops in Moscow, Leningrad, Kyiv, Tbilisi, Baku, Minsk, Kazan, Riga, Frunze, Tashkent
- Production workshops and laboratories in Leningrad.

== Presidents ==
- Aleksandr Gerasimov (1947–1957)
- Boris Ioganson (1957–1962)
- Vladimir Serov (1962–1968)
- Nikolai Tomsky (1968–1982)
- Boris Ugarov (1983– 1991)
- Nikolai Ponomarev (1991–1992)
