= 22nd Congress of the Communist Party of the Soviet Union =

1961 meeting of Soviet delegates

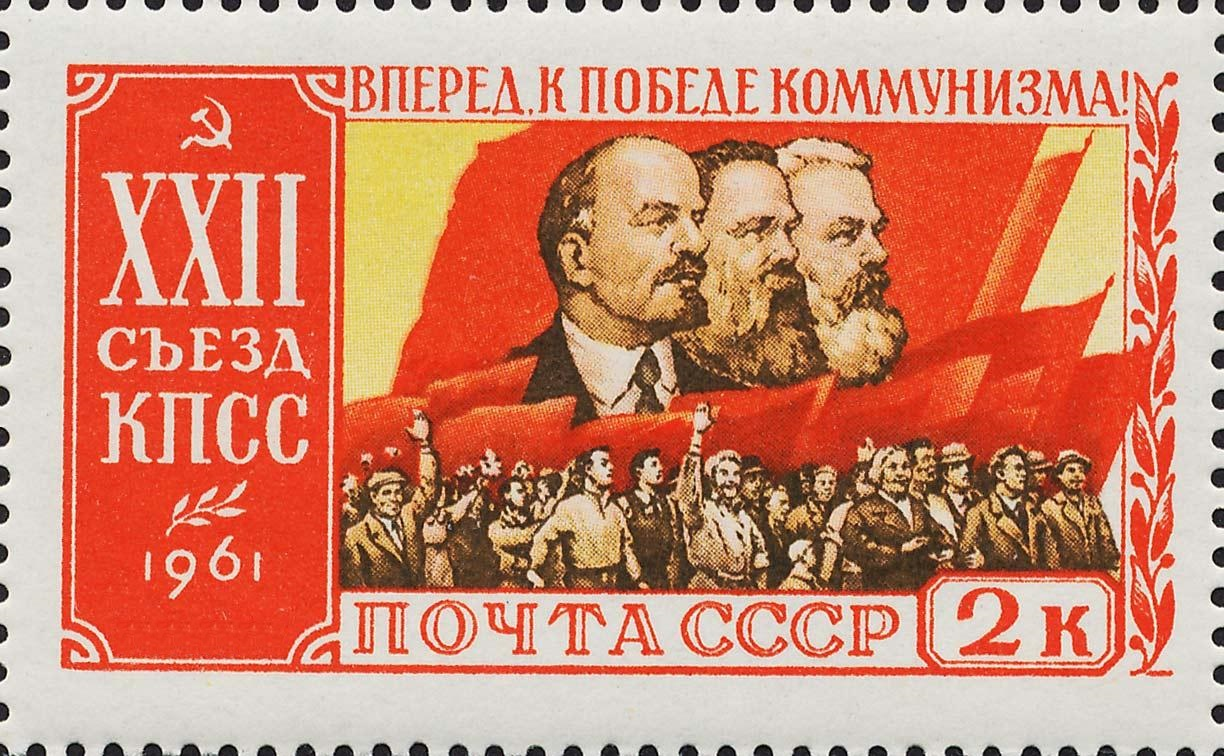
1961 USSR Postal Stamp, celebrating the 22nd Congress

The 22nd Congress of the Communist Party of the Soviet Union (Russian: XXII съезд КПСС) was held from 17 to 31 October 1961. In fourteen days of sessions (22 October was a day off), 4,413 delegates, in addition to delegates from 83 foreign Communist parties, listened to Nikita Khrushchev and others review policy issues. At the Congress, the Sino-Soviet split hardened, especially due to Soviet de-Stalinization efforts, and it was the last Congress to be attended by the Chinese Communist Party. The Congress elected the 22nd Central Committee.

== Speeches, splits, plans ==
Other than Sino-Soviet disputes, matters dealt with at the Congress included accepting the Third Program of the CPSU and statute, and the opening of the Volgograd Hydroelectric Plant, the largest in Europe or Russia at the time. The Soviets also tested the world's most powerful thermonuclear bomb ("Tsar Bomba") in Novaya Zemlya in the Arctic Circle, creating the largest man-made explosion in history. They also accepted the removal of Stalin's remains from the Lenin Mausoleum, the renaming of several cities named after Stalin and other Stalin-era politicians, and Khrushchev's declaration and plans to build communism in 20 years. Historian Archie Brown wrote that the program was "the last authoritative document produced by the Communist Party of the Soviet Union to take entirely seriously the building of a communist society." Nikita Khrushchev also proposed to revise CPSU's statutes and implement a "systematic renewal of cadres" that would limit terms of individuals in elected party posts and rules for turnover in other Party bodies, worrying that "a gradual freezing of personnel policy would block up the system, and stagnation would occur." However, the proposal was opposed by other Party members. It is believed that Khrushchev's proposal contributed to his later oust from power.

The Chinese Communist Party sent a delegation led by Zhou Enlai, with Peng Zhen and Kang Sheng to attend the Congress. Zhou and his colleagues placed a separate wreath 'Dedicated to the great Marxist, Comrade Stalin'. During the meeting, Zhou expressed opposition to Khrushchev's attack on Albania and left earlier on October 23 after his views were refuted.

== See also ==
- Berlin Crisis of 1961
