= Third Program of the CPSU =

Party platform

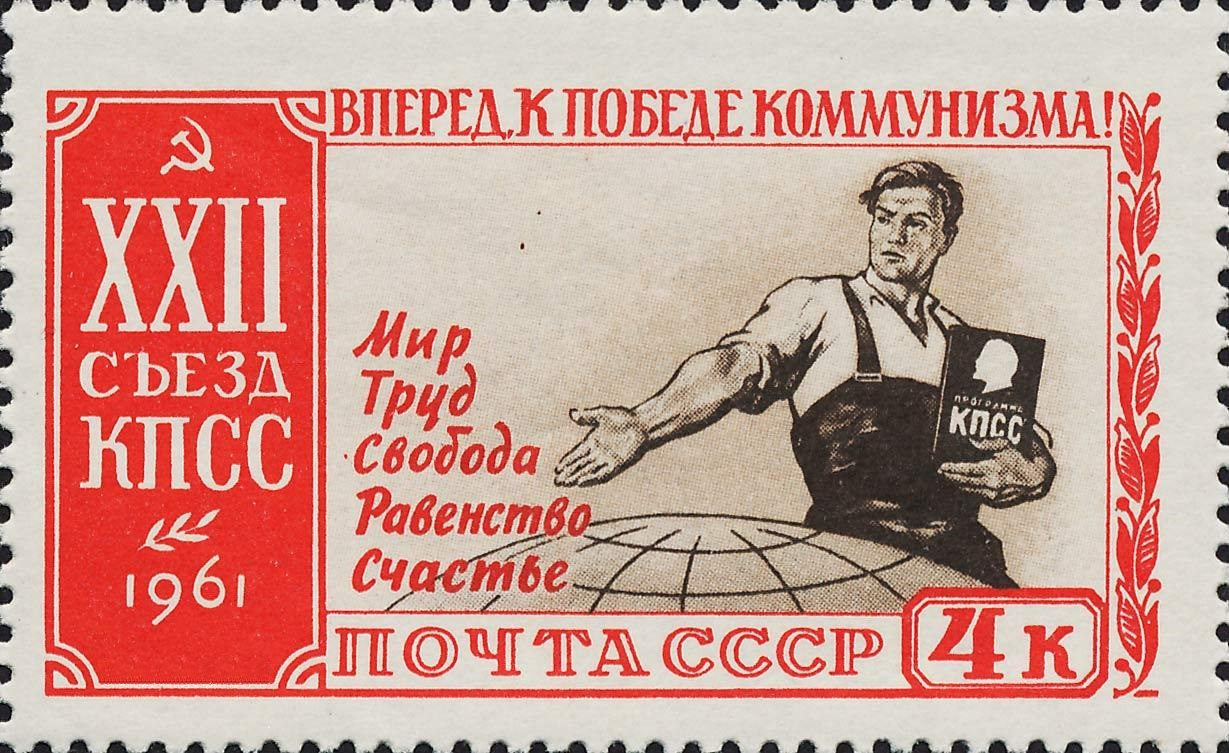
Postage stamp commemorating the 22nd Congress of the Communist Party of the Soviet Union

The Third Program of the CPSU was the party platform of the Communist Party of the Soviet Union, adopted at its 22nd Congress on 31 October 1961. The main goal of the program was to create a plan for the construction of communism. (It was the first and only program that was approved while the party had this name; previous programs were approved when the party was named RSDLP and VKP(b).)

The core of the new approach to building communism was an attempt to replace Stalin's harsh administrative "pressure from above" with socialist self-government based on the principles of communist morality. The moral code of the builder of communism was an integral part of the Third Program, and so are the renewal of Druzhinas and Comrades' courts, and the general introduction of the moral principles of collectivism, initiative, comradely mutual assistance, and personal responsibility for the collective good. Many of these social reforms later formed the basis of understanding the 1960 in the Soviet Union (Khrushchev Thaw and early Stagnation).

== History ==
The 19th Congress came to the conclusion that fundamental changes had taken place since the adoption of the Second Program of the Party. Consequently, the congress decided to consider it necessary to rework the Party Program. At the 20th Congress, the Central Committee was instructed "to prepare a draft program of the CPSU, based on the main provisions of Marxist-Leninist theory, creatively developing on the basis of the historical experience of our party, the experience of the fraternal parties of the socialist countries, the experience and achievements of the entire international communist and workers' movement, and taking into account the long-term plan being prepared for communist construction, development of the economy and culture of the Soviet Union".

To develop the draft program, a working group was created, which was located in the "Sosny" sanatorium retreat of the Administration of the Central Committee of the CPSU in the Moscow region, headed by Secretary of the Central Committee of the CPSU Boris Ponomarev. Initial work on the creation of a draft of the new program began in mid-1958, and eventually, about 100 major scientists and specialists worked on it for three years.

In June 1958, on behalf of Otto Kuusinen, one of the secretaries and a member of the Presidium of the Central Committee of the CPSU, thematic assignments were sent to scientific institutions, government departments and public organizations. Special tasks were assigned to academicians Eugen Varga and Stanislav Strumilin, and they subsequently prepared the article "On the Ways of Building Communism", which provided development prospects for 10–15 years. On 25 July 1959 the Presidium set the accents: academicians will deal with the theory, and the practical calculations, that is, how much, when and where will the industry and agriculture produce, should be submitted by the State Planning Commission (Gosplan) and the State Economic Commission.

By the spring of 1961, work on the project was completed, and its text was given to the First Secretary of the CPSU Central Committee Nikita Khrushchev. In late April 1961, he formulated his comments on the program. Khrushchev's close ally, Anastas Mikoyan, also provided his input, particularly on the nationality section, where he rejected the merger (sliianie) of nationalities in favor of a more inclusive policy. After appropriate revision, the draft program was considered on 24 May at the Presidium of the Central Committee of the CPSU and on 19 June at the Plenum of the Central Committee. On 26 July 1961, at a meeting of the Presidium of the Central Committee of the CPSU, the text of the draft program provided by the program commission was approved.

== National discussion ==
On 30 July 1961 the text of the draft program was published in the Pravda and Izvestia newspapers so that the population could familiarize themselves with it and express suggestions and comments. Local party cells sent reports to the capital on the discussion of the draft party program. Newspapers and magazines were supposed to collect letters from the population that came to the editors and related to the draft program, and send them for processing and analysis to specially created working groups that summarized proposals on various topics, for example, on the ethnic issues.

By 15 September 1961, 6 magazines and 20 newspapers received a total of 29,070 pieces of correspondence, of which 5,039 were published. In total, almost 44 million people attended party conferences and worker meetings dedicated to the discussion of this document. Taking into account the letters to local newspapers, party organs, radio and television, the number of published pieces was 17,080 according to data cited by the historian Aleksandr Pyzhikov. "There were some interesting comments about the Programme" in these texts, writes historian Alexander Titov. "For example, there were numerous proposals for the abolition of private property and the end of special privileges for the top brass, such as chauffeured cars, dachas and special shops. The overall response was, however, what one could expect from such public exercise in the Soviet Union. The Party Programme was approved as it was presented by the draft committee, with only twenty amendments made to the Programme as the result of its discussion in the press and at the 22nd Party Congress, most of them editorial in nature."

== Structure ==
Introduction
Part One: TRANSITION FROM CAPITALISM TO COMMUNISM — THE PATH OF HUMANITY DEVELOPMENT

1. The historical inevitability of the transition from capitalism to socialism
2. The world-historical significance of the October Revolution and the victory of socialism in the USSR
3. World system of socialism
4. Crisis of world capitalism
5. International revolutionary movement of the working class
6. National liberation movement
7. Fight against bourgeois and reformist ideology
8. Peaceful coexistence and the struggle for universal peace

Part Two: TASKS OF THE COMMUNIST PARTY OF THE SOVIET UNION TO BUILD A COMMUNIST SOCIETY
Communism: the bright future of all mankind

1. The tasks of the party in the field of economic construction, the creation and development of the material and technical base of communism
  1. Development of industry, construction, transport, and their role in the creation of the productive forces of communism
  2. Development of agriculture and social relations in the countryside
  3. Management of the national economy and planning
2. Tasks of the party in the field of raising the material well-being of the people
3. Tasks of the party in the field of state building and further development of socialist democracy
  1. Councils and the development of democratic principles of public administration
  2. Further enhancement of the role of public organizations. State and communism
  3. Strengthening the Armed Forces and the defense capability of the Soviet Union
4. Tasks of the party in the field of ethnic relations
5. Tasks of the party in the field of ideology, upbringing, education, science and culture
  1. In the field of education of communist consciousness
  2. In the field of public education
  3. In the field of science
  4. In the field of cultural construction, literature and art
6. The building of communism in the USSR and the cooperation of the socialist countries
7. The party in the period of progressing construction of communism

== See also ==
- Moral Code of the Builder of Communism

== Bibliography ==
- ИнфоРост, Н. П. "Программа Коммунистической партии Советского Союза. [1961 г.]". docs.historyrussia.org. (in Russian)
- Programme of the Communist Party of the Soviet Union. Adopted by the 22nd Congress of the C.P.S.U. 31 October 1961 (in English)
- Немцев, Михаил Юрьевич (2016). "К истории советской академической дисциплины "Основы научного коммунизма"". Идеи и идеалы. 1 (27): 23–38. ISSN 2075-0862.
