= Neo-Sovietism =

Movement to revive Soviet ideologies

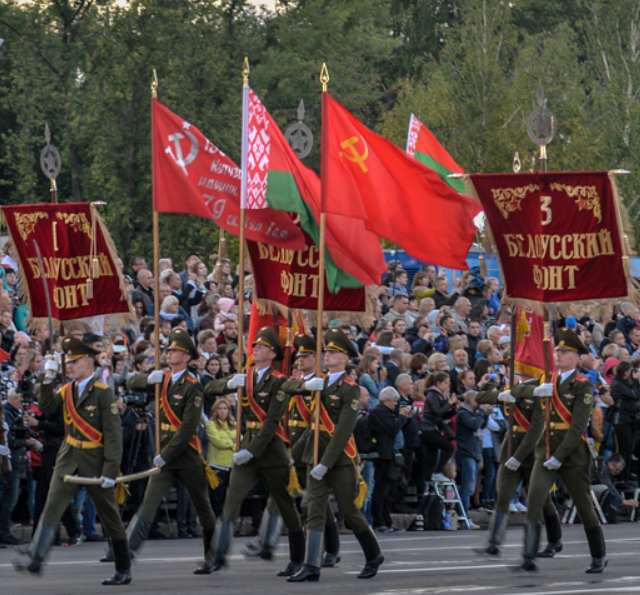
Belarusian Honor Guard carrying the national flags of Belarus and the Soviet Union, as well as the Soviet victory banner, in Minsk, 2019.

Neo-Sovietism, sometimes known as Re-Sovietization or Neo-Bolshevism, is the Soviet Union–style of policy decisions in some post-Soviet states, as well as a political movement of reviving the Soviet Union in the modern world or reviving specific aspects of Soviet life based on nostalgia for the Soviet Union.

== Neo-Sovietism in Russian state policies ==
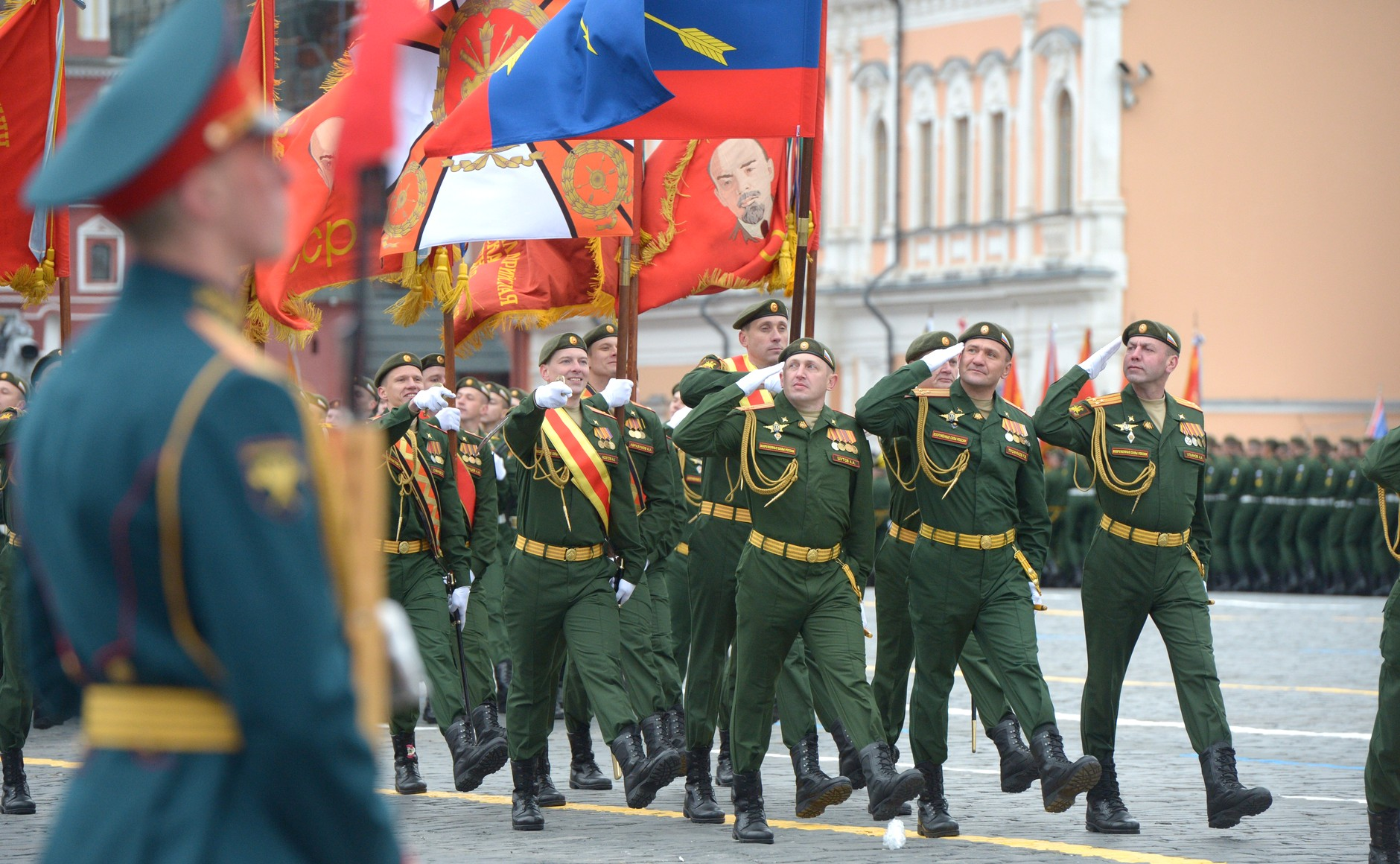
2021 Moscow Victory Day Parade. Military parades and Soviet military symbolism play an important role in the 9 May celebrations across Russia.

According to Pamela Druckerman of The New York Times, an element of neo-Sovietism is that "the government manages civil society, political life and the media".

According to Matthew Kaminski of The Wall Street Journal, it includes efforts by Vladimir Putin to express the glory of the Soviet Union in order to generate support for a "revived Great Russian power in the future" by bringing back memories of various Russian accomplishments that legitimatized Soviet dominance, including the Soviet victory against Nazi Germany. Kaminski continues on by saying that neo-Sovietism "offers up Russian jingoism stripped bare of Marxist internationalist pretenses" and uses it to scare Russia's neighbours and to generate Russian patriotism and anti-Americanism.

Andrew Meier of the Los Angeles Times in 2008 listed three points that laid out neo-Sovietism and how modern Russia resembles the Soviet Union:

- Russia was a land of doublespeak. Meier claims that Russia has deliberately distorted words and facts on various subjects, particularly regarding the Russo-Georgian War at the time by claiming that the United States instigated the conflict and that Georgia was committing genocide in South Ossetia.
- Russia was willing to enhance its power by any means possible, including harsh repression of its own citizens with examples being Mikhail Khodorkovsky and the Mothers of Beslan.
- Russia remains a land in which "fear of the state—and its suffocating reach—prevails" by introducing numerous laws that limit free expression and promote propaganda.

Some commentators have said that Russian President Vladimir Putin holds many neo-Soviet views, especially concerning law and order and military strategic defense.

Alexander Baunov, a senior fellow at the Carnegie Endowment for International Peace, claimed that Russia was undergoing the re-Sovietization of its democratic process, together with the re-Sovietization "of the whole Russian life." Baunov theorized that "Vladimir Putin is reconstructing...the environment, the time, the impressions of his youth [in the Soviet Union]," noting that under Putin's administration, Russia has reverted to many of the same norms with regard to political culture, society, and statecraft as the Soviet Union during the pre-Glasnost era.

== Neo-Sovietism in Belarusian state policies ==
In 2021, Jim Heintz of the Associated Press described Belarus as a neo-Soviet state due to the authoritarian nature of Alexander Lukashenko's government and its largely state-controlled economy.

According to Belarusian journalist Franak Viačorka, Belarus “clung to the traditions, symbols, and narratives of the USSR with more enthusiasm than any other former Soviet republic.” Viačorka asserts that the Belarusian government has deliberately retained many of "the specific statecraft and economic practices of the Communist era." Examples cited by Viačorka include Komsomol-style political youth organizations to obligatory university studies of the Soviet war effort against Nazi Germany.

A study by the Trans European Policy Studies Association described the Belarusian government's economic policies as neo-Soviet, due to the country's lack of well-defined private property rights and continued domination of the industrial sector by state-owned enterprises inherited from the Soviet Union.

In his book Belarus: The Last European Dictatorship, political scientist Andrew Wilson described the Belarusian state ideology as neo-Soviet. Wilson noted that many authoritarian institutions inherited from the Byelorussian Soviet Socialist Republic were preserved in Belarus after independence, including the local branch of the State Security Committee (KGB). Like its Soviet predecessor, the Belarusian government also retained strong control over mass media and the press, and even produced similar state propaganda.

== Separatist republics in eastern Ukraine ==
Andrew Kramer of the New York Times claimed that the Luhansk People's Republic and Donetsk People's Republic established by Russian separatist forces in Ukraine were neo-Soviet states. Kramer observed that the separatist legislatures were modeled after the Supreme Soviet, local industry was nationalized and seized by the separatist governments, and Soviet era agricultural collectives were revived. He also pointed out that some of the separatist political leaders, such as Boris Litvinov, were former dedicated members of the Communist Party of the Soviet Union, and remained sympathetic towards socialist ideology.

== Neo-Soviet organizations ==
- All-Union Communist Party (Bolsheviks) (1995)
- All-Union Communist Party of Bolsheviks (1991)
- Armenian Communist Party
- Azerbaijan United Communist Party
- Communist Party of Abkhazia
- Communist Party of the Russian Federation
- Communist Party of the Soviet Union (2001)
- Communist Party of Ukraine
- Communists of Russia
- Essence of Time
- National Bolshevik Front
- National Bolshevik Party
- Party of Communists of the Republic of Moldova
- Russian Communist Workers' Party of the Communist Party of the Soviet Union
- Union of Communist Parties – Communist Party of the Soviet Union
- Union of Communists

== See also ==
- Decommunization
  - Decommunization in Russia
  - Decommunization in Ukraine
  - List of monuments and memorials removed following the Russian invasion of Ukraine
- Eurasianism
  - Collective Security Treaty Organization (CSTO)
  - Commonwealth of Independent States (CIS)
  - Customs Union of the Eurasian Economic Union (EAEU)
  - Moscow, third Rome
  - Primakov doctrine
  - Russian imperialism
  - Russian world
- Limitrophe states
- Near abroad
- Neo-Ottomanism
- Neo-Stalinism
- Nostalgia for the Soviet Union
- Pan-Slavism
  - Neo-Slavism
  - Serbian–Montenegrin unionism
  - Union State of Russia and Belarus
  - Yugoslavism
    - Corfu Declaration
    - Kingdom of Serbs, Croats and Slovenes
    - Nostalgia for the SFR Yugoslavia
    - Timeline of Yugoslavia
    - Yugoslav colonization of Kosovo
    - Yugoslavs
- Putinism
- Second Cold War
- Sino-Soviet split
- Soviet Empire
- Soviet patriotism
- Sovietization
- Stalinobus
