= Communism in Russia =

Communism in Russia encompasses communist ideology, the communist movement and communist parties in Russia, including the rule of the Communist Party from late 1917 to 1991. Although the Soviet Union is often called a communist state, its leadership never claimed to have achieved communism: the ruling party described the Soviet system as socialist and regarded communism, a classless society in which the state would have withered away, as a later stage of development. The 1961 Party Programme proclaimed that "the present generation of Soviet people shall live in communism", and the 1977 Constitution stated that "a developed socialist society has been built" and called it "a natural, logical stage on the road to communism".

The February Revolution of 1917 led to the abdication of Tsar Nicholas II after significant pressure from the Duma and the military. After the abdication, Russia was governed by a provisional government composed of remnants of the dissolved Duma and the soviets—workers’ and soldiers’ councils—in a power-sharing system known as dvoevlastie (dual power). Later that year, the Bolsheviks, led by Vladimir Lenin, seized power in the October Revolution and established the Russian Soviet Republic. After the Russian Civil War ended in 1922, the Bolsheviks formally established the Union of Soviet Socialist Republics (USSR), with Lenin as its first leader.

Throughout the 20th century communism spread to various parts of the world, largely as a result of Soviet influence, often through revolutionary movements and post-World War II geopolitical shifts. The Cold War period saw a global ideological struggle between the communist bloc, led by the Soviet Union, and the capitalist West, led by the United States. Communist Party rule in Russia ended with the dissolution of the USSR in 1991, and though the event marked a significant decline in the global influence of communism, the ideology persists in some countries and continues to inspire political movements worldwide.

The Provisional Government was dominated by liberals and moderate socialists, however, the Bolsheviks refused to accept the government and revolted in October 1917, taking control of Russia. Vladimir Lenin, their leader, rose to power and governed between 1917 and 1924.

The Communist Party of the Russian Federation remains the second-largest political party after United Russia.

== Russian Revolution ==
=== February Revolution ===
The First World War placed an unbearable strain on Russia's government and economy, resulting in mass shortages and hunger. In the meantime, the mismanagement and failures of the war turned the people and importantly, the soldiers against the Tsar, whose decision to take personal command of the army seemed to make him personally responsible for the defeats. In February 1917, the Tsar first lost control of the streets, then of the soldiers, and finally of the Duma, resulting in his forced abdication on 2 March 1917.

On 26 February 1917 citywide strikes spread throughout Petrograd. Dozens of demonstrators were killed by troops. The crowds grew hostile forcing the soldiers to decide which side they were on. As the situation became critical, soldiers refused orders from the Tsar. On 26 February 1917 the Army abandoned the Tsar; the soldiers mutinied and refused to put down the riots. By 27 February 1917 the workers were in control of the entire city.

=== October Revolution ===
On 24–25 October 1917 the Bolsheviks and Left Socialist Revolutionaries organized a revolution, occupying government buildings, telegraph stations, and other strategic points. On 24 October 1917, the Red Guards took over bridges and telephone exchanges. On 25 and 26 October 1917 the Red Guards took over banks, government buildings, and railways stations. The cruiser Aurora fired blank shots at the Winter Palace signalling the start of the revolution. That night (9:40 pm), the Red Guards took over the Winter Palace and arrested the Provisional Government.

On 27 October 1917 Lenin proclaimed that all power now belonged to the Soviets of Workers', Soldiers' and Peasants' Deputies.

=== The Civil War ===
After Vladimir Lenin and Joseph Stalin took over the Soviet Union, many people still opposed the communist party. This led to the Civil War between the White Army and Red Army. The White Army included the opposition party, as well as foreign troops from 14 western nations. The Red Army included the armed forces of the government and people that supported Vladimir Lenin, as well as the worker's councils. The Civil War resulted in the deaths of 10–30 million people.

== Soviet socialism ==
Lenin argued that the capitalist class would remain a threat, even after a successful socialist revolution, especially given the foreign influence of capitalist nations. As a result, he advocated the repression of those elements of the capitalist class that took up arms against the new soviet government, writing that as long as classes existed a state would need to exist to exercise the democratic rule of one class (in his view, the working class) over the other (the capitalist class). Lenin wrote that "[d]ictatorship does not necessarily mean the abolition of democracy for the class that exercises the dictatorship over other classes; but it does mean the abolition of democracy (or very material restriction, which is also a form of abolition) for the class over which, or against which, the dictatorship is exercised." After World War I, Karl Kautsky became a critic of the Bolshevik Revolution, and was famously denounced by Lenin as a "renegade".

The use of violence, terror and rule of a single communist party was criticised by other Marxists, including Karl Kautsky, and Rosa Luxemburg, as well as Anarcho-Communists like Peter Kropotkin.

Soviet democracy granted voting rights to the majority of the populace who elected the local soviets, who elected the regional soviets and so on until electing the Supreme Soviet of the Soviet Union. Capitalists were disenfranchised in the Russian soviet model. However, according to Lenin, in a developed country, it would be possible to dispense with the disenfranchisement of capitalists within the democratic proletarian dictatorship, as the proletariat would be guaranteed an overwhelming majority. The Bolsheviks in 1917–1924 did not claim to have achieved a communist society. In contrast the preamble to the 1977 Constitution (Fundamental Law) of the Union of Soviet Socialist Republics (the "Brezhnev Constitution"), stated that the 1917 Revolution established the dictatorship of the proletariat as "a society of true democracy" and that "the supreme goal of the Soviet state is the building of a classless, communist society in which there will be public, communist self-government."

=== The Cold War ===
The Cold War was a time of ideological, political, and economic conflict between the communist countries and the west. More specifically the USSR and the United States. The reasoning behind the war from the United States perspective is deeply rooted in being against communism, “To the United States and its allies, communism represented a threat to free trade, free elections, and individual freedoms. This threat was heightened by the increased number of nuclear weapons.”. The distinction between communism and the democratic west was marked by the split of Germany, Czechoslovakia, and Austria. The USSR tried to block the western forces access to West Berlin resulting in the Berlin Airlife of 1948. The United States used aid as an effort of diplomacy actively working against communism. The USSR did not only spread communism throughout Europe, but also into nations such as Cuba. This was very concerning for the United States efforts to contain communism due to the close distance between Cuba and the US. Communism was also spreading in Vietnam. This led to a proxy war between the USSR and US, as the USSR backed the North Vietnam communist side and the US backed the South Vietnam forces. The fall of the Berlin Wall marked the reunification of Germany and is typically viewed as the ending of the Cold War. At this time, Mikhail Gorbachev was the president of the USSR. November 10th, 1989, “hundreds of Berliners climbed on top of the Berlin Wall at Brandenburg Gate in Berlin, demanding in a peaceful protest that the wall be pulled down. When the Berlin Wall fell, the Soviet Union stepped back, letting East Germany’s communist government collapse and quickly accepting German unification.”. This was possible because of some of Gorbachev’s policies such as Glasnost (a policy of openness). Gorbachev’s hold on other Eastern European countries also began to loosen, and communism began to fall across the world.

== Collapse of the Soviet Union ==
Authors Roger Keeran and Thomas Kenney stipulate that the primary cause of the Soviet Union's collapse was a betrayal of established socialist principles, particularly during the Gorbachev era. Gorbachev's policies of perestroika and glasnost undermined the planned economy, weakening the Communist Party and allowing non-communist power to take hold. This is catalyzed in Gorbachev's removal of the Communist Party's constitutional role in 1990. A year later, the USSR was dissolved despite a majority of the Soviet citizens voting against dissolution. Boris Yeltsin then became the first president of Russia. Russian president Boris Yeltsin would ban the CPSU in the aftermath of the failed coup attempt. The Communist Party of the Russian Federation(CPRF) would be founded at the Second Extraordinary Congress of Russian Communists on 14 February 1993 as the successor organization of the Communist Party of the Russian Soviet Federative Socialist Republic (CPRSFSR). The CPRF was the ruling party in the State Duma, the lower house of the Russian Federal Assembly from 1998 to 1999. It is the second-largest political party in Russia after United Russia.

== Modern Russia ==
Soviet nostalgia remains prevalent among the Russian populace. Per the Levada Center in 2018, 66 percent of Russians said they regretted the Soviet break-up highlighting the enduring impact of this historical period on the collective memory of the nation.

== Organizations ==
- All-Union Communist Party (Bolsheviks) (1995)
- All-Union Communist Party of Bolsheviks (1991)
- Communist Party of the Russian Federation
- Communist Party of the Russian Soviet Federative Socialist Republic
- Communist Party of the Soviet Union
- Communist Party of the Soviet Union (2001)
- Communist Party of Social Justice
- Communists of Russia
- Essence of Time
- Labour Russia
- League of Struggle for the Emancipation of the Working Class
- Left Front
- Leninist Komsomol of the Russian Federation
- Party of Narodnik Communists
- Party of Revolutionary Communism
- Party of the Dictatorship of the Proletariat
- Revolutionary Workers' Party
- Russian Communist Workers Party
- Russian Communist Workers' Party of the Communist Party of the Soviet Union
- Russian Maoist Party
- Russian Socialist Movement
- Russian United Labour Front
- Socialist Alternative
- Socialist League Vpered
- Stalin Bloc – For the USSR
- Union of Communist Parties – Communist Party of the Soviet Union
- United Communist Party
- Vanguard of Red Youth

== See also ==
- Anarchism in Russia
- Bolshevism
- Ideology of the Communist Party of the Soviet Union
- Leninism
- New Soviet man
- Nostalgia for the Soviet Union
- Russian Soviet Federative Socialist Republic
- Sovietization
