= All-Union Communist Party =

All-Union Communist Party or AUCP may refer to the following political parties:

- All-Union Communist Party (bolsheviks) (AUCP(b)), a former name of the Communist Party of the Soviet Union
- All-Union Communist Party of Bolsheviks (1991) (AUCPB), a small party established in 1991 and operating in the former Soviet Union
- All-Union Communist Party (Bolsheviks) (1995) (AUCP(B)), established in 1995
