= Stalinobus =

Bus with Stalin's portrait

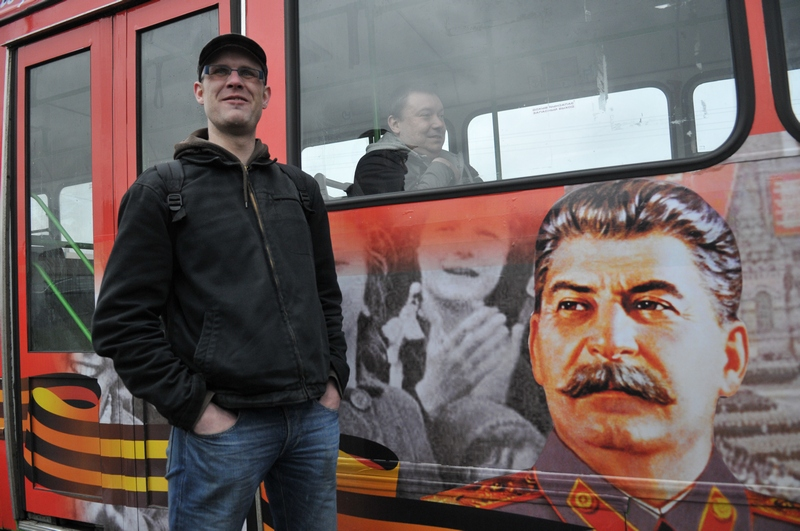
The first Stalinobus in St. Petersburg, 2010

Stalinobus or Stalinbus (Russian: Сталинобус) was a public campaign held from 2010 to 2013 in several cities across Russia and the CIS. It involved placing images of Joseph Stalin on public transportation vehicles (buses and marshrutkas). It was primarily held around the celebration of the Victory Day (9 May). It was initiated by a Russian blogger Viktor Loginov. The glorification of the Soviet dictator was met with criticism. Still, many Russians admire Stalin.

== See also ==
- Nostalgia for the Soviet Union
- Neo-Sovietism
