= AUCP =

AUCP may refer to:

- All-Union Communist Party (disambiguation)
- American University in Cairo Press
