= Bolshevik Platform of the CPSU =

Bolshevik Platform of the CPSU Bol'shevistskaya platforma v KPSS
- Leader: Tatyana Mihailovna Khabarova
- Founded: July 13, 1991
- Legalised: Not officially registered
- Dissolved: November 8, 1991
- Succeeded by: All-Union Communist Party of Bolsheviks
- Ideology: Communism; Marxism–Leninism; Stalinism
- Political position: Far-left

Website
- cccp-kpss.narod.ru/bpk/bpl.htm

The Bolshevik Platform of the CPSU (in Russian: Большевистская платформа в КПСС) is a communist political association on the territory of the former Soviet Union. It was founded on July 13, 1991 on the Initiative of the association Unity - for Leninism and the Communist Ideals that had been set up in 1988 in opposition to the politics of the Communist Party of the Soviet Union (CPSU) under the leadership of Mikhail Gorbachev. Unity and the Platform were led by Nina Andreyeva.

When the CPSU was banned in 1991 the majority of the Platform favoured the creation of a new party. In November 1991 Andreeva and Andrei Lapin founded the All-Union Communist Party of Bolsheviks (AUCPB) and Sergei Gubanov the Worker-Peasant Socialist Party. A Minority under the leadership of the president of the Ideological Commission Tatyana Khabarova who did not recognize the dissolution of the CPSU stayed in the Platform.

The Platform supported different efforts to reestablish the CPSU and became part of the Union of Communist Parties – Communist Party of the Soviet Union UCP-CPSU) founded in 1993 as successor of the CPSU. The Platform left the UCP-CPSU however in 1995 because of growing disagreement about its political orientation. The Bolshevik Platform created the Movement of Citizens of the USSR in 1993 which organized the Movement For the Soviet Union with the aim of founding a Congress of the Citizens of the USSR. It took place in October 1995 open to all former citizens of the USSR.

The Bolshevik Platform fought against "revisionism" in the CPSU. It considers the other communist parties in the post-Soviet states as rightwingers. It wants the immediate restoration of the Soviet Union and the CPSU and is opposed to work in the institutions of the state. The Platform does not take part in elections.

The Bolshevik Platform published Svetoch (Torch).
