= Nostalgia for the Soviet Union =

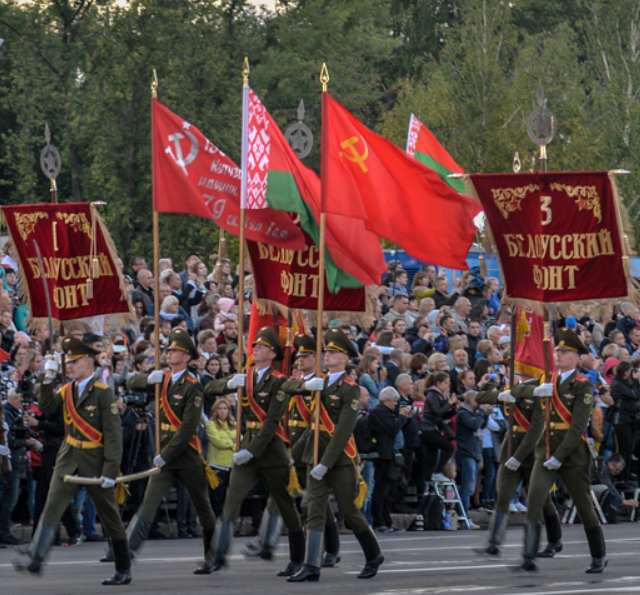
Belarusian Honor Guard carrying the national flags of Belarus and the Soviet Union, as well as the Soviet victory banner, during the Minsk Independence Day Parade, 2019.

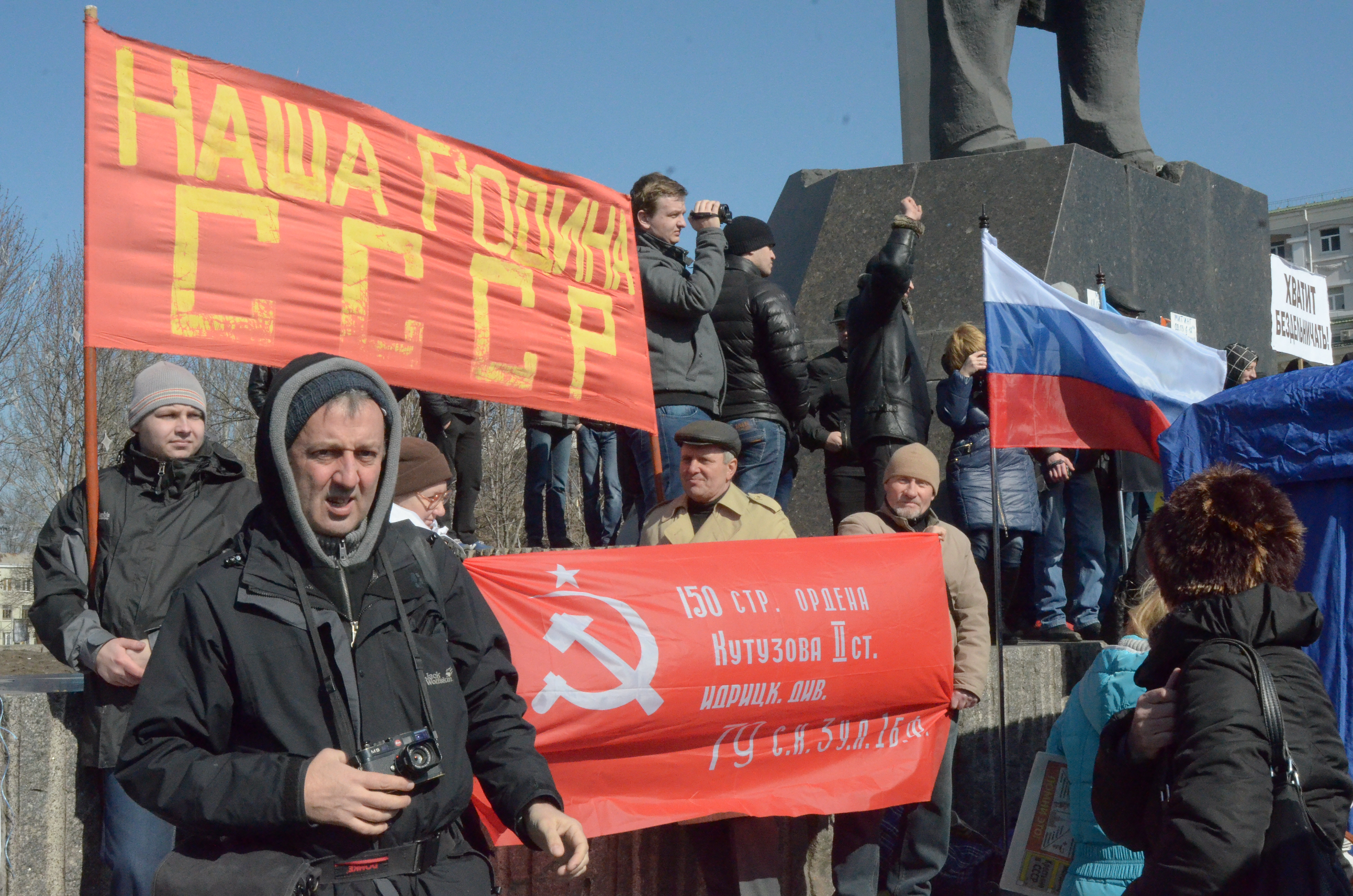
Protest against Ukrainian decommunization policies in Donetsk, 2014. The red banner reads, "Our homeland is the USSR".

The social phenomenon of nostalgia for the Soviet Union (Russian: Ностальгия по СССР, romanized: Nostal'giya po SSSR) can include sentimental attitudes towards its politics, society, culture and cultural artifacts, superpower status, or simply aesthetics.

Modern cultural expressions of Soviet nostalgia also emphasize the former Soviet Union's scientific and technological achievements, particularly during the Space Age, and value the Soviet past for its futuristic aspirations.

An analysis by the Harvard Political Review found that sociological explanations for Soviet nostalgia vary from "reminiscing about the USSR's global superpower status" to the "loss of financial, political and social stability" which accompanied the Soviet dissolution in many post-Soviet states.

== Polling history ==
=== Armenia ===
A 2013 Gallup survey showed that 66% of Armenians thought the dissolution of the USSR was harmful, the highest of any country surveyed, compared to 12% who thought it was beneficial. A 2016 survey showed that 71% of Armenians believed life was better under the USSR. Regret about dissolution later increased to 79% according to a 2017 Pew survey, compared to just 15% saying dissolution was a good thing.

=== Azerbaijan ===
A 2013 Gallup survey showed that 31% of Azerbaijanis thought the dissolution of the USSR was harmful, compared to 44% who thought it was beneficial. In a 2016 survey, 69% of Azerbaijanis believed life was better under the USSR.

=== Belarus ===
In a 1998 survey, Belarusians were the 2nd-most favorable, behind just Ukraine, towards the communist economic system at 78%. However by 2006, only 39% of Belarusians agreed that "It is a great misfortune that the USSR no longer exists", compared to 49% who did not agree. In addition, compared to Russians and Ukrainians, Belarusians were the most favorable towards the current system at 35% preferring it as the most suitable political system. Combined with those who supported Western democracy (22%) gets a total of 57%, compared to 28% who support a Soviet-based system (20% supporting a democratized Soviet system, 8% supporting a pre-perestroika Soviet system). Furthermore, 43% of Belarusians supported a market economy compared to 27% who supported a Soviet-style planned economy, and 49% said Belarus should follow its own unique path of development (followed by 40% saying it should follow the path of Europe, and 5% saying it should follow the path the USSR was taking). A majority of Belarusians (55%) supported closer cooperation within the Commonwealth of Independent States instead of a full union (16%).

However by 2013, a Gallup survey showed that 38% of Belarusians thought the dissolution of the USSR was harmful, compared to just 26% who thought it was beneficial. In a 2016 survey, it increased to 53% of Belarusians saying life was better under the USSR. Regret about dissolution later increased again slightly to 54%, compared to 34% saying dissolution was a good thing according to a 2017 Pew survey.

=== Estonia ===
In a 2017 survey, 75% of Estonians said the dissolution of the USSR was a good thing, compared to only 15% who said it was a bad thing.

=== Georgia ===
A 2013 Gallup survey showed that 33% of Georgians thought the dissolution of the USSR was harmful, compared to 37% who thought it was beneficial. Later, a 2017 survey showed that 47% of Georgians thought the dissolution was a good thing, compared to 38% who thought it was a bad thing. Another Pew survey, also in 2017, showed that 43% of Georgians thought the dissolution was a good thing, compared to 42% who thought it was a bad thing.

=== Kazakhstan ===
In 2005, a survey showed that 49.7% of Kazakhs "strongly agreed or agreed" that the Soviet government responded to the citizens' needs, compared to only 9.1% saying the current Kazakh government responded to citizens' needs. However, a 2013 Gallup survey showed that 25% of Kazakhs thought the dissolution of the USSR was harmful, compared to 45% who thought it was beneficial. In a 2016 survey, around 60% of Kazakhs above the age of 35 believed life was better under the USSR.

=== Kyrgyzstan ===
In 2005, a survey showed that 70.3% of Kyrgyz "strongly agreed or agreed" that the Soviet government responded to citizens' needs, compared to only 16.9% saying the same about the current Kyrgyz government. A 2013 Gallup survey showed that 61% of Kyrgyz thought the dissolution of the USSR was harmful, compared to 16% who thought it was beneficial.

=== Latvia ===
In a 2017 Pew survey, 30% of Latvians said the dissolution of the USSR was a bad thing, while 53% said it was a good thing.

=== Lithuania ===
In 2017, Pew survey showed that 62% of Lithuanians believed the dissolution of the USSR was a good thing, compared to 23% who said it was a bad thing. In 2019, another Pew survey showed that in 1991 only 13% of Lithuanians rated their life as "good", while in 2019 that number was 44%. Additionally, according to the 2019 survey, 60% of Lithuanians stated that the economic situation in the country is "good" and 61% believed that their children will be better off financially compared to the parents. Similarly, 69% approved the change to multi-party system and 70% approved the change to market economy.

=== Moldova ===
A 2013 Gallup survey showed that 42% of Moldovans thought the dissolution of the USSR was harmful, compared to 26% who thought it was beneficial. Regret about dissolution later increased to 70% according to a 2017 Pew survey, with only 18% saying the dissolution was a good thing.

=== Russia ===
In a 2005 survey, 66% of Russians said they agreed "It is a great misfortune that the USSR no longer exists", while only 30% disagreed. In addition, 57% supported some form of Soviet-based system as their preferred political system (35% supporting a democratized Soviet system, 22% supporting a pre-perestroika system), compared to 32% who supported a non-Soviet system (17% supporting the current system, 15% supporting Western democracy). An equal percentage of Russians (34%) supported a market economy or a Soviet-style planned economy. However, 59% supported Russia going on its own unique path of development, as opposed to following the path of the USSR (11%) or Europe (25%). A plurality of Russians supported uniting the CiS (39%), higher than those supporting just closer cooperation (37%) and the same amount of cooperation (10%).

Polling data from the Levada Center since 1992 shows consistent rates of regret for the dissolution of the Soviet Union, with the most recent poll in 2021 finding that 63% of Russians regret the dissolution, with only 28% saying they do not regret its dissolution. Regret was lowest in 2012, when only 49% of Russians said they regretted the dissolution. However, this was still higher than the percentage not regretting it of 36%. The most common reasons listed for regret are the end of the unified economic system, and them no longer being citizens of a superpower.

Levada polling since the mid-1990s on the preferred political and economic system of Russians also shows nostalgia for the Soviet Union, with the most recent polling in 2021 showing 49% preferring the Soviet political system, compared to 18% preferring the current system, and 16% preferring Western democracy, as well as 62% saying they preferred a system of economic planning compared to 24% preferring a market capitalist economy.

In a 2020 Levada Center survey, 75% of Russians agreed that the Soviet era was the "greatest time" in the history of Russia.

Date	% regretting the dissolution	% not regretting the dissolution	Source
March 1992	66%	23%	
March 1993	63%	23%	
August 1994	66%	19%	
March 1999	74%	16%	
December 2000	75%	19%	
December 2001	72%	21%	
December 2002	68%	25%	
December 2004	68%	26%	
November 2005	65%	25%	
November 2006	61%	30%	
November 2007	55%	36%	
November 2008	60%	30%	
November 2009	60%	28%	
November 2010	55%	30%	
November 2011	53%	32%	
December 2012	49%	36%	
December 2013	57%	30%	
November 2014	54%	28%	
November 2015	54%	37%	
March 2016	56%	28%	
November 2016	56%	28%	
November 2017	58%	26%	
November 2018	66%	25%	
November 2020	65%	26%	
November 2021	63%	28%	

=== Tajikistan ===
A 2013 Gallup survey showed that 52% of Tajiks thought the dissolution of the USSR was harmful, compared to 27% who thought it was beneficial. By 2016, only 39% of Tajiks had believed life under the USSR was better.

=== Turkmenistan ===
A 2013 Gallup survey showed that only 8% of Turkmen thought the dissolution of the USSR was harmful, the lowest of any country surveyed, compared to 62% who thought it was beneficial.

=== Ukraine ===
In a 1998 survey, Ukraine had the highest approval out of any former communist state for the communist economic system at 90%. Ukraine also had the highest approval of the communist government system at 82%, the highest approval of communism as an ideology at 59%, and the highest support for a communist restoration at 51%.

However, gradually Ukraine would start to have less favorable views on its Soviet past. In a 2006 survey, only 42% of Ukrainians agreed that "It is a great misfortune that the USSR no longer exists" compared to 49% who disagreed. However, when asked their preferred political system, 46% of respondents preferred some form of Soviet system (31% supporting a democratized version, 16% supporting a pre-perestroika version) compared to 42% who supported a non-Soviet system (18% supporting the current system, 24% supporting a Western democracy). 44% supported a market economy compared to 25% who supported a Soviet-style planned economy. 49% of Ukrainians also stated that Ukraine should follow its own unique way of development, rather than follow the path of Europe (31%) or the path the USSR was taking (13%). 52% supported closer cooperation with the CiS rather than a full union (17%).

In a 2009 Pew survey, 62% of Ukrainians said life was worse economically nowadays compared to the Soviet era. A 2013 Gallup survey showed that 56% of Ukrainians thought the dissolution of the USSR was harmful, while only 23% thought it was beneficial. In a 2016 survey, 60% of Ukrainians above the age of 35 said life was better under the USSR. However, by 2020, a survey from the Kyiv International Institute of Sociology showed that 34% of Ukrainians regretted the dissolution of the USSR, compared to 50% who do not regret it. Regret was highest in Eastern Ukraine where 49% of Ukrainians regretted it compared to 35% who did not, while it was lowest in Western Ukraine where only 15% regretted it compared to 69% who did not.

Attitudes toward the Soviet past changed substantially after Russia’s full-scale invasion in 2022. A September–October 2022 poll by the Razumkov Center found that nearly 90% of Ukrainians did not want to restore the USSR. Another survey in 2022 found that only 11% of respondents said they missed the Soviet Union, while 87% said they did not. Later polling also indicated a strong shift toward Ukrainian national identity, with only 2% of Ukrainians identifying primarily with the USSR in 2024.

=== Uzbekistan ===
In 2005, a survey showed that 48.1% of Uzbeks said the Soviet government responded to citizens' needs, compared to 28.1% saying the same about the current government. However, in 2016, only 4% of Uzbeks believed life was better under the USSR.

== Sociology and economics ==
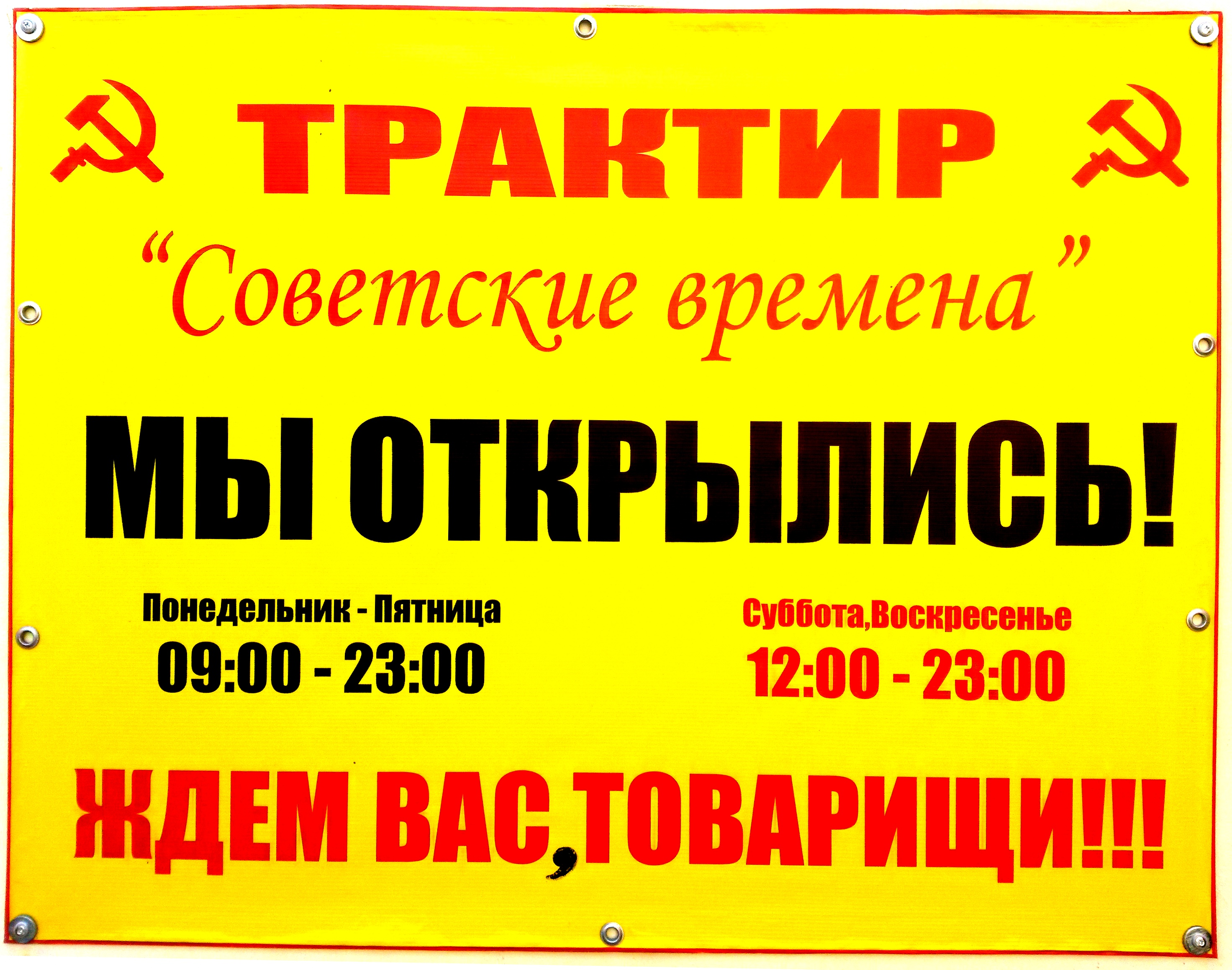
Wall advertisement at the "Soviet Times" pub in Moscow

According to the Levada Center's polls, the primary reasons cited for Soviet nostalgia are the advantages of the shared economic union between the Soviet republics, including perceived financial stability. This was referenced by up to 53% of respondents in 2016. At least 43% also lamented the loss of the Soviet Union's global political superpower status. About 31% cited the loss of social trust and capital. The remainder of the respondents cited a mix of reasons ranging from practical travel difficulties to a sense of national displacement. A 2019 poll found that 59% of Russians felt that the Soviet government "took care of ordinary people". When asked to name positive associations with the Soviet Union in 2020, 16% of the Levada Center's respondents pointed to "future stability and confidence", 15% said they associated it with "a good life in the country", and 11% said they associated it with personal memories from their childhood or youth.

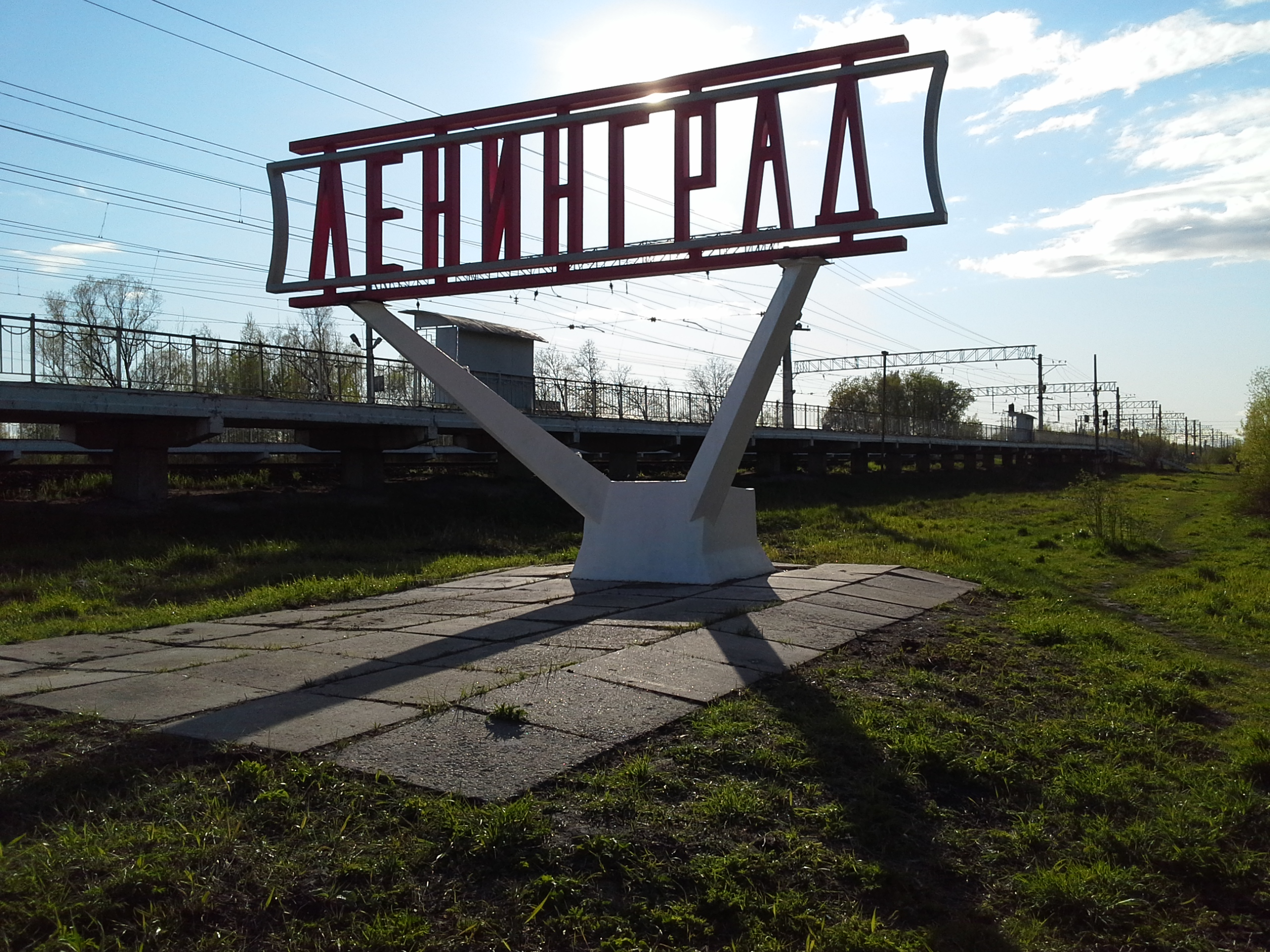
LENINGRAD sign at the Izhory station on the outskirts of Saint Petersburg. The sign was restored in 2020.

Levada Center sociologist Karina Pipiya observed that the economic factors played the most significant role in rising nostalgia for the Soviet Union, as opposed to loss of prestige or national identity. Pipiya also suggested a secondary factor was that a majority of Russians "regret that there used to be more social justice and that the government worked for the people and that it was better in terms of care for citizens and paternalistic expectations."

In 2022, Oxford University professors Paul Chaisty and Stephen Whitefield carried out an analysis of polling data which studied continued identification with the Soviet Union among adult Russian citizens. Chaisty and Whitefield noted that those who identified most with the Soviet Union were likely to be elderly and less affluent. Contributing factors included "nostalgia for Soviet era economic and welfare policies as well as a cultural nostalgia for a particular Soviet 'way of life' and traditional values." Other common reasons Russians cited nostalgia for the Soviet Union included hostility towards Western countries, hostility towards capitalism and the market economy, and a desire to re-assert Russian military and political ascendancy over the former Soviet space.

Gallup observed in its data review that "For many, life has not been easy since the Soviet Union dissolved in December 1991. Residents there have lived through wars, revolutions, coups, territorial disputes, and multiple economic collapses...Older residents...whose safety nets, such as guaranteed pensions and free healthcare, largely disappeared when the union dissolved are more likely to say the breakup harmed their countries."

In her examination of identities in post-Soviet Ukraine, historian Catherine Wanner concurs that the loss or reduction of social benefits has played a major role in Soviet nostalgia among older residents. Describing elderly female pensioners who expressed nostalgia for the Soviet era, Wanner writes:

They had relied all their lives on the ruling [Communist] Party structure and hierarchy...and with it now absent, they have no recourse of their own...to stave off hardship. As meager as pensions and salaries are, they become indispensable when they are the sole source of income. Once again, these women do not have the networks and the contacts to overcome logistical obstacles to securing alternative employment. Without the protection of the Soviet state and its roster of cradle-to-grave allotments, in this new social Darwinian post-Soviet world without vital blat connections they are left highly vulnerable to poverty. They blame their incomprehensible woes and the elusiveness of a solution on the breakdown of the Soviet state. They recognize that recreating the Soviet Union and the economic and political systems that characterized it is an option that exists only in their dreams. But it is one that exerts tremendous nostalgic appeal.

An analysis of Soviet nostalgia in the Harvard Political Review found that "the rapid transition from a Soviet-type planned economy to neoliberal capitalism has imposed a high financial burden on the population of these fifteen newly independent post-Soviet states. This period brought a sharp decline of living standards, a reduction in social benefits, and a rise in unemployment and poverty rates. The frustration of ordinary citizens only grew, as they witnessed the creation of an oligarchic elite that was getting richer while everyone else was becoming poorer. Under these circumstances, nostalgia for the Soviet Union is a direct consequence of people's disappointment with their countries’ political and economic performance." The following joke illustrates this reason of communist nostalgia: Q: What did capitalism accomplish in one year that communism could not do in seventy years? A: Made communism look good.

While not dismissing explanatory models that emphasize socio-economic factors, the sociologist David Leupold has highlighted the role that collapsing horizons of future expectation in the post-socialist period play in shaping how people retrospectively make sense of state socialism. Leupold stressed in this context in particular the role of the built-environment which induces in residents across the post-Soviet space a sense of inhabiting cities built for a future that did not arrive. In this context, post-Soviet nostalgia must be treated as a distinct form of collective sentiment different from other forms of post-imperial nostalgia (Neo-Ottomanism, nostalgia for the Habsburg or Romanov Empire) in the sense that it contains a future-oriented aspect that transcends the historical experience with state socialism. As a result, Soviet-era materiality does not only instill a passive sense of nostalgia but may likewise form "the material nexus around which narratives of resistance and social change could crystallize".

British journalist Anatol Lieven linked the phenomenon of Soviet nostalgia directly to the age structure of populations in the former Soviet republics. Lieven wrote in 1998 that nostalgia often "takes the form of a deep yearning for stability and order, which is exactly what one would expect from an elderly population. It is in terms of a nostalgia for this past security, rather than a desire for national conquests, power, and glory, that Soviet restorationist feeling in Russia should mainly be seen." He also added that "Soviet nostalgia is likely to diminish as the older generation dies off and the age structure of society assumes a less top-heavy form." Lieven claimed that economic and physical insecurity were the primary drivers of Soviet nostalgia among the elderly, since many believed that "in Soviet days they lived better and more securely", with less crime, ethnic strife, or unemployment. However, he also observed in his research of polling data that there was little enthusiasm for Soviet nostalgia among post-Soviet youth in the late 1990s, and younger people were more drawn to various strains of post-Soviet nationalism in their respective countries. Ekaterina Kalinina, a researcher on post-Soviet culture and media at the University of Copenhagen, concurred with other findings that Soviet nostalgia is driven primarily by the collapse of the former regime's welfare state. Kalinina pointed out that Soviet nostalgia had the greatest appeal to those "who find themselves in more vulnerable economic and social positions" in the post-Soviet era. Per Kalinina, these individuals are nostalgic for "economic security and social welfare."

Many of the ex-Soviet republics suffered economic collapse upon the dissolution, resulting in lowered living standards, increased mortality rates, devaluation of national currencies, and rising income inequality. Chaotic neoliberal market reforms, privatization, and austerity measures urged by Western economic advisers, including Lawrence Summers, and the International Monetary Fund (IMF) were often blamed by the populace of the former Soviet states for exacerbating the problem. Between 1991 and 1994, a third of Russia's population was plunged into poverty, and between 1994 and 1998 this figure increased to over half the population. Most of the Soviet state enterprises were acquired and liquidated by Russian business oligarchs as part of the privatization campaign, which rendered large segments of the ex-Soviet workforce unemployed and impoverished. Capital gains made in post-Soviet Russia during the 1990s were mostly concentrated in the hands of oligarchs who benefited from the acquisition of state assets, while the majority of the population suffered severe economic hardship.

According to Kristen Ghodsee, a researcher on post-communist Eastern Europe:

Only by examining how the quotidian aspects of daily life were affected by great social, political and economic changes can we make sense of the desire for this collectively imagined, more egalitarian past. Nobody wants to revive 20th century totalitarianism. But nostalgia for communism has become a common language through which ordinary men and women express disappointment with the shortcomings of parliamentary democracy and neoliberal capitalism today.

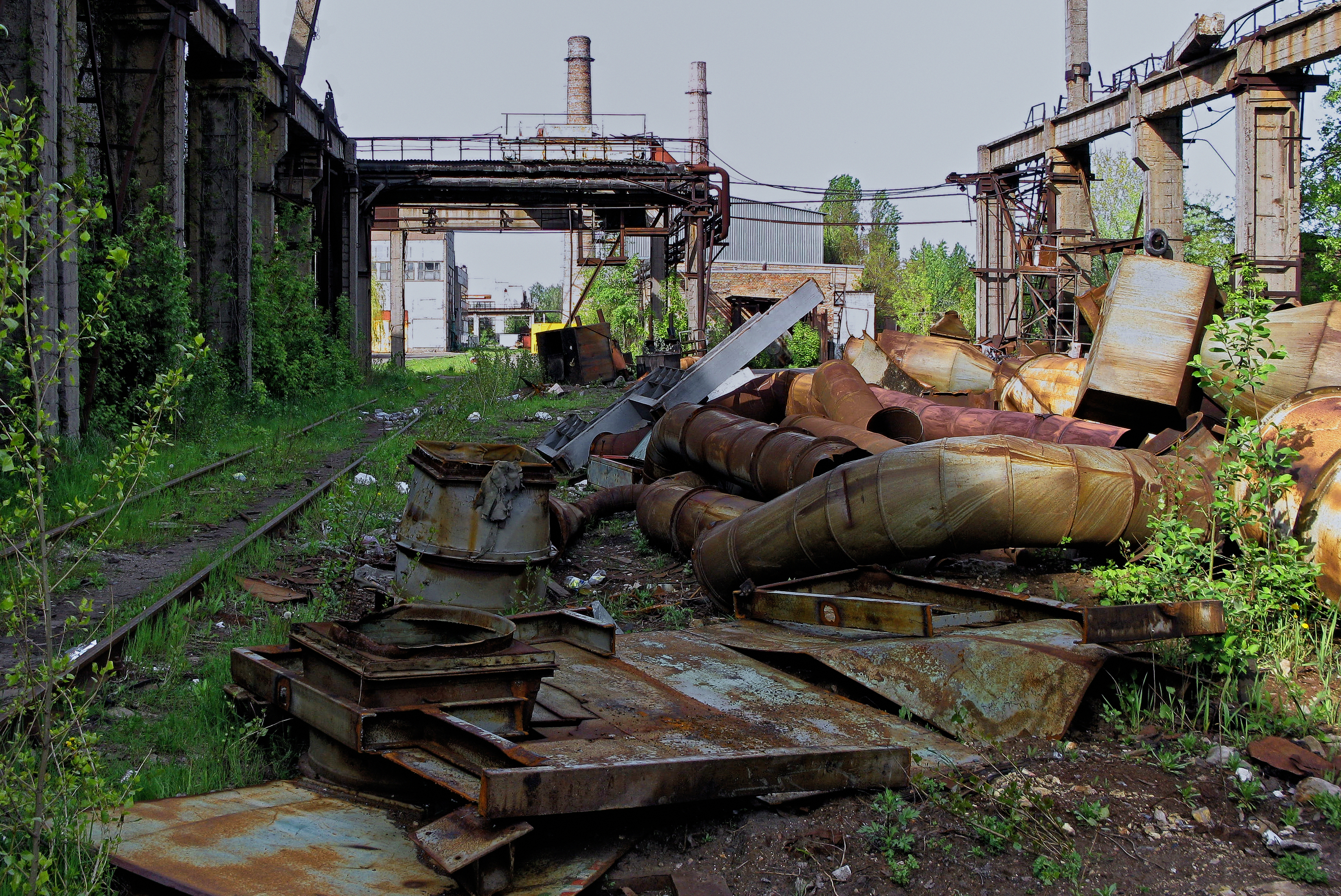
Abandoned Soviet factory in Kyiv. The USSR's collapse was accompanied by deindustrialization and mass unemployment, feeding Soviet nostalgia in the working class.

Among the working poor, Soviet nostalgia is often directly linked to the guarantee of state employment and regular salaries. The collapse of Soviet state enterprises and contraction of the public sector after the dissolution resulted in widespread unemployment. With the disappearance of the Soviet industrial complex, as much as half the working class of the former USSR lost their jobs during the 1990s. One study of rural Georgians in the early 2000s found that the vast majority yearned for a return to the security of their public sector jobs, even those that did not favor a return to the centrally planned economy. They attributed their poverty to the demise of the Soviet state, which in turn resulted in the widespread association of stability with the Soviet era and lack of confidence in the post-Soviet governments. A related study of working class Kyrgyz women in the same time frame found that most remembered the Soviet era primarily for its low levels of unemployment.

Security historian Matthew Sussex wrote the 1990s were a period of "social and economic malaise experienced across the former USSR". Upon the Soviet dissolution, "rampant inflation within many newly independent states quickly became coupled to the rise of financial oligarchs...[while] uneven transitions to democracy and the institutionalization of organized crime became the norm." Furthermore, Sussex surmised, the post-Soviet space became politically unstable and prone to armed conflict as a result of the dissolution. With the collapse of the Soviet military and security organs, a security vacuum emerged which was quickly filled by extremist political and religious factions as well as organized crime, further exacerbated by tensions between the various post-Soviet states over the ownership of the defunct USSR's energy infrastructure. Sussex claimed that "during its existence the USSR enforced order upon what are today recognized as numerous ethnic, religious, and geostrategic trouble spots," and "although few observers lament the passing of the USSR, even fewer would argue that the area of its former geographical footprint is more secure today than it was under communism." In Armenia, where the dissolution was followed by the Nagorno-Karabakh conflict with neighboring Azerbaijan, Soviet nostalgia was closely tied to a longing for a return to peace and public order.

In a 2020 editorial, Russian-born American journalist Andre Vltchek suggested that Soviet nostalgia may also be closely tied to aspects of Soviet society and public life—for example, he claimed the Soviet Union had an extensive public works program, heavily subsidized public facilities and transportation, high levels of civic engagement, and support for the arts. Without state subsidies and central planning, Vltchek insisted that these aspects of society disappeared or became severely diminished in the post-Soviet space. Vltchek lamented the apparent loss or decay of Soviet-era public amenities and cultural spaces which followed the dissolution.

Anthropologist Alexei Yurchak described modern Soviet nostalgia as "a complex post-Soviet construct" based on the "longing for the very real humane values, ethics, friendships, and creative possibilities that the reality of socialism afforded – often in spite of the state's proclaimed goals – and that were as irreducibly part of the everyday life of socialism as were the feelings of dullness and alienation." Yurchak observed that localized community bonds and social capital were much stronger during the Soviet era due to various practical realities, and theorized that this was an "undeniable constitutive part" of nostalgia as expressed by the last Soviet generation.

== Cultural impact ==
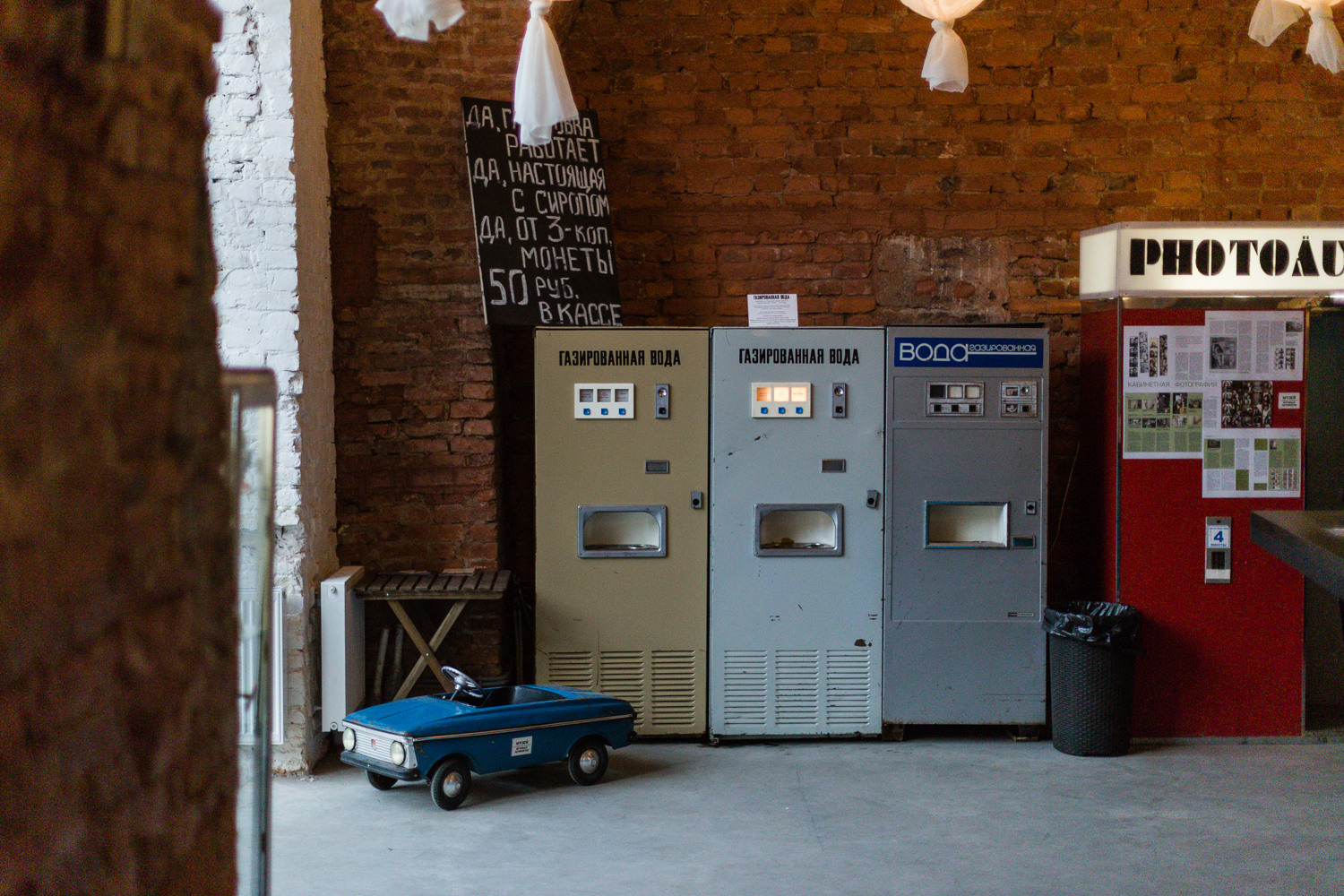
Vending machines and a photo kiosk from the Soviet era in the Museum of Soviet Arcade Machines.

=== Aesthetics ===
According to Ukrainian journalist Oksana Forostyna, positive cultural depictions of Soviet life emphasizing its modernization and progressivism were common until the late 1980s. This cultural narrative was largely abandoned during perestroika. However, Forostyna observes that it returned to the post-Soviet space during the late 2000s, resulting in a new "glamorization of Soviet aesthetics". Among many young Russians who could not remember the Soviet era, this manifested as an interest in Soviet cultural artifacts, such as art, clothing, designs, and memorabilia. Soviet Space Age imagery and art experienced a major resurgence in particular due to nostalgia for that era's perceived optimism and utopian speculations.

In 2007, the Museum of Soviet Arcade Machines was established to recreate the experience of Soviet arcades and early gaming culture for visitors.

In 2019, virtual reality tours of Moscow began to be offered which recreated the aesthetics and architecture of the city during the Soviet era.

=== Soviet holidays ===
During the 1990s, most key holidays linked to the national and ideological charter of the Soviet Union were eliminated in the former Soviet republics, with the exception of Victory Day, which commemorates the Soviet Union's victory over Nazi Germany in World War II (also known in the Soviet and Russian space as the Great Patriotic War). The commemorations of Victory Day have not changed radically in most of the post-Soviet space since 1991. Catherine Wanner asserts that Victory Day commemorations are a vehicle for Soviet nostalgia, as they "kept alive a mythology of Soviet grandeur, of solidarity among the Sovietskii narod, and of a sense of self as citizen of a superpower state".

Russian Victory Day parades are organized annually in most cities, with the central military parade taking place in Moscow (just as during the Soviet times). Additionally, the recently introduced Immortal Regiment on 9 May sees millions of Russians carry the portraits of their relatives who fought in the war. Russia also retains other Soviet holidays, such as the Defender of the Fatherland Day (23 February), International Women's Day (8 March), and International Workers' Day.

=== Sports ===
During the 2019 Euro Hockey Tour's Channel One Cup, the Russia men's national ice hockey team competed in the uniforms of the old Soviet men's national ice hockey team. A spokesperson for the team stated that these were specifically adopted to commemorate the 75th anniversary of organized ice hockey sports in Russia. In support of the team's gesture, many of the Russian spectators present at the Channel One Cup that year displayed Soviet national flags.

=== Media ===
In 2004, a cable station devoted to the music, culture, and arts of the Soviet Union, known as Nostalgiya, was launched in Russia. Aside from Soviet era TV shows and movies, Nostalgiya also broadcasts a panel show, "Before and After", in which guests discuss various historical events from Soviet history.

== Political impact ==
=== Neo-Soviet politics ===
Writing in the Harvard Political Review, analyst Mihaela Esanu stated that Soviet nostalgia has contributed to a revival in neo-Soviet politics. Yearning for the Soviet past in various post-Soviet republics, Esanu argued, has contributed greatly to the rise of neo-Soviet political factions committed to increasing economic, military, and political ties with Russia, the historic center of the power in the USSR, as opposed to the West. Esanu argued that appeals to Soviet nostalgia are especially prominent with pro-Russian parties in Belarus and Moldova.

Journalist Pamela Druckerman asserts that another aspect of neo-Sovietism is support for the central role of the state in civil society, political life, and the media. Druckerman claimed that neo-Soviet policies resulted in a return to statist philosophy in the Russian government.

=== Communist Party of the Russian Federation ===
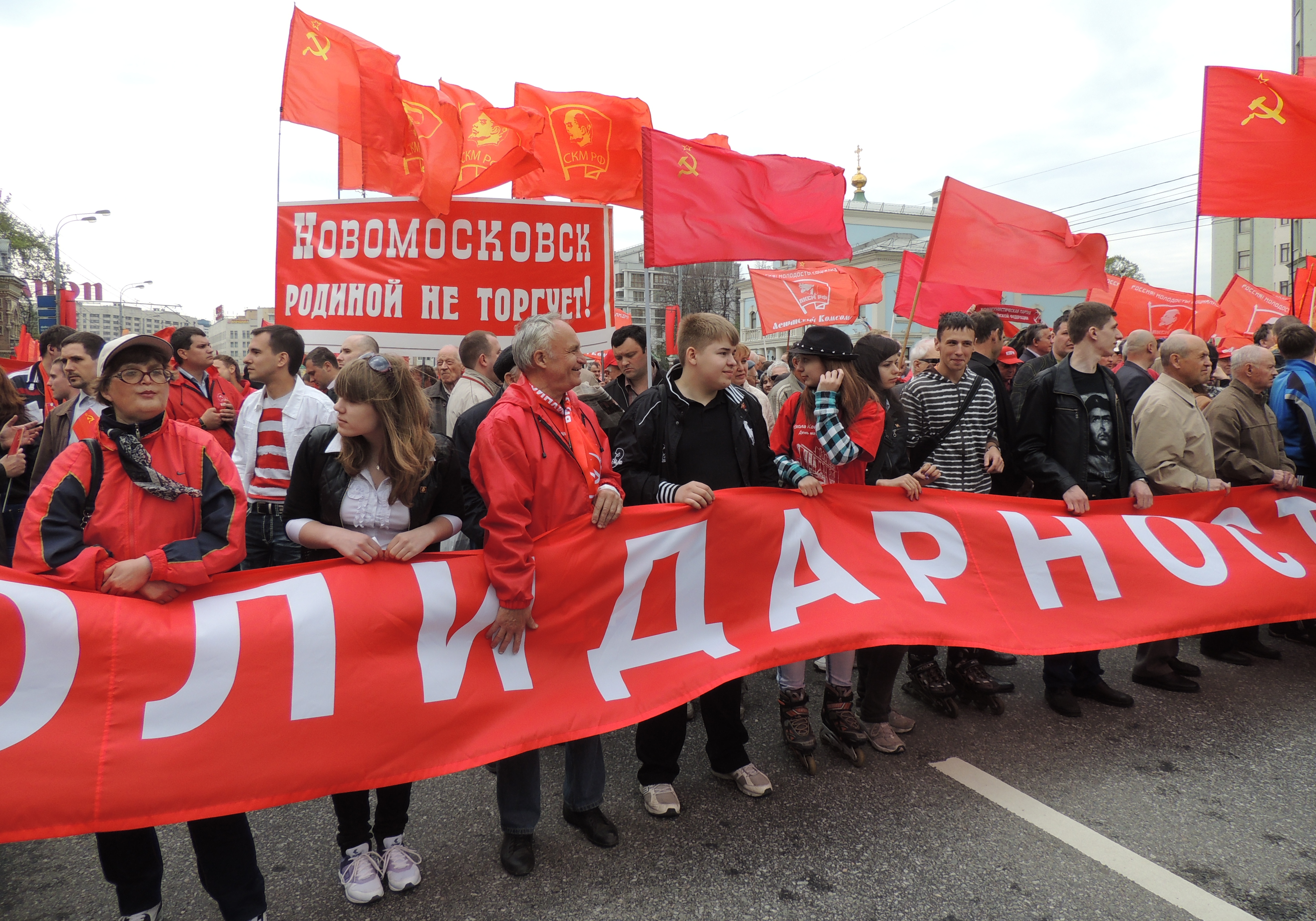
Supporters of the Russian Communist Party demonstrate in Moscow, 2012.

Gennady Zyuganov, leader of the Communist Party of the Russian Federation, is a harsh critic of President Vladimir Putin, but states that his recipes for Russia's future are true to his Soviet roots. Zyuganov hopes to renationalise all major industries and he believes the USSR was "the most humane state in human history".

=== Russo-Ukrainian War ===
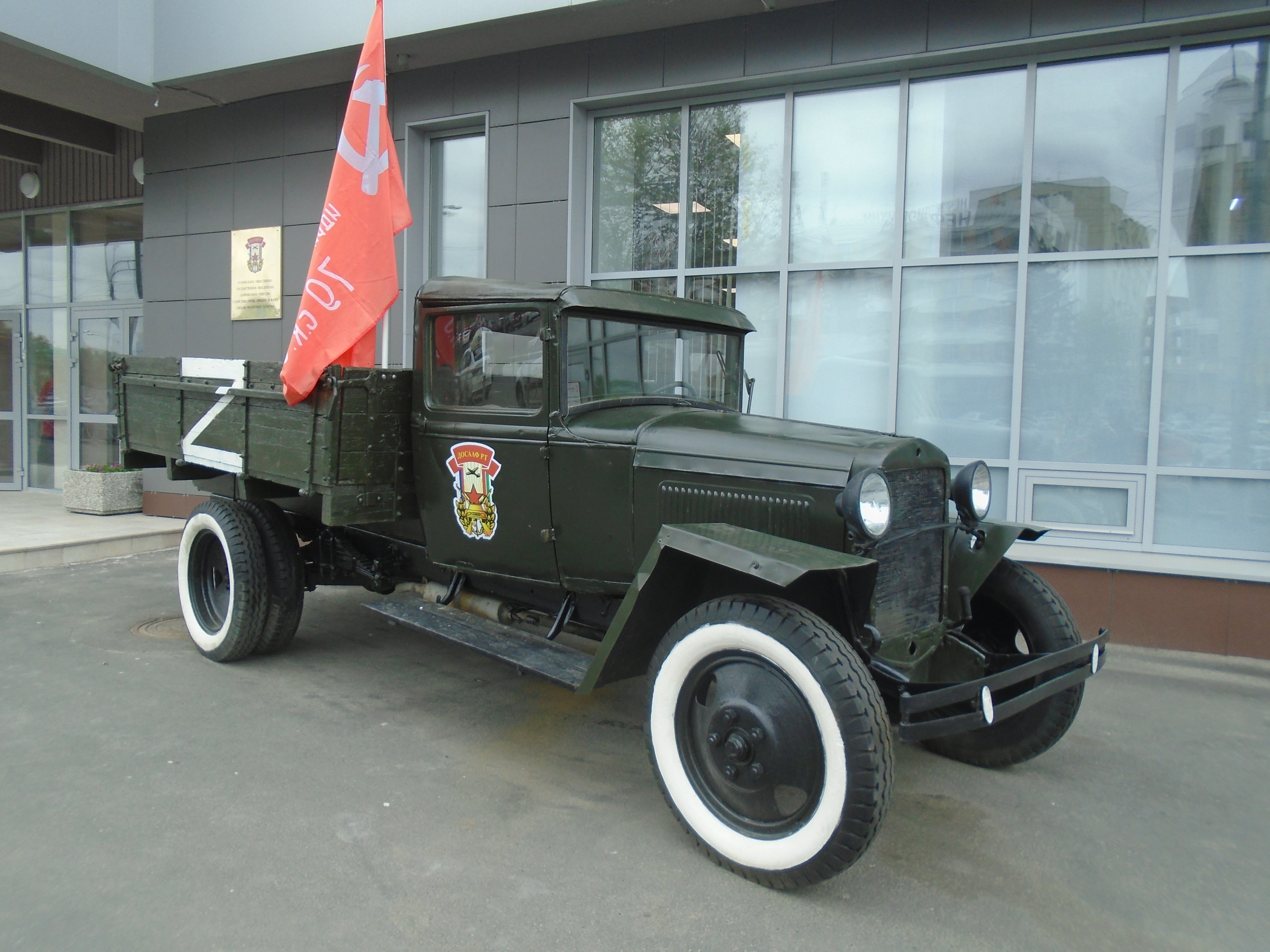
The Victory Banner and a Z symbol on a Russian military vehicle in Kazan.

Russia has extensively relied on possible nostalgia for the USSR to support its war effort during the 2022 invasion of Ukraine.

Following the invasion, many Russian tanks were shown flying the old flag of the Soviet Union alongside the pro-war Z military symbol. American political scientist Mark Beissinger told France 24 that the purpose of using these symbols was not necessarily to do with the ideology of communism, but rather a desire to re-establish "Russian domination over Ukraine", noting that the use of Soviet symbols in most post-Soviet states (with the exception of Russia and Belarus) is often seen as a deliberate provocative act rather than actually wanting to establish communism. Other observers noted that the Russian propaganda incorporates the Soviet symbols as a reference to the former Soviet power, alluding to its possible return.

Some suggest that the toponymic policy of the Russian forces is a manifestation of nostalgia: the settlements in the occupied Ukrainian territories are renamed to their Soviet names. These artificial names, created by the Bolsheviks in the 1920s and 1930s, were often references to communist leaders as a way to propagate the communist ideology. Ukraine has changed them, usually restoring the historic toponyms, during the decommunization process. Russian forces would again impose the Soviet names, for example: Artemivsk instead of Bakhmut, Krasny (Russian: Red) Liman instead of Lyman, Volodarske (a reference to V. Volodarsky) instead of Nikolske, Stakhanov (a reference to Alexei Stakhanov) instead of Kadiivka, etc. Other researchers argue that the Russian toponymic policy is primarily a Russification policy, rather than an effort driven by nostalgia.

==== Events ====
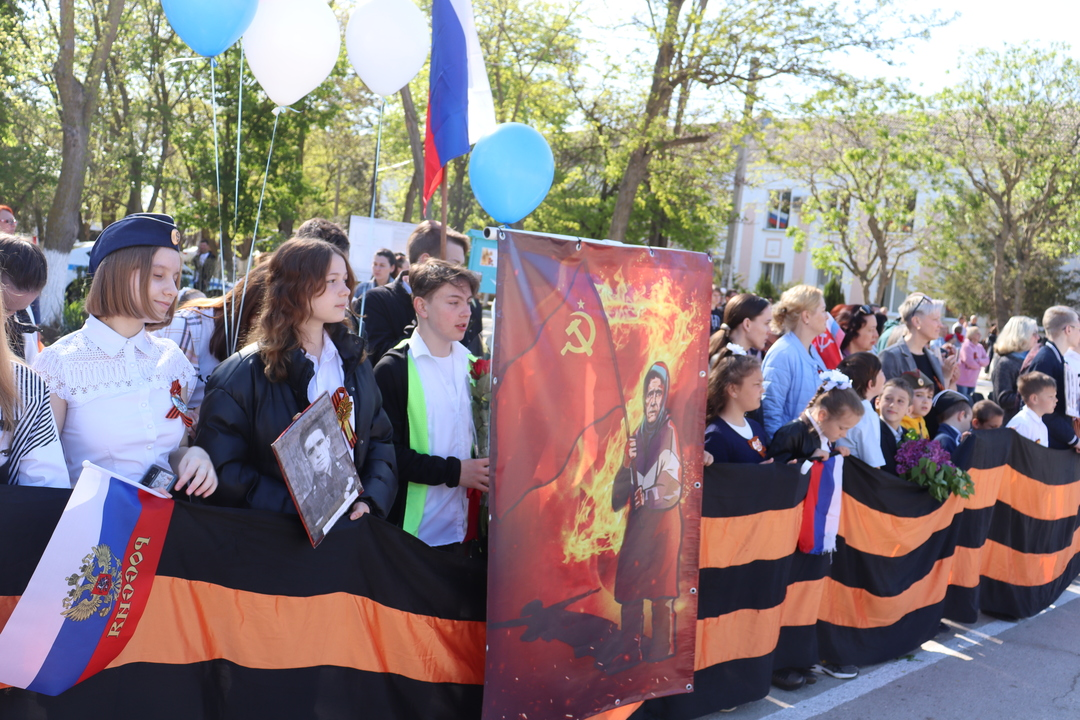
"Grandmother with a red flag" poster was used by Russian propaganda, as a reference to The Motherland Calls (a prominent World War II monument).

In April 2022, a video of a Ukrainian woman named Anna Ivanovna greeting Ukrainian soldiers at her home near Dvorichna, whom she thought to be Russian, with a Soviet flag went viral on pro-Russian social media, and featured on Russian state-controlled media. The woman said that she and her husband had "waited, prayed for them, for Putin and all the people". The Ukrainian soldiers gave her food, but went on to mock her and trample on her Soviet flag, after which she gave the food back and said "my parents died for that flag in World War Two". This was used by Russian propagandists to prove that the Russian invasion had popular support, in spite of the fact that most Ukrainians – even in Russian-speaking regions – opposed the invasion. In Russia, murals, postcards, street art, billboards, chevrons and stickers depicting the woman have been created. In Russian-controlled Mariupol, a statue of her was unveiled. She has been nicknamed "Grandmother (Russian: бабушка, romanized: babushka) Z", and the "Grandmother with a red flag" by Russians. Sergey Kiriyenko, a senior Russian politician, referred to her as "Grandma Anya".

Anna told the Ukrayinska Pravda that she met the soldiers with a Soviet flag not out of sympathy, but because she felt the need to reconcile with them so that they would not "destroy" the village and Ukraine after her house was shelled, but now feels like a "traitor" due to the way her image has been used by Russia. According to Ukrainian journalists, Anna and her son later fled to Kharkiv after their house was being shelled by the Russians.

On 9 May 2022, Vladimir Putin utilized Victory Day festivities and military parades to further justify his cause. As his response to the ongoing conflict during Victory Day, he stated "Russia has given a preemptive response to aggression. It was forced, timely and the only correct decision." He avoided directly mentioning the war and even refrained from using the word "Ukraine" in his response to the conflict during the Victory Day parade. Putin also drew parallels between the current Ukrainian government and that of Nazi Germany, praising Russia's military, saying that present troops were "fighting for the motherland, for her future, and so that nobody forgets the lessons of World War II".

On 26 August 2022, the Soviet Victory banner was hoisted over the village Pisky, a fortified area just off Donetsk whose capture is strategic for Russia, further pushing Ukrainian forces away from Donbas.

Many Lenin statues, which had been taken down by Ukrainian activists in the preceding years, were re-erected by Russian occupiers in Russian-controlled areas.

== See also ==
- Communist chic
- Hauntology
- History of communism in the Soviet Union
- National Bolshevism
- Neo-Sovietism
- Neo-Stalinism
- Sovietwave, a Russian musical subgenre of synthwave
- Soviet patriotism
- Soviet imagery during the Russo-Ukrainian War

=== Communist nostalgia in Europe ===
- Communist nostalgia, generally for the ideology
- Ostalgie, in the former East Germany
- PRL nostalgia, in the former Polish People's Republic
- Yugo-nostalgia, in the former Socialist Federal Republic of Yugoslavia
