= Soviet patriotism =

Patriotism theory developed by Vladimir Lenin

Flag of the Soviet Union, a common Soviet patriotic symbol.

Soviet patriotism is the socialist patriotism involving the attachment of the Soviet people to the Soviet Union as their homeland. It is also referred to as Soviet nationalism.

== Manifestation in the Soviet Union ==
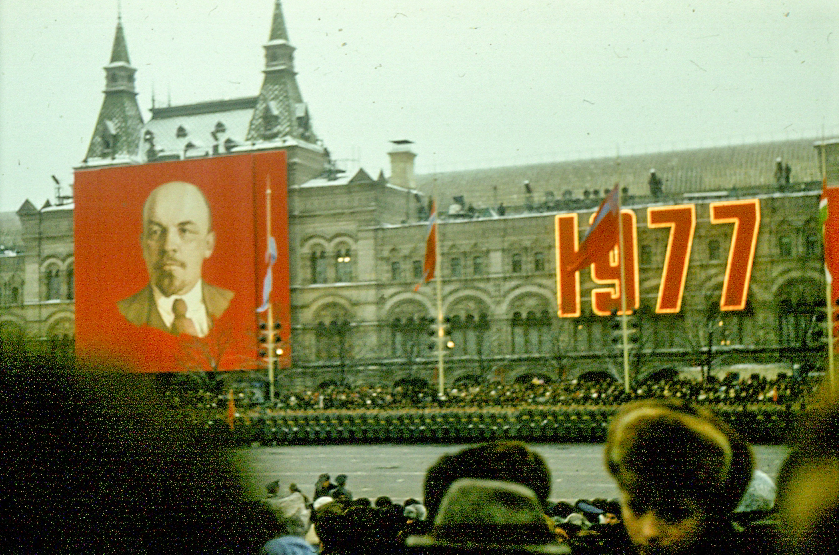
Military parade on October Revolution Day in Moscow in 1977.

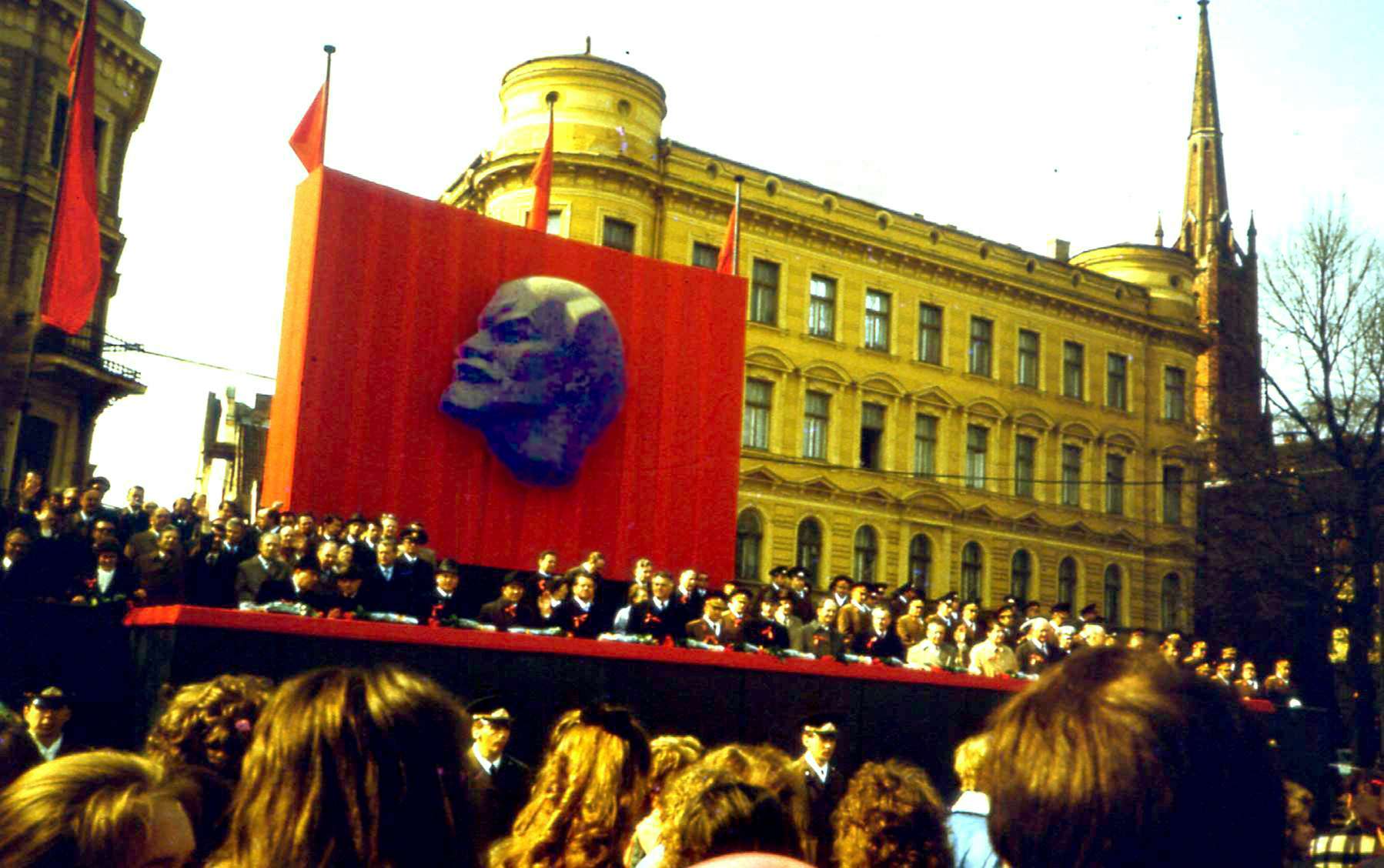
October Revolution Day in Riga, Latvia, Soviet Union in 1988.

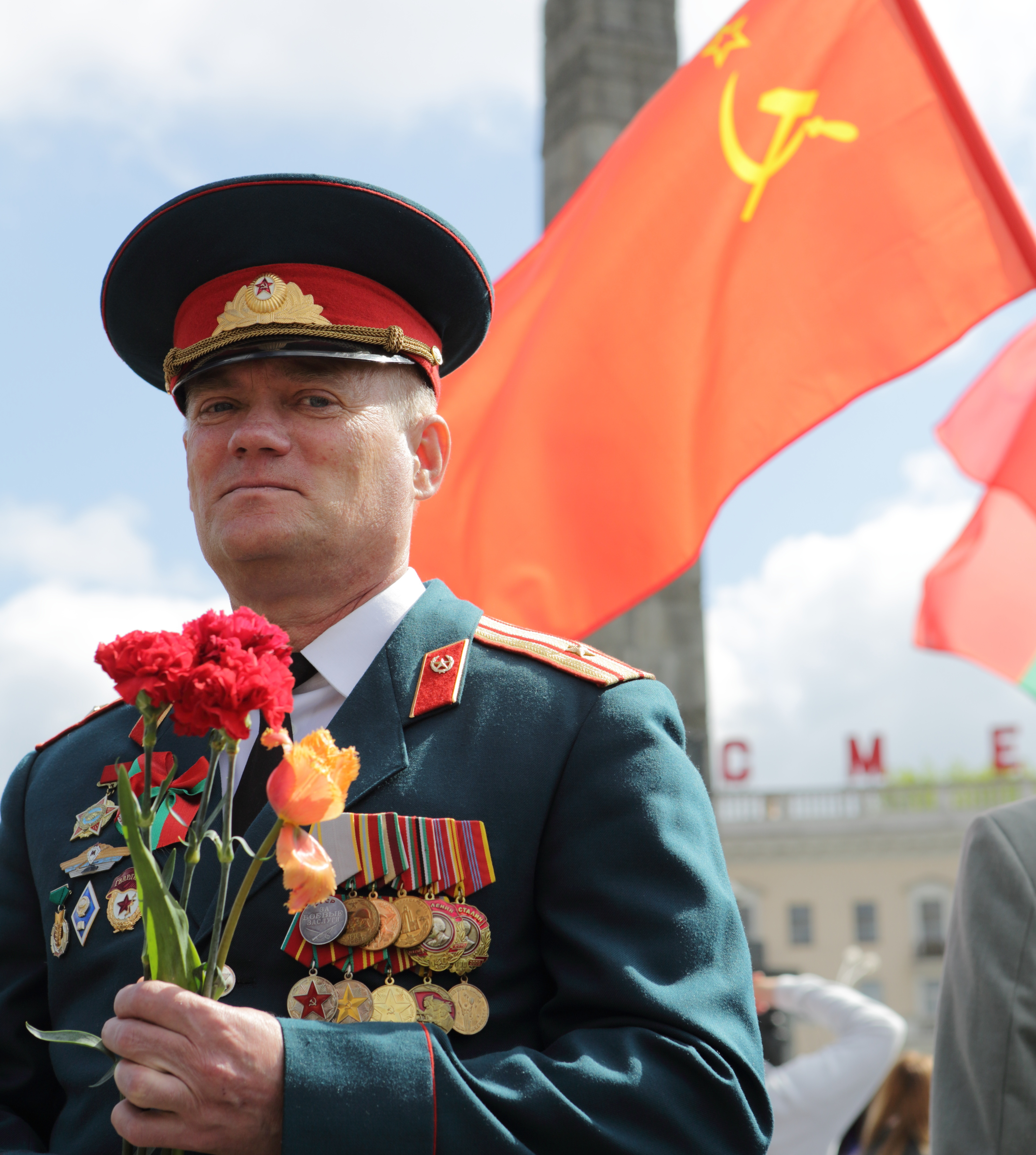
Member of the Armed Forces of Belarus pays tribute on Victory Day in 2014 with the Soviet flag flying in the background.

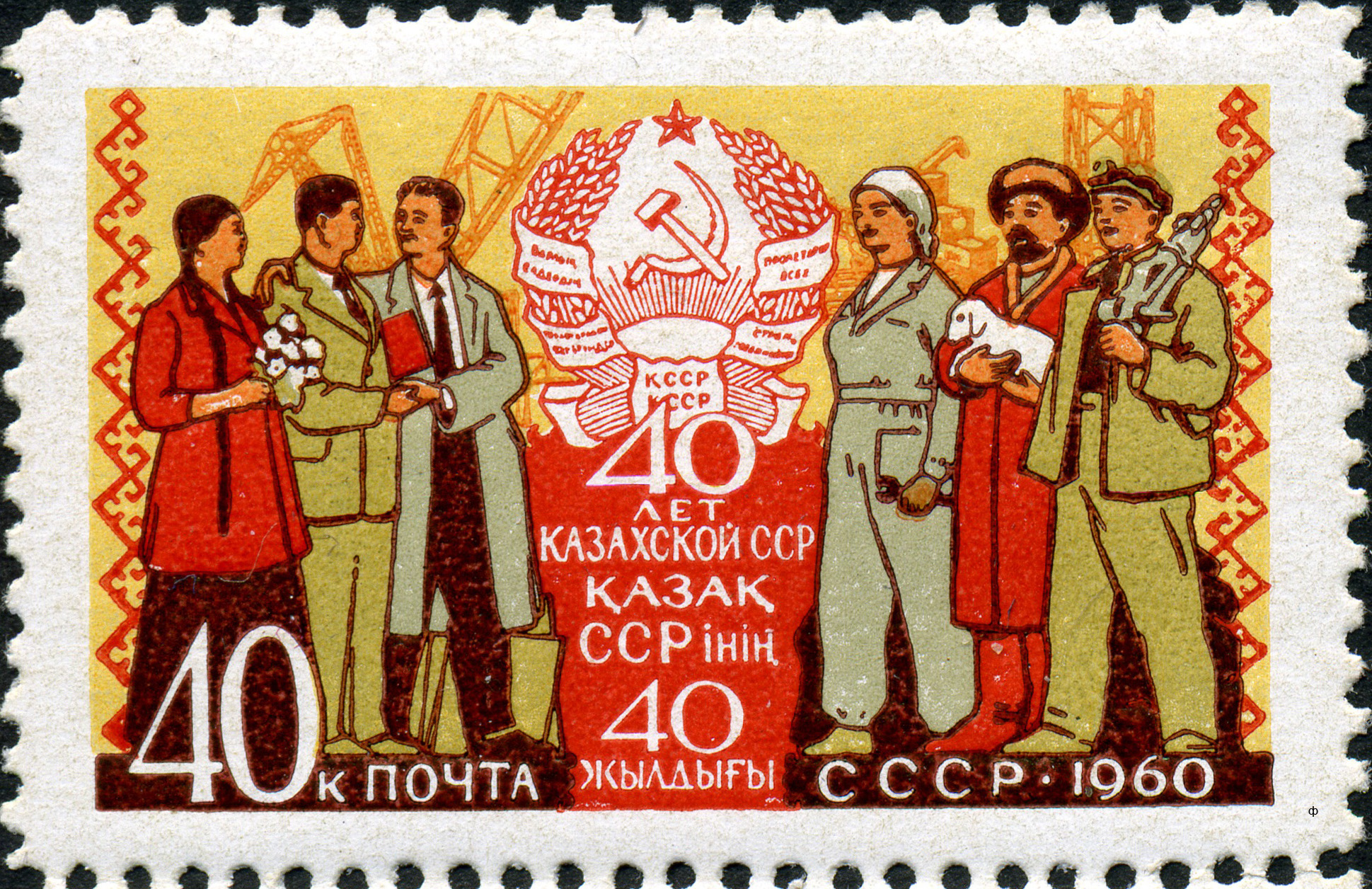
A Soviet stamp from 1960 celebrating the fortieth anniversary of the founding of Kazakh Autonomous Socialist Soviet Republic in 1920, the predecessor of the Kazakh Soviet Socialist Republic founded in 1936.

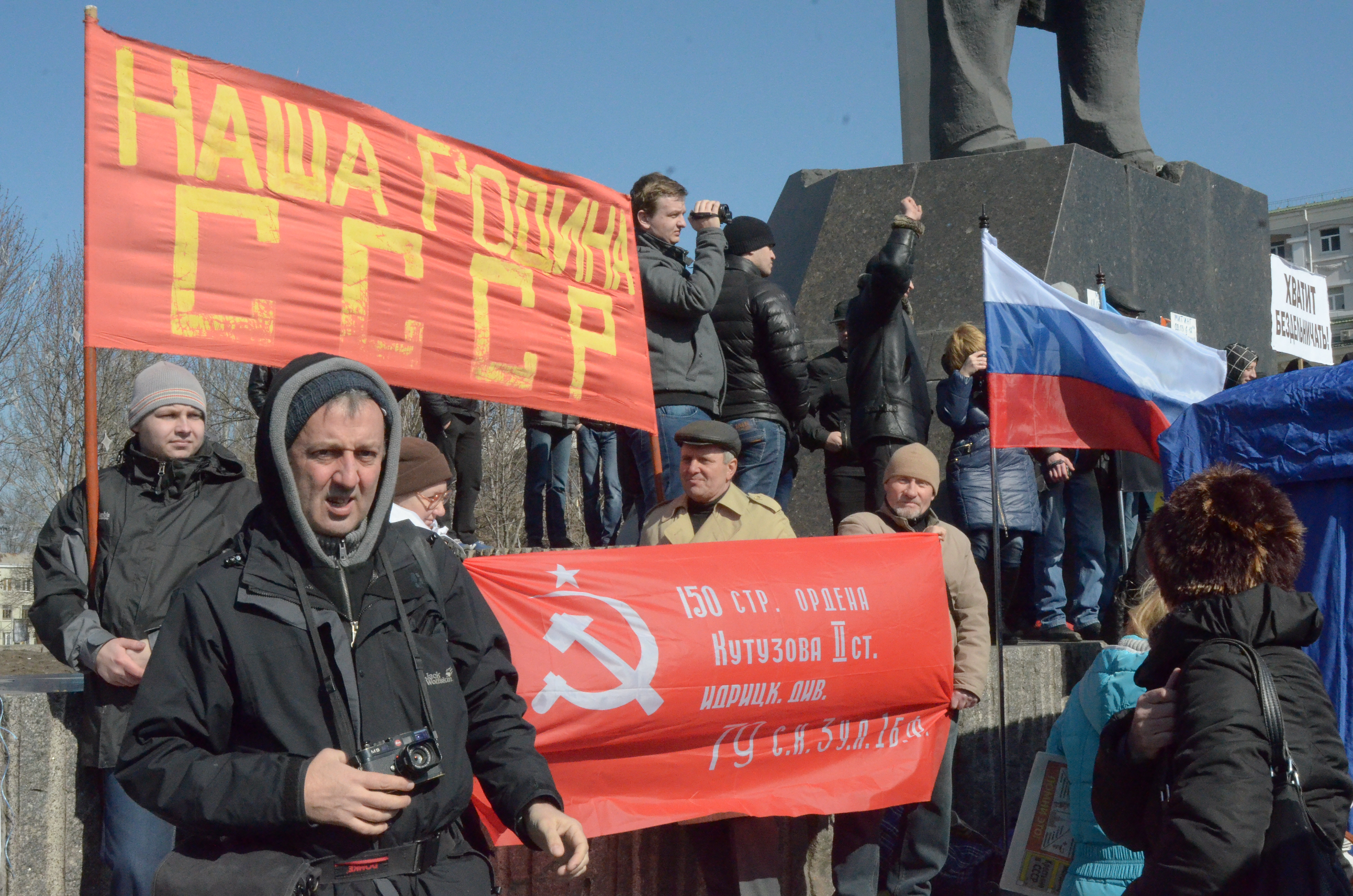
Protest against Ukrainian decommunization policies in Donetsk, 2014. The red banner with yellow script reads, "Our homeland is the USSR".

Under the outlook of world communism Vladimir Lenin separated patriotism into what he defined as proletarian, socialist patriotism from bourgeois nationalism. Lenin promoted the right of all nations to self-determination and the right to unity of all workers within nations, but he also condemned chauvinism and claimed there were both justified and unjustified feelings of national pride. Lenin explicitly denounced conventional Russian nationalism as "Great Russian chauvinism", and his government sought to accommodate the country's multiple ethnic groups by creating republics and sub-republic units to provide non-Russian ethnic groups with autonomy and protection from Russian domination. Lenin also sought to balance the ethnic representation of leadership of the country by promoting non-Russian officials in the Communist Party of the Soviet Union to counter the large presence of Russians in the Party. However, even at this early period the Soviet government appealed at times to Russian nationalism when it needed support - especially on the Soviet borderlands in the Soviet Union's early years.

Stalin emphasized a centralist Soviet patriotism that spoke of a collective "Soviet people" and identified Russians as being the "elder brothers of the Soviet people". During World War II, Soviet socialist patriotism and Russian nationalism merged, portraying the war not just as a struggle of communists versus fascists, but more as a struggle for national survival. During the war, the interests of the Soviet Union and the Russian nation were presented as the same, and as a result Stalin's government embraced Russia's historical heroes and symbols, and established a de facto alliance with the Russian Orthodox Church. The war was described by the Soviet government as the Great Patriotic War. Nationalities deemed "unreliable" were persecuted, and there were widespread deadly deportations during the Second World War.

Nikita Khrushchev moved the Soviet government's policies away from Stalin's reliance on Russian nationalism. Khrushchev promoted the notion of the people of the Soviet Union as being a supranational "Soviet People" that became state policy after 1961. This did not mean that individual ethnic groups lost their separate identities or were to be assimilated but instead promoted a "brotherly alliance" of nations that intended to make ethnic differences irrelevant. At the same time, Soviet education emphasized an "internationalist" orientation. Many non-Russian Soviet people suspected this "Sovietization" to be a cover for a new episode of "Russification", in particular because learning the Russian language was made a mandatory part of Soviet education, and because the Soviet government encouraged ethnic Russians to move outside of Russia and settle in other Soviet republics.

Efforts to achieve a united Soviet identity were severely damaged by the severe economic problems in the Soviet Union in the 1970s and 1980s resulting in a wave of anti-Soviet sentiment among non-Russians and Russians alike. Mikhail Gorbachev presented himself as a Soviet patriot dedicated to addressing the country's economic and political challenges, but he was unable to restrain the rising regional and sectarian ethnic nationalism, with the USSR breaking up in 1991.

== Contemporary Soviet patriotism ==
In modern-day Russia, the Communist Party of the Russian Federation is often said to follow the ideology of Soviet patriotism.

In many post-Soviet states such as Russia, Ukraine, Moldova, Belarus, Kazakhstan and others, there exists nostalgia for the Soviet Union, primarily among the older generation of people. Soviet symbolism and propaganda has been utilized by the Russian forces during the Russo-Ukrainian War (especially during the 2022 Russian invasion of Ukraine), to legitimize the actions of the Russian forces in Ukraine.

== See also ==
- Great Russian chauvinism
- Neo-Sovietism
- Propaganda in the Soviet Union § Patriotism
- Russian nationalism
- Socialist patriotism
- Sovietization
- Soviet imperialism
- Soviet people

== Bibliography ==
- Motyl, Alexander J. (2001). Encyclopedia of Nationalism, Volume II. Academic Press. ISBN 0-12-227230-7.
