= Nostalgiya =

Russian television channel

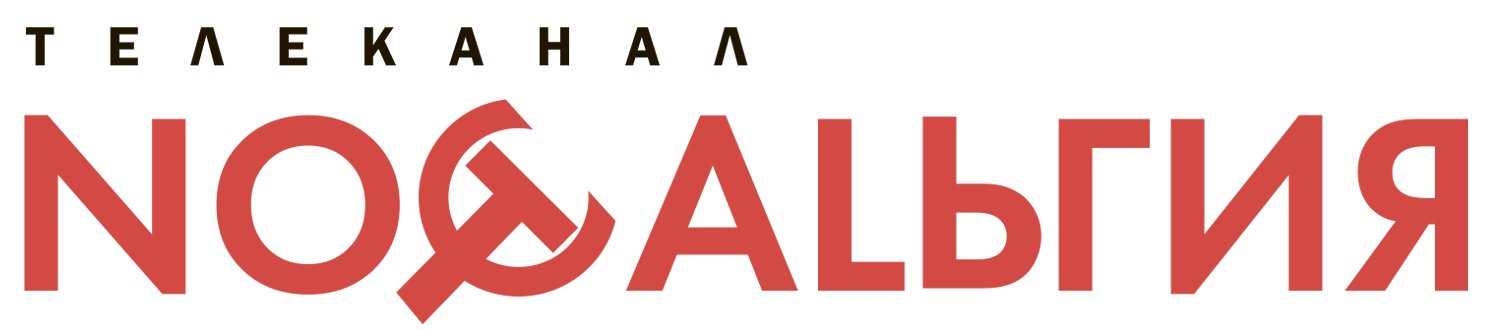
- Country: Russia
- Broadcast area: Russia; Kazakhstan; Azerbaijan; Armenia; Georgia; Estonia; Latvia; Lithuania; Belarus; Moldova; Israel; United States

Programming
- Language: Russian

Ownership
- Owner: Veriselintel (Russian: Вериселинтел)
- Key people: Vladimir Ananich

History
- Launched: 4 November 2004; 21 years ago

Links
- Website: www.nostalgiatv.ru

Nostalgiya (Russian: Ностальгия), stylized NOАLЬГИЯ, is a Russian television channel, catering to nostalgia for the Soviet Union. Launched in 2004, the channel broadcasts to almost all the European portion of the former Soviet Union as well as some countries of the "Far Abroad" (United States, Germany, Israel).

The logo of the channel is stylized with a combination of Cyrillic letters С and Т that looks like the hammer and sickle (☭) turned in the opposite direction to the right.

One of its main presentations is a talk show "Born in the USSR" (Russian: Рождённые в СССР; Rozhdyonnye v SSSR) which provides a daily interactive discussion with its spectators.
