= Primakov doctrine =

Russian geopolitical doctrine

The Primakov doctrine is a Russian political doctrine formulated in the 1990s. It assumes that the national security of Russia relies on its superpower status and therefore Russia cannot allow the formation of a unipolar international order led by the United States.

== History ==
The doctrine takes its name from Yevgeny Primakov, who was appointed as the Minister of Foreign Affairs of the Russian Federation by President Boris Yeltsin in 1996. Primakov led the efforts to redirect the foreign policy of Russia away from the West by advocating the formation of a strategic trilateral alliance of Russia, China and India to create a counterbalance to the United States in Eurasia.

The Primakov doctrine revolves around five key ideas: First, Russia is viewed as a powerful actor who pursues an independent foreign policy; Second, Russia ought to pursue a multipolar world managed by a concert of major powers; Third, Russia ought to pursue supremacy in the former Soviet sphere of influence and should pursue Eurasian integration; Fourth, Russia ought to oppose NATO expansion; Fifth, Russia should pursue a partnership with China.

The doctrine led to the gestation of a Russia, India and China trilateral format, which would eventually become the BRICS.

Russian Foreign Minister Sergey Lavrov brought the "Primakov doctrine" term into the geopolitical lexicon as least as early as 2014. He spoke on the eve of Primakov's 85th birthday, to celebrate the moment Primakov took control of the Russian Foreign Ministry from his predecessor, Andrei Kozyrev, who had charted a course of rapprochement with the West.

== Criticism ==
In 1997 the American foreign policy establishment labelled it as "Primakov doctrine". Ariel Cohen described the doctrine as a zero-sum game even while noting the strong bonds between Russia and Iran.

Mark Bassin observed that "a variety of very different Eurasian perspectives and doctrines have been articulated", and he pointed out those of Gennady Zyuganov and Aleksandr Dugin along with Primakov's. Of these three, Bassin describes Dugin as the best known and most prolific representative of post-Soviet neo-Eurasianism, and indeed Vladimir Putin was said by some as early as 2001 to be "a closet Eurasian".

According to Emanuel Copilaş, Primakov was the architect of Moscow's geopolitical reorientation from the Western space to the Eurasiatic space. Copilaş writes: "the neo-Eurasianist inspiration of Primakov's geopolitical concept is undeniable". Copilaş attaches the label of "Primakov Doctrine" to the "political articulation of Neo-Eurasianism".

Ekaterine Meiering-Mikadze, a diplomat with the Middle East Institute, wrote in 2020 that the Black Sea might soon be the focus of Putinian attention, and adduced as support the Primakov doctrine, according to which Putin sees a zone of influence in Russia's "near abroad", and this had "already made it into the so-called Primakov Doctrine published in 1998–1999. Doctrines are one thing, but operations are another. Putin has been the catalyst for operationalizing these strategic ideas into geopolitical objectives that have since made international news. Underpinned by Putin's use of the oil and gas industry, this deadly recipe has provided a roadmap for how to make Russia great again. What happens in the Black Sea with Putin's pervasive patchwork politics of pipelines, intimidation, occupation, and annexation is therefore only one variation of a theme that resonates throughout all of Russia's geopolitical ambitions."
