= Sovietization =

Adoption of Soviet political system and mentality

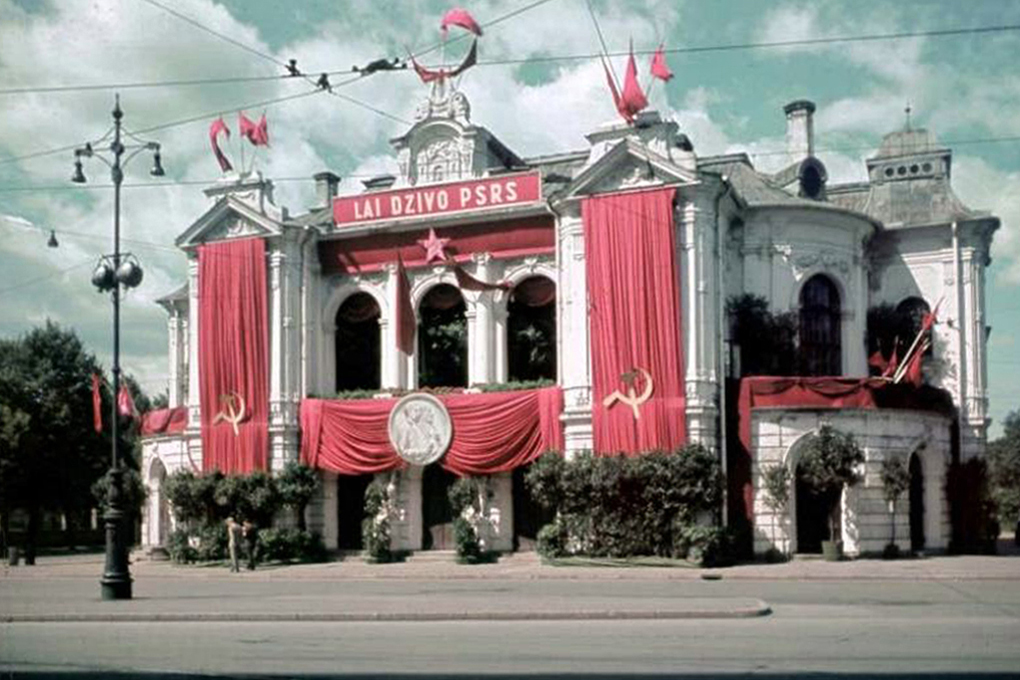
Latvian National Theatre decorated with Soviet symbols (hammer and sickle, red star, red flags and a double portrait of Vladimir Lenin and Joseph Stalin) after the Soviet occupation in 1940. The text on top reads "Long live the USSR!"

Sovietization (Russian: советизация, romanized: sovyetizatsiya [səvʲɪtʲɪˈzat͡sɨjə]) is the adoption of a political system based on the model of soviets (workers' councils) or the adoption of a way of life, mentality, and culture modeled after the Soviet Union.

A notable wave of Sovietization (in the second meaning) occurred during the Russian Civil War in the territories captured by the Red Army. Later, the territories occupied by the Russian SFSR and the USSR were Sovietized. Mongolia was conquered by the Soviet Union and Sovietized in the 1920s, and after the end of the Second World War, Sovietization took place in the countries of the Soviet Bloc (Eastern and Central Europe: Czechoslovakia, East Germany, Hungary, Poland, the Baltic states, etc.). In a broad sense, it included the creation of Soviet-style authorities, new elections held by Bolshevik party members with opposition parties being restricted, the nationalization of private land and property, and the repression against representatives of "class enemies" (kulaks, or osadniks, for instance). Mass executions and imprisoning in Gulag labor camps and exile settlements often accompany that process. This was usually promoted and sped up by propaganda aimed at creating a common way of life in all states within the Soviet sphere of influence. In modern history, Sovietization refers to the copying of models of Soviet life (the cult of the leader's personality, collectivist ideology, mandatory participation in propaganda activities, etc.).

In a narrow sense, the term Sovietization is often applied to mental and social changes within the population of the Soviet Union and its satellites, which led to creation of the new Soviet man (according to its supporters) or Homo Sovieticus (according to its critics).

== See also ==
- Establishment of Soviet power in Russia (1917–1918)
- Sovietization of the Baltic states
- Soviet patriotism
- Soviet empire
- Russification
- Korenizatsiia
- National delimitation in the Soviet Union
- Neo-Sovietism
