= Near abroad =

Russian term for post-Soviet states

The former Eastern Bloc Russia Formerly part of the Soviet Union Formerly Warsaw Pact Formerly SFR Yugoslavia

In the political language of Russia, the "near abroad" (Russian: ближнее зарубежье, romanized: blizhneye zarubezhye) refers to the post-Soviet states (other than Russia itself) which became independent after the dissolution of the Soviet Union. American journalist and political commentator William Safire describes the term as the "most significant diplomatic coinage since the popularization of detente" that entered into the English language in early 1992.

== Origin of the term ==
It was noted that the Russian foreign minister Andrei Kozyrev used the term in the early 1990s, referring to Central and Eastern Europe. However, the usage of the expression is attested before Kozyrev became minister, giving translators a hard time. Early attempts to translate the term into English include "the concept of 'abroad close at hand'", "nearby foreign lands", and "countries not far abroad". As a result of the acceptance of the term "near abroad", the word "abroad" has acquired the function of a noun in English.

Christian Caryl noted that a Russian historian, Ivan Ivanovich, told him in 1991 that originally the term had an ironic gist, as a distinction from the "true" abroad. William Safire also mentions an opinion that the term was widely used by Soviet dissidents in the 1970s–1980s as an ironic reference to the "socialist comrades", i.e., communist member states of the Eastern Bloc.

== Political meaning ==
In 1992, Andrei Kozyrev also referred to South Korea as a near abroad: "the priority of the Russian Foreign Ministry is to have good neighborly relations with all those who directly surround us. Again, this is the USA, Japan, Western and Eastern Europe and, of course, the CIS. And the so-called near abroad is not only the CIS: when you are in Vladivostok or Khabarovsk, it is quite obvious that the very near abroad is, for example, South Korea."

"Near abroad" became more widely used in English, usually to assert Russia's right to have a major influence on the region, Russian President Vladimir Putin has declared the region as Russia's "sphere of influence", and strategically vital for Russia. The concept has been compared to the Monroe Doctrine.

In his lengthy essay The End of the Near Abroad, Thomas de Waal, among other things, expressed the opinion that the Russo-Ukrainian war put the end of the concept of "near abroad" as a Russian sphere of influence. In particular, Armenia and Moldova seem to take an advantage of the political situation to break off from the control by Russia. Some other neighbours of Russia are trying to take an economic advantage from their increased trade with Russia due to the economic sanctions of the West.

One of the indicators of the decreasing influence of Russia in its "near abroad" is the diminishing status of the Russian language (which had, among the languages of the Soviet Union, a preferred status of the "language of interethnic communication"): in many post-Soviet states (other than Russia itself), there is a sharp decrease in the knowledge of Russian among the younger generations.

Thomas de Waal expresses a caveat: turning the "near abroad" away from Russia does not necessarily mean turning to the West: for the states in Central Asia, aligning with China and Turkey are possible alternatives.

== See also ==
- America's Backyard
- American imperialism
- Belt and Road Initiative
- Balkan Federation
- Commonwealth of Independent States
- Collective Security Treaty Organization
- Cooperation between China and Central and Eastern European Countries
- Customs Union of the Eurasian Economic Union
- Foreign relations of Russia
  - Eurasianism
  - Moscow, third Rome
  - Primakov doctrine
  - Russian imperialism
  - Russian world
  - Union State of Russia and Belarus
- Limitrophe states
- Serbian–Montenegrin unionism
- Sino-Soviet split
- Soviet Empire
