= Pamela Druckerman =

American-French writer and journalist

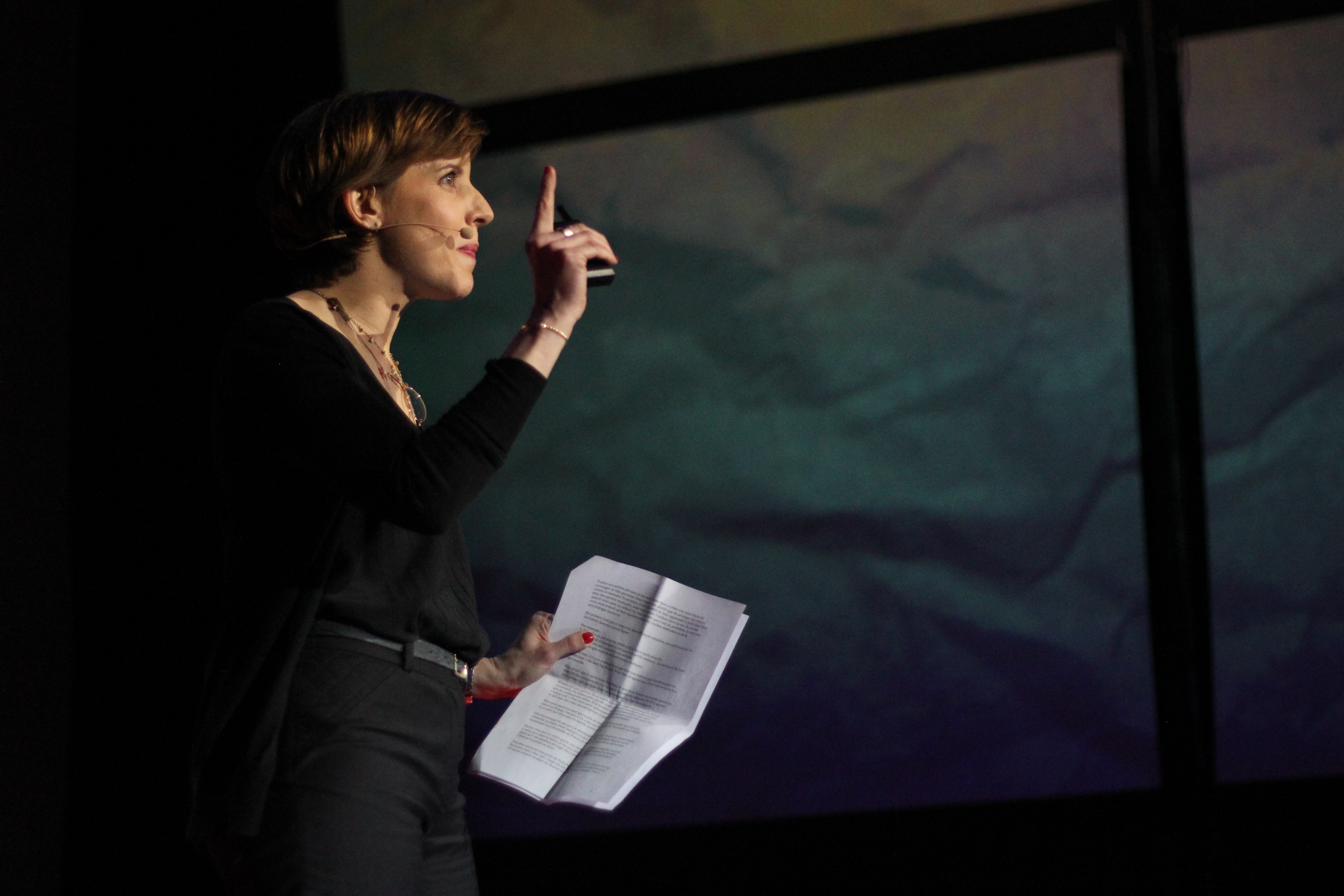
Pamela Druckermann at TEDxParis on 28 March 2013

Pamela Druckerman is an American-French writer and journalist living in Paris, France. In fall 2013, she became a contributing opinion writer for The New York Times International Edition.

== Education and early life ==
Pamela Druckerman grew up in Miami where her "life plan elegantly combined the city’s worship of bodies and money, and its indifference to how you came by either." She is Jewish.

She received a bachelor's degree in philosophy from Colgate University and a master's in international affairs from Columbia University's School of International and Public Affairs in 1998.

From 1997 to 2002, she was a staff reporter at The Wall Street Journal based in Buenos Aires, Argentina; São Paulo, Brazil; and New York, covering economics and politics. She has also reported from Tokyo, Japan; Moscow, Russia; Johannesburg, South Africa; and Jerusalem, Israel. Previously she was a Council on Foreign Relations term member and performed improv comedy with the Upright Citizens Brigade.

She became a naturalised French citizen in 2017.

== Writing ==
Druckerman is best known as the author of Bringing Up Bébé: One American Mother Discovers the Wisdom of French Parenting, a book about French parenting philosophy and tips published by Penguin in 2012. It was published in the United Kingdom as French Children Don't Throw Food by Doubleday.

She also published Lust In Translation: Infidelity from Tokyo to Tennessee in 2007 with Penguin Group that examined the nature of marital infidelity. She claims that North America is the worst place to have an extramarital affair, because of the high degree of honesty Americans expect from their partners, and observed that the French have a much more understanding and permissive attitude towards adultery.

She produced the short film The forger for The New York Times with Samantha Stark and Alexandra Garcia, which won the 2017 News and Documentary Emmy Award. This short film uses shadow animation to tell the story of Adolfo Kaminsky, the famous Parisian forger who made fake passports and saved thousands of children from the Nazis.

Her latest book is published in 2018 and it is a portrait of modern middle age called There Are No Grown-Ups: A Midlife Coming-of-Age Story, which Kirkus Reviews called "a trenchant and witty book on maturity and ‘middle-age shock.’"

Her op-eds and articles have appeared in The New York Times, The Washington Post, Marie Claire, The Guardian, and Monocle. She also appears on news shows, including Good Morning America, the Today show, National Public Radio, and BBC. Druckerman was nominated as one of Time 100 most influential people of 2012.
