= Nina Andreyeva =

Soviet and Russian chemist (1938–2020)

- Нина Андреева
- Andreyeva in 1995

General Secretary of the All-Union Communist Party of Bolsheviks
- In office 8 November 1991 – 24 July 2020

Personal details
- Born: 12 October 1938 Leningrad, Russian SFSR, Soviet Union
- Died: 24 July 2020 (aged 81) St. Petersburg, Russia
- Party: All-Union Communist Party of Bolsheviks (1991–2020)
- Other political affiliations: Communist Party of the Soviet Union (1966–1991)

Nina Alexandrovna Andreyeva (Russian: Нина Александровна Андреева; 12 October 1938 – 24 July 2020) was a Soviet Russian chemical scientist, teacher, author, and political activist. A supporter of classical Soviet principles, she wrote an essay entitled I Cannot Forsake My Principles that defended many aspects of the traditional Soviet system, and criticized General Secretary Mikhail Gorbachev and his closest supporters for not being true communists. In the rebuke published in the official party newspaper Pravda the essay was called The Manifesto of Anti-Perestroika Forces.

== Career in chemistry ==
She was born in Leningrad (now St. Petersburg), and was a chemistry lecturer at the Leningrad Technological Institute. She joined the Communist Party of the Soviet Union (CPSU) around 1966.

== I Cannot Forsake My Principles ==
Andreyeva's essay I Cannot Forsake My Principles (Не могу поступаться принципами; variously translated in English commentary) was published in the newspaper Sovetskaya Rossiya on March 13, 1988, at a time when Gorbachev and Alexander Yakovlev were either about to start on overseas visit or already abroad, and was initiated and approved by the secretary of the Communist Party's Central Committee, Yegor Ligachev. She was contemptuous of Perestroika and defended the Soviet leader Joseph Stalin. Of the Great Purges, "they are being blown out of proportion" she wrote.

Giulietto Chiesa, then Moscow correspondent of the Italian Communist newspaper L'Unità, found Andreyeva's original letter and discovered that it had been rewritten, only 5 pages of her 18-page typescript were published, much of the rest being thought too extreme. In the originally unpublished portions, Andreyeva commented that Stalin's critics wrote "in the language of Goebbels" and referred to "nations of little importance, like the Crimean Tartars and Zionist Jews."

Party officials critical of the reforms welcomed the published essay. Ligachev told the official news agency TASS to send the Andreyeva letter to local newspapers throughout the Soviet Union to publish it. It was much reprinted in the Soviet Union and East Germany, but it received no critical response in the media. The Leningrad party issued a television documentary apparently showing mass support in the city for the Andreyeva letter.

Not until after Gorbachev had returned from abroad, and following a two-day meeting of the politburo on March 24–25 to discuss the Andreyeva letter, did a response appear in Pravda on 5 April 1988. The Pravda article described the letter as containing "nostalgia, backward-looking patriotism," the work of "blind, die-hard, undoubting dogmatists." Gorbachev stated that there were mixed reactions to the article within the politburo, with members such as Vorotnikov and Ligachev characterizing the article as an understandable reaction to the negative view of the Soviet past. Gorbachev described it as a direct attack "against perestroika."

"A year and a half later, Evgeny Dodolev was able to charm Andreeva—possibly on false pretenses—into sitting for a longform interview for Vzgliad".

Under the reforms, she told David Remnick of The Washington Post in 1989 that under Stalin "the country built socialism for 30 years" and stated: "Our media are lying about Stalin now. They are blackening our history." On then current conditions, she told him: "The political structure of an anti-socialist movement is taking place in the form of democratic unions and popular fronts." She said of Leningrad television: "they'll show an artist, a painter, who is supposedly a representative of Russian art. But excuse me, he is not a Russian. He is a Jew." She added: "You can say Russian, Ukrainian, why not Jew? Does it diminish the person? Why hide him behind some other nationality. Jew and Zionist mean different things, but all Zionists are Jews." In the Sovetskaya Rossiya letter, she attacked "cosmopolitan" conspirators.

For his book Lenin's Tomb: The Last Days of the Soviet Empire (1993), Remnick drew on his contact with Andreyeva.

== Subsequent career ==
By July 1990, she was heading an organization called Yedinstvo (Unity) which aimed to return the country to the Bolshevik principles of Lenin and was planning to leave the CPSU. The New York Times described the group in August 1991 as "a haven for many hard-line Communists".

Andreyeva later played a leadership role in the formation of post-Soviet communist organisations. Founded in November 1991, the All-Union Communist Party of Bolsheviks (initially Bolshevik Platform), Andreyeva was the party general secretary and the party wanted a mass campaign to replace Boris Yeltsin. It saw itself as the successor to the CPSU. In October 1993, the party was temporarily suspended along with fifteen other organisations after President Yeltsin's repression implemented after a constitutional crisis. In May 1995 she was removed from the post as the head of the St. Petersburg Central Committee of the party for "lack of revolutionary activity."

Nina Andreyeva died in St. Petersburg on 24 July 2020.

== Works ==
- Andreyeva, Nina (1992). The Cause of Socialism is Invincible. Pyongyang: Foreign Languages Publishing House. ASIN B0041SY99A.
- — (1993). Unpresented Principles or a Brief History of Perestroika: (Selected Articles and Speeches). Pyongyang: Foreign Languages Publishing House. OCLC 476436091.
- — (2002). За Большевизм в Коммунистическом Движении [For Bolshevism in the Communist Movement]. Leningrad: Publishing House of the All-Union Communist Party Bolsheviks.
