= All-Union Communist Party (Bolsheviks) (1995) =

All-Union Communist Party (Bolsheviks) Всесоюзная Коммунистическая Партия (большевиков)
- Founder: Alexander Lapin
- Founded: 1995; 31 years ago
- Preceded by: All-Union Communist Party of Bolsheviks (1991)
- Newspaper: Bolshevistskaya Pravda (Bolsheviks' Truth) (1995-2010), Bolshevistskoe Znamya (Bolsheviks' Banner) (from 2010)
- Youth wing: All-Union Young Guard Bolsheviks
- Ideology: Communism; Marxism–Leninism; Stalinism; Bolshevism; Anti-revisionism
- Political position: Far-left
- Slogan: "Workers of the world, unite!" (Russian: "Пролетарии всех стран, соединяйтесь!")
- Anthem: The Internationale

Party flag

Website
- bolshevick.org

All-Union Communist Party (Bolsheviks) (Russian: Всесоюзная Коммунистическая партия (большевиков)), (Vsesoyuznaya Kommunystycheskaya partiya ВКП(б)) is a communist party operating in the former Soviet Union. ВКП(б) was formed in 1995, following a split from the All-Union Communist Party of Bolsheviks (1991) (VKPB).

In 2009, the police accused Alexander Lapin and his wife Zinaida Smirnova of abusing their adopted daughter. Because of this, they left Russia.

From VKP(b) foundation until 2012, the First secretary of the Central Committee of the party was its founder Alexander Lapin. In 2012 Lapin was expelled from the party.

Since 2017, convergence has begun between VKP(b) and another breakaway from Nina Andreeva's All-Union Communist Party of Bolsheviks - VKPB(r). The parties worked to create a single organization.

In 2019, the congress of VKP(b) and VKPB(r) was held, which was supposed to be unifying. But in the end, the parties did not come to an agreement.

In November 2021, VKP(b) merged with another breakaway from Nina Andreeva's VKPB — VKPB (Sverdlovsk Congress). The new organization was called the Marxist-Leninist Party of Bolsheviks (MLPB). In the ranks of VKP(b), not everyone accepted the merger and part of the organization continued to function under the same name.

== See also ==
- List of anti-revisionist groups
