= All-Union Communist Party of Bolsheviks (1991) =

All-Union Communist Party of Bolsheviks Всесоюзная Коммунистическая партия большевиков
- Leader: Secretariat of the Central Committee (collective leadership; disputed); Nikolai Degtyarenko (as General Secretary of the Central Committee; disputed)
- Founder: Nina Andreyeva
- Founded: 8 November 1991; 34 years ago
- Preceded by: Bolshevik Platform of the CPSU
- Headquarters: Saint Petersburg (the central committee headed by Zelikov); Pyatigorsk (the central committee headed by Degtyarenko)
- Newspaper: Serp i Molot (Hammer and Sickle), Raboche-krest'yanskaya pravda (Workers' and Peasants' Truth); Vpered (Forward)
- Youth wing: All-Union Young Guard Bolsheviks
- Membership (2013): 22,000 (2013)
- Ideology: Communism; Marxism–Leninism; Stalinism; Bolshevism; Anti-revisionism
- Political position: Far-left
- International affiliation: World Anti-Imperialist Platform
- Colours: Red
- Slogan: "Workers of the world, unite!" (Russian: "Пролетарии всех стран, соединяйтесь!")
- Anthem: The Internationale

Party flag

Website
- vkpb.ru (disputed) vkpb-skb.ru (recognized by the Pyatigorsk Central Committee; disputed)

The All-Union Communist Party of Bolsheviks (VKPB; Russian: Всесоюзная коммунистическая партия большевиков; ВКПБ; Vsesoyuznaya kommunisticheskaya partiya bolshevikov, VKPB) is an unregistered anti-revisionist Marxist–Leninist communist party operating in Russia and other former Soviet states. It was founded in November 1991 and led by Nina Andreyeva, a university teacher who was well known for her 1988 open letter "I can't compromise my principles", published in the newspaper Sovetskaya Rossiya.

The party is known for its sectarian positions. It opposes the Communist Party of the Russian Federation due to its "reformist" character and has refused to back its candidates for presidential election. It is also outspokenly critical of the Russian church and religion in general, demanding the separation of church and state, and Vladimir Putin's regime.

== History ==
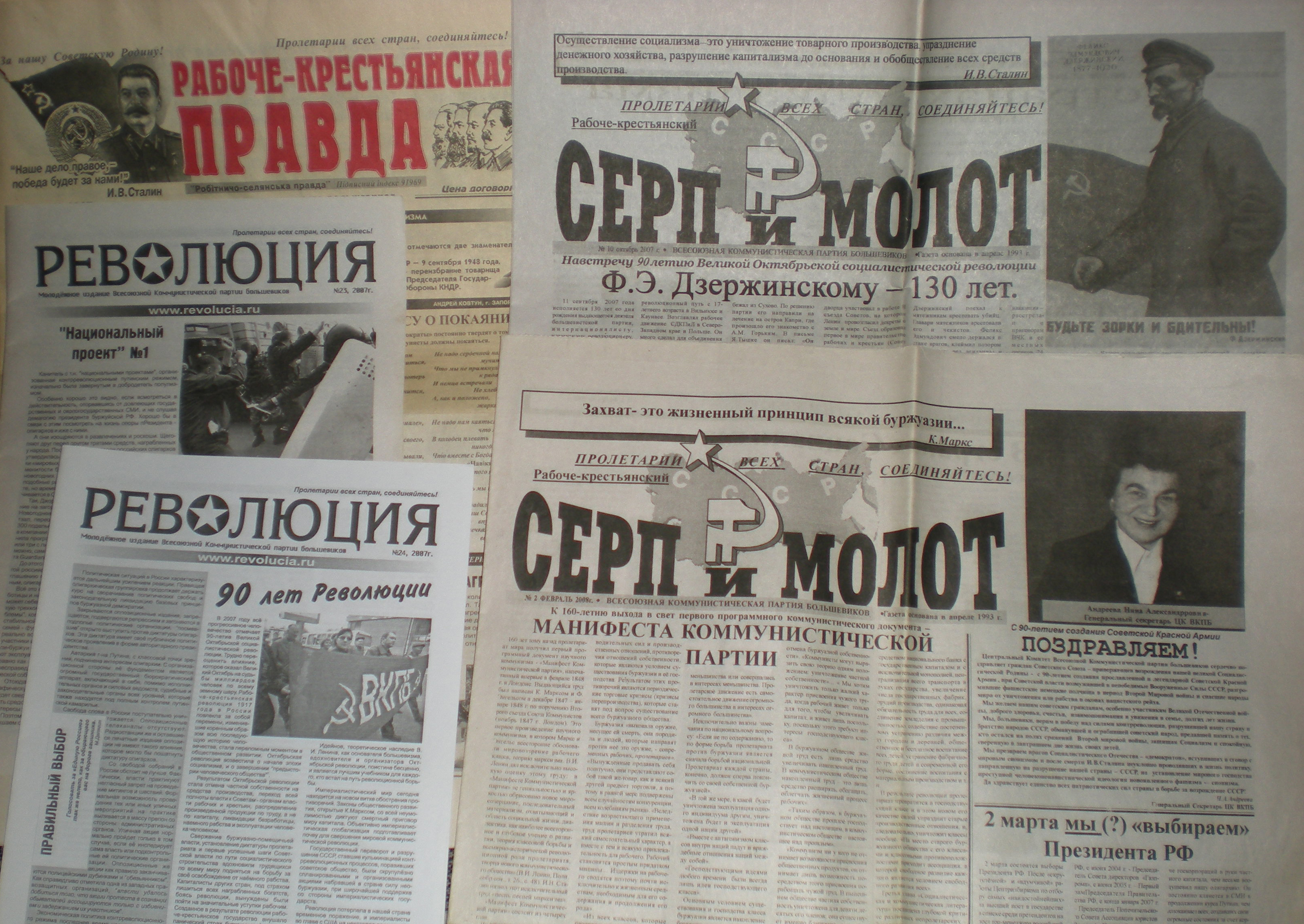
Newspapers of the party

The VKPB has its origins in the Bolshevik Platform of the Communist Party of the Soviet Union, which was formed on 13 July 1991. This platform directly opposed the official party leadership under Mikhail Gorbachev, considering Perestroika to be destructive to the socialist system in the USSR. The platform was led by Nina Andreyeva, a lecturer at the Leningrad Technological Institute.

On 21 September 1991, a conference of the All-Union Society "Unity for Leninism and Communist Ideals" was held in the Leningrad Oblast, along with members of the Organizing Committee of the Bolshevik Platform in the CPSU. The conference decided to prepare for the founding congress of the Bolshevik-Leninist Party. As a result, the founding congress of the All-Union Communist Party of Bolsheviks was held semi-legally in Leningrad on 8 November 1991. The party's founders declared their inheritance of revolutionary traditions and a complete break with the "anti-people policy of the opportunist leadership" of the CPSU, which had initiated "the destruction of the socialist system, the collapse of the country, and the liquidation of the party created by Lenin."

It published a newspaper called Edinstvo (Единство), Bolshevik (Большевик), Bolshevik Kavkaza (Большевик Кавказа), Bolshevik Stavropol'ja (Большевик Ставрополья), Bolshevik Osetii (Большевик Осетии), Vpered (Вперед), Serp i Molot (Серп и Молот), Golos Stalingrada (Голос Сталинграда) and Raboche-Krest'janskaja pravda (Рабоче-Крестьянская правда). Its youth section is the All-Union Young Guard Bolsheviks.

During its history, the party has experienced several splits. Splinters often took similar names.

- All-Union Communist Party (Bolsheviks) (VKP(b)) — the split occurred in 1995, after the expulsion of Secretary Alexander Lapin, over the issue of the party's participation in the parliamentary elections of that year.
- All-Union Communist Party of Bolsheviks (Revolutionaries) (VKPB(r)) — split in 2015 after a conflict between Andreyeva's supporters and party members who accused her of abandoning Bolshevism and veering the party to the right. As a result, the Central Committee expelled the protesting group, which, in turn, reorganised and declared itself a revival of the true VKPB.
- In the summer of 2020, after Andreyeva's death, a group of members formed the alternative Central Committee of the VKPB, which is based in Pyatigorsk. Its General Secretary is Nikolay Degtyarenko. The organization is called VKPB (North Caucasus Bureau) (VKPB (SKB)). The organization considers itself the real VKPB.
- Since 2022, the VKPB (General Secretary V. Zelikov) supplements its name with the name of Nina Andreyeva — VKPB (Nina Andreyeva's)
- In 2021, some of the party's primary organizations held an independent congress. These organizations received the informal name VKPB (Sverdlovsk Congress).

In December 2021, a joint plenum of the Central Committees of the VKPB and VKP(b) was held, where a decision was made to prepare for a unification congress.

In November 2022, the VKP(b) and VKPB (Sverdlovsk Congress) held a unification congress. The new party was named the Marxist–Leninist Party of Bolsheviks (MLPB) (Russian: Марксистско-ленинская партия большевиков). However, this decision was not made by all the primary organizations of the VKP(b).

== Ideology ==
The official ideology of the VKPB is Bolshevism in its orthodox, revolutionary form, endorsing the creative development of Marxist-Leninist theory as pioneered by Joseph Stalin. The VKPB actively condemns revisionism in the communist movement. It considers its primary goal to be a socialist revolution, followed by the establishment of the dictatorship of the proletariat.

== See also ==
- List of anti-revisionist groups
- Neo-Sovietism
