= International Meeting of Communist and Workers' Parties =

Marxist-Leninist-led communist political international

- Map of countries with at least one party affiliated with the IMCWP
- Status: Active
- Frequency: Annual
- Inaugurated: 1998; 28 years ago
- Members: 124
- Website: www.solidnet.org

The International Meeting of Communist and Workers' Parties (IMCWP) is an annual Marxist–Leninist-led conference attended by communist and workers' parties from several countries worldwide. It originated in 1998 when the Communist Party of Greece (KKE) invited communist and workers' parties to participate in an annual conference where parties could gather to share their experiences and issue a joint declaration. The IMCWPs bear the same name as the International Meetings of Communist and Workers' Parties that were hosted by the Communist Party of the Soviet Union (CPSU) throughout the 20th century, for the first time in 1957.

The parties participating in the IMCWPs can publish materials on their joint website SolidNet, meaning Solidarity Network, which is operated by the KKE. SolidNet's declared purpose is "to inform on the activities as well as the ideological and political views of different Communist and Workers' Parties on national and international issues", while it also acts as the official website of the IMCWPs, where the contributions of all the parties of every IMCWP are published.

The most recent and 24th IMCWP was held on 7-9 August 2026 in Havana and hosted by the Communist Party of Cuba (PCC), under the title "Defending and honouring the legacy of the Cuban Revolution on the centenary of Fidel’s birth; deepening solidarity with socialist Cuba; strengthening our joint actions; and uniting our forces for peace and against imperialist aggression". The 24th IMCWP was originally scheduled to be held in Lebanon, hosted by the Lebanese Communist Party (LCP) between 25–27 October 2024, but was postponed due to the Israeli invasion of Lebanon.

== Organization ==
The Working Group (WG) of the International Meetings of Communist and Workers' Parties (IMCWPs) is composed of parties throughout the world. The task of the WG is to prepare and organize the IMCWPs.

The meetings are held annually, with participants from all around the globe. Additionally, there are occasionally extraordinary meetings such as the meeting in Damascus in September 2009 on "Solidarity with the heroic struggle of the Palestinian people and the other people in Middle East". In December 2009, the communist and workers' parties agreed to the creation of the International Communist Review (ICR), which is published annually in English, Spanish and Greek and has a website.

== Participation ==
	Date	Host country	Host city	Host Party
1st	21–23 May 1999	Greece	Athens	Communist Party of Greece
2nd	23–26 June 2000	Greece	Athens	Communist Party of Greece
3rd	22–24 June 2001	Greece	Athens	Communist Party of Greece
4th	21–23 June 2002	Greece	Athens	Communist Party of Greece
5th	19–21 June 2003	Greece	Athens	Communist Party of Greece
6th	8–10 October 2004	Greece	Athens	Communist Party of Greece
7th	18–20 November 2005	Greece	Athens	Communist Party of Greece
8th	10–12 November 2006	Portugal	Lisbon	Portuguese Communist Party
9th	3–5 November 2007	Belarus	Minsk	Communist Party of Belarus
10th	21–23 November 2008	Brazil	São Paulo	Communist Party of Brazil
11th	20–22 November 2009	India	New Delhi	Communist Party of India (Marxist); Communist Party of India
12th	3–5 December 2010	South Africa	Johannesburg	South African Communist Party
13th	9–11 December 2011	Greece	Athens	Communist Party of Greece
14th	22–25 November 2012	Lebanon	Beirut	Lebanese Communist Party
15th	8–10 November 2013	Portugal	Lisbon	Portuguese Communist Party
16th	13–15 November 2014	Ecuador	Guayaquil	Communist Party of Ecuador
17th	30 October – 1 November 2015	Turkey	Istanbul	Communist Party of Turkey
18th	28–30 October 2016	Vietnam	Hanoi	Communist Party of Vietnam
19th	5–7 November 2017	Russia	Moscow; Saint Petersburg	Communist Party of the Russian Federation
20th	23–25 November 2018	Greece	Athens	Communist Party of Greece
21st	18–20 October 2019	Turkey	İzmir	Communist Party of Turkey; Communist Party of Greece
22nd	27–29 October 2022	Cuba	Havana	Communist Party of Cuba
23rd	20–22 October 2023	Turkey	İzmir	Communist Party of Turkey
24th	7–9 August 2026	Cuba	Havana	Communist Party of Cuba

The following table is a list of participants in each meeting.

Key:

✓ = participated
– = did not participate
o = observer
m = sent message
/ = defunct

Country	Party	2026	2023	2022	2021	2019	2018	2017	2016	2015	2014	2013	2012	2011	2010	2009	2008	2007	2006	2005	2004	2003	2002	2001
Albania	Communist Party of Albania	–		–	–	–	✓	–	–	–	–	–	–	✓	–	–	–	–	–	✓	✓	✓	✓	–
Algeria	Party for Democracy and Socialism	m	✓	✓	✓	✓	✓	–	✓	–	✓	✓	✓	–	–	✓	✓	✓	✓	✓	✓	✓	✓	
Argentina	Communist Party of Argentina	✓		–	✓	✓	✓	✓	–	–	✓	✓	–	m	✓	✓	✓	–	✓	✓	m	m	m	✓
Armenia	Armenian Communist Party	–		–	–	–	✓	✓	–	–	–	–	–	✓	–	–	–	✓	–	–	–	✓	✓	✓
Australia	Communist Party of Australia	✓	✓	✓	✓	✓	✓	✓	–	–	✓	✓	m	✓	✓	✓	–	✓	✓	✓	✓	✓	✓	✓
Austria	Communist Party of Austria	✓		✓	–	–	✓	✓	–	–	–	–	–	–	–	–	–	–	–	✓	m	✓	✓	–
Austria	Party of Labour of Austria	✓	✓	✓	✓	–	–	–	–	–	–	–	–	–	–	–	–	–	–	–	–	–	–	–
Azerbaijan	Communist Party of Azerbaijan	–	✓	✓	✓	✓	✓	✓	–	✓	–	✓	✓	✓	✓	–	–	✓	–	–	–	–	–	–
Bahrain	National Democratic Trend	–		–	–	–	–	–	–	–	–	–	–	–	–	–	–	–	–	–	–	–	–	✓
Bahrain	National Liberation Front	–		–	–	–	–	–	–	–	–	–	–	–	–	–	–	–	–	–	–	–	m	–
Bahrain	Progressive Democratic Tribune	–	✓	–	✓	✓	✓	✓	–	–	✓	✓	✓	–	–	–	–	✓	✓	✓	✓	✓	–	–
Bangladesh	Communist Party of Bangladesh	m		–	✓	–	–	–	–	–	–	–	–	–	–	–	–	–	–	–	–	–	–	–
Bangladesh	Workers Party of Bangladesh	–		✓	–	✓	✓	✓	–	✓	–	–	✓	✓	✓	–	–	–	–	–	–	–	–	–
Belarus	Communist Party of Belarus	–	✓	–	–	–	✓	✓	–	–	✓	✓	✓	✓	✓	–	✓	✓	–	✓	–	m	✓	✓
Belgium	Communist Party of Belgium	–	✓	✓	✓	✓	✓	✓	–	–	–	–	–	m	–	–	–	–	–	–	–	–	m	–
Belgium	Workers' Party of Belgium	✓	✓	–	✓	✓	–	–	✓	✓	–	✓	✓	✓	–	✓	✓	✓	✓	✓	✓	✓	✓	✓
Bolivia	Communist Party of Bolivia	–	✓	–	–	–	✓	–	–	–	✓	–	–	m	–	✓	–	–	–	–	–	–	–	–
Bosnia and Herzegovina	Workers' Communist Party	–		–	–	–	–	–	–	–	–	–	–	–	–	–	–	–	✓	✓	m	–	–	–
Brazil	Brazilian Communist Party	–	✓	✓	✓	✓	✓	✓	–	✓	✓	✓	✓	✓	✓	✓	✓	–	✓	–	–	m	–	–
Brazil	Communist Party of Brazil	✓	✓	✓	✓	✓	✓	✓	–	✓	✓	✓	✓	✓	✓	✓	✓	✓	✓	✓	✓	✓	✓	✓
Bulgaria	Communist Party "Georgi Dimitrov"	–		–	–	–	–	✓	–	–	–	–	–	–	–	–	–	–	–	✓	✓	✓	✓	✓
Bulgaria	Communist Party of Bulgaria	–		–	–	–	✓	✓	–	✓	–	✓	–	✓	✓	–	✓	✓	–	✓	✓	m	✓	✓
Bulgaria	Initiative Committee	–		–	–	–	✓	–	–	–	–	–	–	–	–	–	–	–	–	–	–	–	–	–
Bulgaria	Socialist Party – Marxist Platform	–		–	–	–	–	–	–	–	–	–	–	–	–	–	–	–	–	–	–	–	–	✓
Canada	Communist Party of Canada	✓	✓	✓	✓	✓	✓	✓	–	✓	✓	✓	✓	✓	✓	✓	✓	✓	✓	✓	✓	✓	✓	✓
Chile	Communist Party of Chile	✓		–	–	–	–	✓	–	–	–	✓	m	–	–	–	✓	✓	✓	m	m	m	m	–
China	Communist Party of China	–	✓	–	–	✓	✓	✓	–	✓	✓	✓	✓	–	✓	✓	✓	✓	o	o	–	m	o	–
Colombia	Colombian Communist Party	–		✓	–	–	–	✓	–	–	✓	–	–	–	–	–	✓	–	✓	–	m	✓	✓	✓
Colombia	Common Alternative Revolutionary Force	–		–	–	–	–	✓	–	–	–	–	–	–	–	–	–	–	–	m	–	m	✓	✓
Costa Rica	People's Vanguard Party	–		–	–	–	–	–	–	–	✓	–	–	–	–	–	–	–	–	–	–	–	–	–
Croatia	Socialist Labour Party of Croatia	–	✓	–	✓	✓	✓	✓	–	–	–	–	✓	✓	–	–	–	–	–	–	–	–	–	–
Cuba	Communist Party of Cuba	Host	✓	✓	✓	✓	✓	✓	–	✓	✓	✓	✓	✓	✓	✓	✓	✓	✓	✓	✓	✓	✓	✓
Cyprus	Progressive Party of Working People	✓	✓	–	✓	✓	✓	✓	–	✓	✓	✓	✓	✓	✓	✓	✓	✓	✓	✓	✓	✓	✓	✓
Czech Republic	Communist Party of Bohemia and Moravia	✓	✓	–	✓	✓	✓	✓	–	✓	✓	✓	✓	✓	✓	✓	✓	✓	✓	✓	✓	✓	✓	✓
Denmark	Communist Party in Denmark	/		✓	✓	✓	✓	✓	–	✓	✓	✓	✓	✓	✓	✓	✓	✓	✓	✓	✓	✓	✓	✓
Denmark	Communist Party of Denmark	✓	✓	✓	–	✓	✓	✓	–	✓	✓	✓	✓	✓	✓	✓	✓	✓	✓	✓	✓	✓	✓	–
Dominican Republic	Force of the Revolution	–		–	–	–	✓	–	–	–	–	–	–	–	–	–	–	–	–	–	–	–	✓	–
Ecuador	Communist Party of Ecuador	✓		–	✓	–	✓	✓	–	–	✓	✓	–	–	–	–	✓	–	–	–	m	–	–	–
Egypt	Egyptian Communist Party	m		–	–	–	–	✓	–	–	–	✓	✓	✓	–	–	–	–	–	✓	–	✓	✓	✓
El Salvador	Communist Party of El Salvador	m	✓	–	–	✓	–	–	–	–	–	–	–	–	–	–	–	–	–	–	–	–	–	–
Estonia	Communist Party of Estonia	–		–	–	–	✓	✓	–	–	–	–	–	–	–	–	–	–	–	✓	✓	–	–	–
Eswatini	Communist Party of Swaziland	m		✓	✓	–	✓	–	–	–	–	–	–	–	–	–	–	–	–	–	–	–	–	–
Finland	Communist Party of Finland	–	✓	✓	✓	✓	✓	✓	–	✓	✓	✓	✓	✓	✓	✓	✓	✓	✓	✓	m	✓	✓	m
France	French Communist Party	✓		✓	✓	✓	✓	✓	–	✓	✓	✓	✓	✓	✓	✓	✓	–	o	–	–	✓	m	–
Georgia	Unified Communist Party of Georgia	–	✓	–	–	✓	✓	✓	–	✓	–	✓	–	✓	–	–	✓	✓	✓	✓	✓	–	–	–
Germany	German Communist Party	✓	✓	✓	✓	✓	✓	✓	–	✓	✓	✓	✓	✓	✓	✓	✓	✓	✓	✓	✓	m	✓	–
Greece	Communist Party of Greece	✓	✓	✓	✓	✓	✓	✓	–	✓	✓	✓	✓	✓	✓	✓	✓	✓	✓	✓	✓	✓	✓	✓
Guyana	People's Progressive Party	–		–	–	–	–	–	–	–	–	✓	–	✓	–	–	–	–	–	–	–	–	–	–
Hungary	Hungarian Workers' Party	–	✓	✓	✓	✓	✓	✓	–	✓	✓	✓	✓	✓	✓	✓	✓	✓	✓	✓	–	✓	✓	✓
India	Communist Party of India	✓	✓	✓	✓	✓	✓	✓	–	✓	✓	✓	m	✓	✓	✓	✓	✓	✓	m	✓	✓	m	✓
India	Communist Party of India (Marxist)	✓	✓	✓	✓	✓	✓	✓	–	✓	✓	–	✓	✓	✓	✓	✓	✓	✓	✓	m	✓	m	✓
Iran	Tudeh Party of Iran	–	✓	✓	✓	✓	✓	✓	–	✓	–	✓	m	m	–	✓	✓	✓	✓	✓	✓	✓	✓	✓
Iraq	Iraqi Communist Party	–	✓	–	✓	✓	✓	✓	–	✓	–	✓	✓	✓	✓	✓	✓	✓	✓	✓	✓	✓	✓	✓
Iraq	Communist Party of Kurdistan – Iraq	–	✓	–	✓	✓	✓	✓	–	✓	–	–	✓	✓	–	–	–	–	–	m	–	–	✓	✓
Ireland	Communist Party of Ireland	m	✓	✓	✓	–	✓	✓	–	✓	✓	✓	✓	✓	✓	✓	✓	✓	–	✓	✓	✓	–	–
Ireland	Workers' Party (Ireland)	✓	✓	✓	✓	✓	✓	✓	–	✓	–	✓	✓	✓	✓	–	✓	–	✓	✓	✓	✓	✓	–
Israel	Communist Party of Israel	–		–	✓	✓	✓	✓	–	✓	–	✓	–	–	✓	✓	–	✓	–	✓	✓	✓	✓	✓
Italy	Communist Party	–	✓	✓	✓	✓	✓	✓	–	–	–	–	–	–	–	–	–	–	–	–	–	–	–	–
Italy	Italian Communist Party	✓		–	–	✓	✓	✓	–	–	–	–	–	–	–	–	–	–	–	–	–	–	–	–
Italy	Party of Italian Communists	–		–	–	–	–	–	–	–	✓	✓	✓	✓	✓	✓	✓	✓	✓	✓	✓	✓	m	✓
Italy	Communist Refoundation Party	✓		–	–	–	–	–	–	–	–	–	✓	✓	✓	✓	✓	–	✓	✓	✓	✓	✓	✓
Japan	Japanese Communist Party	✓		–	–	–	–	–	–	–	–	–	–	–	–	–	–	–	–	–	–	–	–	–
Jordan	Jordanian Communist Party	–		–	✓	✓	✓	✓	–	–	✓	–	✓	✓	–	–	–	✓	–	✓	✓	m	–	✓
Kazakhstan	Communist Party of Kazakhstan	–		–	–	–	✓	✓	–	✓	–	–	–	–	–	–	–	–	–	–	–	–	–	–
Kazakhstan	Socialist Movement of Kazakhstan	–	✓	✓	✓	–	✓	✓	✓	–	–	–	–	–	–	–	–	–	–	–	–	–	–	–
Kenya	Communist Party of Kenya	–																						
Kenya	Communist Party Marxist - Kenya	–																						
Korea, DPR	Workers' Party of Korea	–	✓	✓	✓	✓	✓	✓	–	–	✓	✓	–	✓	–	✓	✓	✓	–	✓	✓	✓	✓	✓
Kyrgyzstan	Party of Communists of Kyrgyzstan	–		✓	–	–	✓	✓	–	–	–	–	–	–	–	✓	–	✓	–	–	–	–	–	–
Laos	Lao People's Revolutionary Party	✓	✓	✓	✓	✓	✓	✓	–	✓	✓	✓	–	–	–	✓	✓	✓	✓	m	m	m	–	m
Latvia	Socialist Party of Latvia	–	✓	–	✓	✓	✓	✓	–	–	–	✓	–	–	–	✓	✓	✓	✓	✓	✓	✓	✓	✓
Lebanon	Lebanese Communist Party	–	✓	–	✓	✓	✓	✓	–	✓	✓	✓	✓	✓	✓	✓	✓	✓	✓	✓	✓	✓	✓	✓
Lithuania	Socialist Party of Lithuania	–		–	–	✓	✓	✓	–	✓	✓	–	–	–	–	–	–	✓	–	✓	✓	m	–	–
Luxembourg	Communist Party of Luxembourg	m	✓	✓	–	✓	✓	–	–	–	–	✓	m	m	✓	✓	✓	✓	✓	✓	✓	✓	–	–
Luxembourg	The Left	–		–	–	–	–	–	–	–	–	–	–	–	–	–	–	–	–	–	–	–	–	m
North Macedonia	Communist Party of Macedonia	m	✓	–	–	✓	✓	✓	–	✓	–	–	–	–	–	–	–	✓	✓	✓	–	–	–	m
North Macedonia	League of Communists of Macedonia	–		–	–	–	–	–	–	–	–	–	–	–	–	–	–	–	–	–	–	–	–	–
Madagascar	Congress Party for the Independence	–		–	–	–	✓	✓	–	–	–	–	–	–	–	–	–	–	–	✓	–	–	–	–
Malta	Communist Party of Malta	–		–	–	–	✓	–	–	–	–	✓	m	m	–	–	–	–	✓	✓	✓	–	–	–
Mexico	Communist Party of Mexico	✓	✓	✓	✓	✓	✓	✓	–	✓	✓	✓	✓	✓	–	✓	✓	✓	✓	✓	✓	✓	✓	–
Mexico	Popular Socialist Party	✓	✓	✓	✓	–	–	✓	–	–	–	–	–	–	–	–	–	✓	✓	–	–	–	m	–
Mexico	Socialist People's Party of Mexico	✓		✓	–	–	–	✓	–	–	–	–	–	–	–	–	–	–	–	m	m	✓	✓	m
Moldova	Party of Communists	–		–	–	–	–	✓	–	–	–	✓	–	–	–	–	–	✓	–	m	✓	m	✓	m
Nepal	Communist Party of Nepal (Unified Marxist–Leninist)	✓		–	–	✓	✓	✓	–	–	–	–	✓	✓	✓	✓	✓	✓	–	–	m	m	m	m
Netherlands	Communist Party of the Netherlands	✓	✓	✓	–	✓	✓	–	–	✓	–	–	✓	✓	✓	✓	✓	–	✓	✓	✓	✓	✓	✓
Norway	Communist Party of Norway	✓	✓	–	✓	✓	✓	✓	–	✓	✓	✓	✓	✓	✓	✓	✓	✓	✓	✓	✓	✓	✓	✓
Pakistan	Communist Party of Pakistan	–	✓	✓	✓	–	✓	✓	–	–	–	✓	m	m	–	✓	–	✓	–	–	–	–	–	–
Palestine	Palestinian Communist Party	✓	✓	✓	✓	✓	✓	✓	–	✓	✓	✓	✓	✓	✓	✓	✓	–	–	✓	✓	m	m	–
Palestine	Palestinian People's Party	–	✓	–	✓	–	✓	✓	–	✓	–	✓	✓	✓	✓	✓	✓	–	–	–	✓	m	✓	–
Panama	People's Party of Panama	–		–	–	–	–	✓	–	–	✓	✓	–	–	–	–	✓	–	–	–	–	–	–	–
Paraguay	Paraguayan Communist Party	✓	✓	–	✓	✓	✓	✓	–	–	–	–	–	–	–	–	✓	–	–	–	–	–	–	–
Peru	Communist Party of Peru – Red Fatherland	✓		–	–	–	–	✓	–	–	✓	–	–	–	–	–	✓	–	✓	–	–	–	–	–
Peru	Peruvian Communist Party	✓		✓	✓	–	–	✓	–	–	✓	✓	–	–	✓	✓	✓	–	✓	–	–	–	–	–
Philippines	Communist Party of the Philippines – 1930	–		–	✓	–	–	✓	–	m	–	m	–	–	–	–	–	✓	–	✓	✓	m	m	–
Poland	Communist Party of Poland	–		–	✓	✓	–	✓	–	–	–	✓	–	–	–	–	–	✓	–	✓	✓	m	✓	–
Portugal	Portuguese Communist Party	✓	✓	–	✓	✓	✓	✓	✓	✓	✓	✓	✓	✓	✓	✓	✓	✓	✓	✓	✓	✓	m	✓
Romania	Romanian Communist Party	–		–	–	–	–	–	–	–	–	–	–	–	–	–	–	–	–	✓	✓	✓	–	✓
Romania	Romanian Socialist Party	–		–	✓	–	–	–	–	–	–	–	–	–	–	–	–	–	–	–	–	–	–	–
Romania	Socialist Alliance Party	–		–	–	–	–	–	–	–	–	✓	–	–	–	–	–	–	–	✓	✓	m	m	–
Russia	Communist Party of the Russian Federation	–	✓	–	✓	✓	✓	✓	–	✓	✓	✓	✓	✓	✓	✓	✓	✓	✓	✓	✓	✓	✓	✓
Russia	Russian Communist Workers' Party	–	✓	✓	✓	–	✓	✓	–	✓	✓	✓	✓	✓	✓	✓	✓	✓	✓	✓	✓	✓	✓	✓
Russia	Communist Party of the Soviet Union	–		–	✓	✓	✓	✓	–	✓	–	✓	✓	✓	✓	–	–	✓	–	✓	✓	–	✓	–
Serbia	New Communist Party of Yugoslavia	–	✓	✓	✓	m	✓	✓	✓	✓	✓	✓	–	✓	✓	✓	✓	✓	✓	✓	✓	✓	–	–
Serbia	Party of Communists of Serbia	–	✓	✓	✓	✓	✓	✓	–	✓	–	–	–	✓	–	–	–	–	–	–	–	–	–	–
Slovakia	Communist Party of Slovakia	–		–	–	–	✓	✓	–	–	–	–	–	–	–	–	–	✓	✓	✓	✓	✓	✓	✓
South Africa	South African Communist Party	–	✓	–	✓	✓	✓	✓	–	✓	✓	✓	✓	✓	✓	✓	✓	–	✓	m	m	–	–	m
Spain	Communist Party of Spain	✓	✓	✓	✓	✓	✓	✓	–	✓	✓	✓	✓	✓	✓	✓	–	✓	✓	✓	✓	✓	✓	✓
Spain	Communists of Catalonia	✓	✓	✓	✓	✓	✓	✓	–	–	–	✓	✓	✓	–	–	–	–	✓	m	–	–	–	–
Spain	Communist Party of the Peoples of Spain	✓	✓	✓	✓	✓	✓	✓	–	✓	✓	✓	✓	✓	✓	✓	✓	✓	✓	✓	✓	✓	✓	✓
Spain	Communist Party of the Workers of Spain	✓	✓	✓	✓	–	–	–	–	–	–	–	–	–	–	–	–	–	–	–	–	–	–	–
Spain	United Left	–		–	–	–	✓	✓	–	–	–	–	–	–	–	–	–	✓	–	–	✓	–	✓	✓
Sri Lanka	Communist Party of Sri Lanka	m		–	✓	✓	✓	✓	–	–	–	✓	✓	✓	✓	✓	–	✓	–	–	–	–	m	m
Sudan	Sudanese Communist Party	–		–	✓	–	✓	✓	–	✓	–	✓	✓	✓	–	–	–	✓	✓	✓	✓	✓	✓	✓
Sweden	Communist Party of Sweden	m	✓	✓	✓	✓	–	✓	–	✓	–	✓	✓	–	✓	✓	✓	–	✓	✓	✓	–	m	✓
Switzerland	Communist Party (Switzerland)	✓	✓																					
Syria	Syrian Communist Party (Bakdash)	–		–	✓	–	✓	✓	–	–	–	✓	✓	✓	✓	✓	✓	✓	✓	✓	✓	✓	✓	✓
Syria	Syrian Communist Party (Unified)	✓	✓	–	✓	✓	–	✓	–	✓	✓	✓	✓	✓	✓	✓	✓	✓	✓	✓	✓	✓	✓	✓
Tajikistan	Communist Party of Tajikistan	–		–	–	–	–	✓	–	m	–	–	✓	–	–	–	–	–	–	✓	–	m	–	m
Turkey	Communist Party of Turkey	✓	✓	✓	✓	✓	✓	–	–	–	✓	✓	✓	✓	✓	✓	✓	✓	✓	✓	✓	✓	✓	✓
Turkey	Communist Party	–		–	–	–	–	✓	–	✓	–	–	–	–	–	–	–	–	–	–	–	–	–	–
Turkey	Party of Labour	–		–	–	–	–	–	–	–	–	✓	✓	✓	–	–	–	o	o	–	o	✓	m	✓
Ukraine	Communist Party of Ukraine	✓	✓	✓	✓	✓	✓	✓	–	✓	–	–	✓	✓	✓	–	✓	✓	✓	✓	m	✓	✓	✓
Ukraine	Union of Communists of Ukraine	–	✓	–	✓	✓	✓	✓	–	✓	–	–	✓	✓	✓	–	✓	✓	✓	✓	✓	✓	✓	✓
United Kingdom	Communist Party of Britain	✓	✓	✓	✓	✓	✓	✓	–	✓	✓	✓	✓	✓	✓	✓	✓	✓	✓	✓	✓	✓	m	m
United Kingdom	New Communist Party of Britain	–		–	–	–	✓	✓	–	–	–	–	–	✓	–	–	–	–	✓	✓	✓	✓	–	✓
Uruguay	Communist Party of Uruguay	✓	✓	–	–	✓	–	✓	–	–	–	–	–	m	–	–	✓	–	–	–	–	m	–	–
USA	Communist Party USA	✓	✓	✓	–	✓	✓	✓	–	–	✓	✓	✓	✓	✓	✓	✓	✓	✓	✓	✓	✓	✓	✓
Venezuela	Communist Party of Venezuela	✓	✓	–	✓	–	✓	✓	–	m	–	–	–	✓	–	–	✓	✓	–	✓	m	–	✓	–
Vietnam	Communist Party of Vietnam	✓	✓	✓	✓	✓	✓	✓	✓	✓	✓	–	✓	✓	✓	✓	✓	✓	✓	✓	✓	✓	✓	✓

== Representatives ==
=== 9th International Meeting, 2007 ===
The 9th meeting was held in Minsk, Belarus, from 3 to 5 November 2007 and was hosted by the Communist Party of Belarus (KPB). It was attended by 154 representatives of 72 communist and workers' parties, representing 59 countries.

Country	Party	Leaders	Parliamentary representation	Type
Algeria	Algerian Party for Democracy and Socialism	Collective leadership Central Committee	0 / 462 2007 election	Participated
Armenia	Armenian Communist Party	Ruben Tovmasyan; General Secretary	0 / 131 2007 election	Participated
Australia	Communist Party of Australia	Hannah Middleton; General Secretary	0 / 150 2007 election	Participated
Azerbaijan	Communist Party of Azerbaijan	Telman Nurullayev; General Secretary	0 / 125 2005 election	Participated
Bahrain	National Liberation Front – Bahrain	Hasan Madau; General Secretary	0 / 40 2006 election	Participated
Belarus	Communist Party of Belarus	Igor Karpenko; General Secretary	6 / 110 2004 election	Participated
Belgium	Workers' Party of Belgium	Peter Mertens; President	0 / 150 2007 election	Participated
Brazil	Brazilian Communist Party	Ivan Pinheiro; General Secretary	0 / 513 2006 election	Participated
Brazil	Communist Party of Brazil	José Renato Rabelo; President	13 / 513 2006 election	Participated
Bulgaria	Communist Party of Bulgaria	Aleksandar Paunov; General Secretary	1 / 240 2005 election	Participated
Canada	Communist Party of Canada	Miguel Figueroa; General Secretary	0 / 308 2004 election	Participated
Chile	Communist Party of Chile	Lautaro Carmona Soto; General Secretary	0 / 120 2005 election	Participated
China	Chinese Communist Party	Hu Jintao; First Secretary	2,099 / 2,987 2002–2003 election	Participated
Cuba	Communist Party of Cuba	Fidel Castro; First Secretary	614 / 614 2008 election	Participated
Cyprus	Progressive Party of Working People	Demetris Christofias; General Secretary	18 / 56 2006 election	Participated
Czech Republic	Communist Party of Bohemia and Moravia	Vojtěch Filip; Chairman	26 / 200 2006 election	Participated
Denmark	Communist Party in Denmark	Betty Frydensbjerg Carlsson; Chairman	0 / 175 2007 election	Participated
Denmark	Communist Party of Denmark	Henrik Stamer Hedin; Chairman	4 / 175 2007 election	Participated
Finland	Communist Party of Finland	Yrjö Hakanen; Chairman	0 / 200 2007 election	Participated
Georgia	United Communist Party of Georgia	Panteleimon Giorgadze; General Secretary	Did not participate	Participated
Germany	German Communist Party	Bettina Jürgensen; Chairman	0 / 620 2005 election	Participated
United Kingdom	Communist Party of Britain	Robert Griffiths; General Secretary	0 / 646 2005 election	Participated
Greece	Communist Party of Greece	Aleka Papariga; General Secretary	22 / 300 2007 election	Participated
Hungary	Hungarian Communist Workers' Party	Gyula Thürmer; Chairman	0 / 386 2006 election	Participated
India	Communist Party of India	Ardhendu Bhushan Bardhan; General Secretary	10 / 545 2004 election	Participated
India	Communist Party of India (Marxist)	Prakash Karat; General Secretary	43 / 545 2004 election	Participated
Iran	Tudeh Party of Iran	Mohammad Omidvar; General Secretary	Illegal	Participated
Iraq	Iraqi Communist Party	Hamid Majid Mousa; General Secretary	0 / 275 December 2005 election	Participated
Ireland	Communist Party of Ireland	Eugene McCartan; General Secretary	0 / 166 2007 election	Participated
Ireland	Workers' Party (Ireland)	Seán Garland; President	0 / 166 2007 election	Participated
Israel	Communist Party of Israel	Collective leadership Central Committee	3 / 120 2006 election	Participated
Italy	Party of Italian Communists	Oliviero Diliberto; General Secretary	16 / 630 2006 election	Participated
Jordan	Jordanian Communist Party	Munir Hamarneh; General Secretary	0 / 150 2007 election	Participated
Korea, North	Workers' Party of Korea	Kim Jong-il; General Secretary	606 / 687 2003 election	Participated
Kyrgyzstan	Party of Communists of Kyrgyzstan	Iskhak Masaliyev; General Secretary	1 / 75 2005 election	Participated
Laos	Lao People's Revolutionary Party	Choummaly Sayasone; General Secretary	113 / 115 2006 election	Participated
Latvia	Socialist Party of Latvia	Alfrēds Rubiks; Chairman	4 / 100 2006 election	Participated
Lebanon	Lebanese Communist Party	Khaled Hadadi; General Secretary	0 / 128 2005 election	Participated
Lithuania	Socialist Party of Lithuania	Giedrius Petružis; Chairman	Did not participate	Participated
Luxembourg	Communist Party of Luxembourg	Ali Ruckert; General Secretary	0 / 60 2004 election	Participated
Macedonia	Communist Party of Macedonia		Did not participate	Participated
Mexico	Party of Mexican Communists	Pável Blanco Cabrera; General Secretary	0 / 500 2006 election	Participated
Mexico	Popular Socialist Party	Manuel Fernández Flores; President	Did not participate	Participated
Moldova	Party of Communists of the Republic of Moldova	Vladimir Voronin; First Secretary	56 / 101 2005 election	Participated
Nepal	Communist Party of Nepal (Unified Marxist–Leninist)	Jhala Nath Khanal; Chairman	71 / 205 1999 election	Participated
Norway	Communist Party of Norway	Zafer Gözet; Chairman	0 / 169 2005 election	Participated
Pakistan	Communist Party of Pakistan		0 / 342 2002 election	Participated
Philippines	Communist Party of the Philippines – 1930	Pedro Baguisa; General Secretary	Illegal	Participated
Poland	Communist Party of Poland	Józef Łachut; Chairman	0 / 460 2007 election	Participated
Portugal	Portuguese Communist Party	Jerónimo de Sousa; General Secretary	14 / 230 2005 election	Participated
Russia	Communist Party of the Russian Federation	Gennady Zyuganov; Chairman	52 / 450 2007 election	Participated
Russia	Russian Communist Workers' Party – Revolutionary Party of Communists	Viktor Tyulkin; Chairman	0 / 450 2007 election	Participated
Russia	Union of Communist Parties – Communist Party of the Soviet Union	Gennady Zyuganov; Chairman	Did not participate	Participated
Serbia	New Communist Party of Yugoslavia	Branko Kitanović; Executive Secretary	0 / 250 2007 election	Participated
Slovakia	Communist Party of Slovakia	Joseph Shevts; General Secretary	0 / 150 2006 election	Participated
Spain	Communist Party of Spain	Francisco Frutos; General Secretary	5 / 350 2004 election	Participated
Spain	United Left	Gaspar Llamazares; General Coordinator	5 / 350 2004 election	Participated
Spain	Communist Party of the Peoples of Spain	Carmelo Suárez; General Secretary	0 / 350 2004 election	Participated
Sri Lanka	Communist Party of Sri Lanka	D. E. W. Gunasekera; General Secretary	1 / 225 2004 election	Participated
Sudan	Sudanese Communist Party	Muhammad Ibrahim Nugud; General Secretary	Illegal	Participated
Sweden	Communist Party of Sweden	Victor Diaz de Filippi; Chairman	0 / 349 2006 election	Participated
Syria	Syrian Communist Party (Bakdash)	Ammar Bagdache; General Secretary	5 / 250 2007 election	Participated
Syria	Syrian Communist Party (Unified)	Hanin Nimir; General Secretary	3 / 250 2007 election	Participated
Turkey	Communist Party of Turkey	Collective leadership Central Committee	0 / 550 2007 election	Participated
Turkey	Party of Labour	Selma Gürkan; Chairman	0 / 550 2007 election	Observer
Ukraine	Union of Communists of Ukraine	Collective leadership Central Committee	0 / 450 2007 election	Participated
Uruguay	Communist Party of Uruguay	Eduardo Lorier; General Secretary	50 / 99 2004 election	Participated
United States	Communist Party USA	Sam Webb; Chairman	0 / 435 2006 election	Participated
Venezuela	Communist Party of Venezuela	Oscar Figuera; General Secretary	7 / 167 2005 election	Participated
Vietnam	Communist Party of Vietnam	Nông Đức Mạnh; General Secretary	458 / 500 2007 election	Participated

=== 10th International Meeting, 2008 ===
The 10th meeting was held in São Paulo, Brazil, from 21 to 23 November 2008 and was hosted by the Communist Party of Brazil (PCdoB). It was attended by delegations of 65 communist and workers' parties from 55 countries.

Country	Party	Leaders	Parliamentary representation	Type
Algeria	Algerian Party for Democracy and Socialism	Collective leadership Central Committee	0 / 462 2007 election	Participated
Argentina	Communist Party of Argentina	Patricio Echegaray; General Secretary	0 / 257 2007 election	Participated
Belarus	Communist Party of Belarus	Igor Karpenko; General Secretary	6 / 110 2004 election	Participated
Belgium	Workers' Party of Belgium	Peter Mertens; President	0 / 150 2007 election	Participated
Brazil	Brazilian Communist Party	Ivan Pinheiro; General Secretary	0 / 513 2006 election	Participated
Brazil	Communist Party of Brazil	José Renato Rabelo; President	13 / 513 2006 election	Participated
Bulgaria	Communist Party of Bulgaria	Aleksandar Paunov; General Secretary	1 / 240 2005 election	Participated
Canada	Communist Party of Canada	Miguel Figueroa; General Secretary	0 / 308 2004 election	Participated
Chile	Communist Party of Chile	Lautaro Carmona Soto; General Secretary	0 / 120 2005 election	Participated
China	Chinese Communist Party	Hu Jintao; First Secretary	2,099 / 2,987 2007–2008 election	Participated
Colombia	Colombian Communist Party	Jaime Caycedo Turriago; Chairman	0 / 162 2006 election	Participated
Cuba	Communist Party of Cuba	Fidel Castro; First Secretary	614 / 614 2008 election	Participated
Cyprus	Progressive Party of Working People	Demetris Christofias; General Secretary	18 / 56 2006 election	Participated
Czech Republic	Communist Party of Bohemia and Moravia	Vojtěch Filip; Chairman	26 / 200 2006 election	Participated
Denmark	Communist Party in Denmark	Betty Frydensbjerg Carlsson; Chairman	0 / 175 2007 election	Participated
Denmark	Communist Party of Denmark	Henrik Stamer Hedin; Chairman	4 / 175 2007 election	Participated
Ecuador	Communist Party of Ecuador	Winston Alarcón Elizalde; General Secretary	0 / 137 2006 election	Participated
Finland	Communist Party of Finland	Yrjö Hakanen; Chairman	0 / 200 2007 election	Participated
France	French Communist Party	Marie-George Buffet; National Secretary	7 / 577 2007 election	Participated
Georgia	Unified Communist Party of Georgia	Panteleimon Giorgadze; National Secretary	Did not participate	Participated
Germany	German Communist Party	Bettina Jürgensen; Chairman	0 / 620 2005 election	Participated
Great Britain	Communist Party of Britain	Robert Griffiths; General Secretary	0 / 646 2005 election	Participated
Greece	Communist Party of Greece	Aleka Papariga; General Secretary	22 / 300 2007 election	Participated
Hungary	Hungarian Communist Workers' Party	Gyula Thürmer; Chairman	0 / 386 2006 election	Participated
India	Communist Party of India	Ardhendu Bhushan Bardhan; General Secretary	10 / 545 2004 election	Participated
India	Communist Party of India (Marxist)	Prakash Karat; General Secretary	43 / 545 2004 election	Participated
Iran	Tudeh Party of Iran	Mohammad Omidvar; General Secretary	Illegal	Participated
Iraq	Iraqi Communist Party	Hamid Majid Mousa; General Secretary	0 / 275 December 2005 election	Participated
Ireland	Communist Party of Ireland	Eugene McCartan; General Secretary	0 / 166 2007 election	Participated
Ireland	Workers' Party (Ireland)	Mick Finnegan; President	0 / 166 2007 election	Participated
Italy	Communist Refoundation Party	Paolo Ferrero; General Secretary	0 / 630 2008 election	Participated
Italy	Party of Italian Communists	Oliviero Diliberto; General Secretary	0 / 630 2008 election	Participated
Korea, North	Workers' Party of Korea	Kim Jong-il; General Secretary	606 / 687 2003 election	Participated
Kyrgyzstan	Party of Communists of Kyrgyzstan	Iskhak Masaliyev; General Secretary	1 / 75 2005 election	Participated
Laos	Lao People's Revolutionary Party	Choummaly Sayasone; General Secretary	113 / 115 2006 election	Participated
Latvia	Socialist Party of Latvia	Alfrēds Rubiks; Chairman	4 / 100 2006 election	Participated
Lebanon	Lebanese Communist Party	Khaled Hadadi; General Secretary	0 / 128 2006 election	Participated
Luxembourg	Communist Party of Luxembourg	Ali Ruckert; General Secretary	0 / 60 2004 election	Participated
Mexico	Party of Mexican Communists	Pável Blanco Cabrera; General Secretary	0 / 500 2006 election	Participated
Nepal	Communist Party of Nepal (Unified Marxist–Leninist)	Jhala Nath Khanal; Chairman	109 / 601 2008 election	Participated
Netherlands	New Communist Party of the Netherlands	Job Pruijser; Chairman	0 / 150 2006 election	Participated
Norway	Communist Party of Norway	Zafer Gözet; Chairman	0 / 169 2005 election	Participated
Palestine	Palestinian People's Party	Bassam as-Salhi; General Secretary	0 / 272 2006 election	Participated
Palestine	Palestinian Communist Party		Did not participate	Participated
Panama	People's Party of Panama	Rubén Dario Sousa Batista; General Secretary	Not recognized	Participated
Paraguay	Communist Party of Paraguay	Najeeb Amado; General Secretary	Did not participate	Participated
Peru	Communist Party of Peru – Red Fatherland	Alberto Moreno; General Secretary	Did not participate	Participated
Peru	Peruvian Communist Party	Roberto De La Cruz Huaman; General Secretary	0 / 130 2006 election	Participated
Portugal	Portuguese Communist Party	Jerónimo de Sousa; General Secretary	14 / 230 2005 election	Participated
Russia	Communist Party of the Russian Federation	Gennady Zyuganov; Chairman	52 / 450 2007 election	Participated
Russia	Russian Communist Workers' Party – Revolutionary Party of Communists	Viktor Tyulkin; Chairman	0 / 450 2007 election	Participated
Russia	Union of Communist Parties – Communist Party of the Soviet Union	Gennady Zyuganov; Chairman	Did not participate	Participated
Serbia	New Communist Party of Yugoslavia	Branko Kitanović; Executive Secretary	0 / 250 2008 election	Participated
South Africa	South African Communist Party	Blade Nzimande; General Secretary	0 / 400 2004 election	Participated
Spain	Communist Party of the People of Spain	Carmelo Suárez; General Secretary	0 / 350 2004 election	Participated
Sri Lanka	Communist Party of Sri Lanka	D. E. W. Gunasekera; General Secretary	1 / 225 2004 election	Participated
Syria	Syrian Communist Party (Bakdash)	Ammar Bagdache; General Secretary	5 / 250 2007 election	Participated
Syria	Syrian Communist Party (Unified)	Hanin Nimir; General Secretary	3 / 250 2007 election	Participated
Sweden	Communist Party of Sweden	Victor Diaz de Filippi; Chairman	0 / 349 2006 election	Participated
Turkey	Communist Party of Turkey	Collective leadership Central Committee	0 / 550 2007 election	Participated
Ukraine	Union of Communists of Ukraine	Collective leadership Central Committee	0 / 450 2007 election	Participated
Uruguay	Communist Party of Uruguay	Eduardo Lorier; General Secretary	50 / 99 2004 election	Participated
United States	Communist Party USA	Sam Webb; Chairman	0 / 435 2008 election	Participated
Venezuela	Communist Party of Venezuela	Oscar Figuera; General Secretary	7 / 167 2005 election	Participated
Vietnam	Communist Party of Vietnam	Nông Đức Mạnh; General Secretary	458 / 500 2007 election	Participated

=== 11th International Meeting, 2009 ===
The 11th meeting was held in New Delhi, India, from 20 to 22 November 2009 and was hosted by both the Communist Party of India (Marxist) and the Communist Party of India. It was attended by 89 participants representing 57 communist and workers' parties and 48 countries.

Country	Party	Leaders	Parliamentary representation	Type
Argentina	Communist Party of Argentina	Patricio Echegaray; General Secretary	0 / 257 2007 election	Participated
Australia	Communist Party of Australia	Hannah Middleton; General Secretary	0 / 150 2007 election	Participated
Bangladesh	Workers Party of Bangladesh	Syed Abu Zafar; General Secretary	2 / 300 2008 election	Participated
Belgium	Workers' Party of Belgium	Peter Mertens; President	0 / 150 2007 election	Participated
Bolivia	Communist Party of Bolivia		Illegal	Sent message
Brazil	Brazilian Communist Party	Ivan Pinheiro; General Secretary	0 / 513 2006 election	Participated
Brazil	Communist Party of Brazil	José Renato Rabelo; President	13 / 513 2006 election	Participated
Canada	Communist Party of Canada	Miguel Figueroa; General Secretary	0 / 308 2008 election	Participated
China	Chinese Communist Party	Hu Jintao; First Secretary	2,099 / 2,987 2007–2008 election	Participated
Cuba	Communist Party of Cuba	Fidel Castro; First Secretary	614 / 614 2008 election	Participated
Cyprus	Progressive Party of Working People	Andros Kyprianou; General Secretary	18 / 56 2006 election	Participated
Czech Republic	Communist Party of Bohemia and Moravia	Vojtěch Filip; Chairman	26 / 200 2006 election	Participated
Denmark	Communist Party in Denmark	Betty Frydensbjerg Carlsson; Chairman	0 / 175 2007 election	Participated
Denmark	Communist Party of Denmark	Henrik Stamer Hedin; Chairman	4 / 175 2007 election	Participated
Finland	Communist Party of Finland	Yrjö Hakanen; Chairman	0 / 200 2007 election	Participated
France	French Communist Party	Marie-George Buffet; National Secretary	7 / 577 2007 election	Participated
Germany	German Communist Party	Bettina Jürgensen; Chairman	0 / 620 2009 election	Participated
Great Britain	Communist Party of Britain	Robert Griffiths; General Secretary	0 / 650 2006 election	Participated
Greece	Communist Party of Greece	Aleka Papariga; General Secretary	22 / 300 2007 election	Participated
Hungary	Hungarian Communist Workers' Party	Gyula Thürmer; Chairman	0 / 386 2006 election	Participated
India	Communist Party of India	Ardhendu Bhushan Bardhan; General Secretary	4 / 545 2009 election	Participated
India	Communist Party of India (Marxist)	Prakash Karat; General Secretary	16 / 545 2009 election	Participated
Iran	Tudeh Party of Iran	Mohammad Omidvar; General Secretary	Illegal	Participated
Iraq	Iraqi Communist Party	Hamid Majid Mousa; General Secretary	0 / 325 December 2005 election	Participated
Ireland	Communist Party of Ireland	Eugene McCartan; General Secretary	0 / 166 2007 election	Participated
Ireland	Workers' Party (Ireland)	Mick Finnegan; President	0 / 166 2007 election	Participated
Israel	Communist Party of Israel	Collective leadership Central Committee	4 / 120 2009 election	Participated
Italy	Communist Refoundation Party	Paolo Ferrero; General Secretary	0 / 630 2008 election	Participated
Italy	Party of Italian Communists	Oliviero Diliberto; General Secretary	0 / 630 2008 election	Participated
Korea, North	Workers' Party of Korea	Kim Jong-il; General Secretary	606 / 687 2009 election	Participated
Kyrgyzstan	Party of Communists of Kyrgyzstan	Iskhak Masaliyev; General Secretary	1 / 75 2005 election	Participated
Laos	Lao People's Revolutionary Party	Choummaly Sayasone; General Secretary	113 / 115 2006 election	Participated
Latvia	Socialist Party of Latvia	Alfrēds Rubiks; Chairman	3 / 100 2006 election	Participated
Lebanon	Lebanese Communist Party	Khaled Hadadi; General Secretary	0 / 128 2009 election	Participated
Luxembourg	Communist Party of Luxembourg	Ali Ruckert; General Secretary	0 / 60 2009 election	Participated
Mexico	Party of Mexican Communists	Pável Blanco Cabrera; General Secretary	0 / 500 2006 election	Participated
Nepal	Communist Party of Nepal (Unified Marxist–Leninist)	Jhala Nath Khanal; Chairman	109 / 601 2008 election	Participated
Netherlands	New Communist Party of the Netherlands	Job Pruijser; Chairman	0 / 150 2006 election	Participated
Norway	Communist Party of Norway	Zafer Gözet; Chairman	0 / 169 2009 election	Participated
Palestine	Palestinian People's Party	Bassam as-Salhi; General Secretary	0 / 272 2006 election	Participated
Palestine	Palestinian Communist Party		Did not participate	Participated
Peru	Peruvian Communist Party	Roberto De La Cruz Huaman; General Secretary	Did not participate	Participated
Portugal	Portuguese Communist Party	Jerónimo de Sousa; General Secretary	15 / 230 2009 election	Participated
Russia	Communist Party of the Russian Federation	Gennady Zyuganov; Chairman	52 / 450 2007 election	Participated
Russia	Russian Communist Workers' Party – Revolutionary Party of Communists	Viktor Tyulkin; Chairman	0 / 450 2007 election	Participated
Russia	Union of Communist Parties – Communist Party of the Soviet Union	Gennady Zyuganov; Chairman	Did not participate	Participated
Serbia	New Communist Party of Yugoslavia	Branko Kitanović; Executive Secretary	0 / 250 2008 election	Participated
South Africa	South African Communist Party	Blade Nzimande; General Secretary	0 / 400 2009 election	Participated
Spain	Communist Party of Spain	José Luis Centella; General Secretary	2 / 350 2008 election	Participated
Spain	Communist Party of the Peoples of Spain	Carmelo Suárez; General Secretary	0 / 350 2008 election	Participated
Sri Lanka	Communist Party of Sri Lanka	D. E. W. Gunasekera; General Secretary	1 / 225 2004 election	Participated
Syria	Syrian Communist Party (Bakdash)	Ammar Bagdache; General Secretary	5 / 250 2007 election	Participated
Syria	Syrian Communist Party (Unified)	Hanin Nimir; General Secretary	3 / 250 2007 election	Participated
Sweden	Communist Party of Sweden	Victor Diaz de Filippi; Chairman	0 / 349 2006 election	Participated
Turkey	Communist Party of Turkey	Collective leadership Central Committee	0 / 550 2007 election	Participated
United States	Communist Party USA	Sam Webb; Chairman	0 / 435 2008 election	Participated
Vietnam	Communist Party of Vietnam	Nông Đức Mạnh; General Secretary	458 / 500 2007 election	Participated

=== 12th International Meeting, 2010 ===
The 13th meeting was held in Johannesburg, South Africa, from 3 to 5 December 2010 and was hosted by the South African Communist Party.

Country	Party	Leaders	Parliamentary representation	Type
Argentina	Communist Party of Argentina	Patricio Echegaray; General Secretary	0 / 257 2007 election	Participated
Australia	Communist Party of Australia	Hannah Middleton; General Secretary	0 / 150 2007	Participated
Azerbaijan	Communist Party of Azerbaijan	Telman Nurullayev; General Secretary	0 / 125 2010	Participated
Bangladesh	Workers Party of Bangladesh	Syed Abu Zafar; General Secretary	2 / 300 2008 election	Participated
Belarus	Communist Party of Belarus	Igor Karpenko; General Secretary	6 / 110 2008 election	Participated
Belgium	Workers' Party of Belgium	Peter Mertens; President	0 / 150 2010 election	Participated
Brazil	Brazilian Communist Party	Ivan Pinheiro; General Secretary	0 / 513 2010 election	Participated
Brazil	Communist Party of Brazil	José Renato Rabelo; President	15 / 513 2010 election	Participated
Bulgaria	Communist Party of Bulgaria	Aleksandar Paunov; General Secretary	1 / 240 2009 election	Participated
Canada	Communist Party of Canada	Miguel Figueroa; General Secretary	0 / 308 2008 election	Participated
China	Chinese Communist Party	Hu Jintao; First Secretary	2,099 / 2,987 2007–2008 election	Participated
Cuba	Communist Party of Cuba	Fidel Castro; First Secretary	614 / 614 2008 election	Participated
Cyprus	Progressive Party of Working People	Andros Kyprianou; General Secretary	18 / 56 2006 election	Participated
Czech Republic	Communist Party of Bohemia and Moravia	Vojtěch Filip; Chairman	26 / 200 2010 election	Participated
Denmark	Communist Party in Denmark	Betty Frydensbjerg Carlsson; Chairman	0 / 175 2007 election	Participated
Denmark	Communist Party of Denmark	Henrik Stamer Hedin; Chairman	4 / 175 2007 election	Participated
Finland	Communist Party of Finland	Yrjö Hakanen; Chairman	0 / 200 2007 election	Participated
France	French Communist Party	Pierre Laurent; National Secretary	7 / 577 2007 election	Participated
Germany	German Communist Party	Bettina Jürgensen; General Secretary	0 / 620 2009 election	Participated
Great Britain	Communist Party of Britain	Robert Griffiths; General Secretary	0 / 650 2010 election	Participated
Greece	Communist Party of Greece	Aleka Papariga; General Secretary	22 / 300 2007 election	Participated
Hungary	Hungarian Communist Workers' Party	Gyula Thürmer; Chairman	0 / 386 2010 election	Participated
India	Communist Party of India	Ardhendu Bhushan Bardhan; General Secretary	4 / 545 2009 election	Participated
India	Communist Party of India (Marxist)	Prakash Karat; General Secretary	16 / 545 2009 election	Participated
Iraq	Iraqi Communist Party	Hamid Majid Mousa; General Secretary	0 / 325 2010 election	Participated
Ireland	Communist Party of Ireland	Eugene McCartan; General Secretary	0 / 166 2007 election	Participated
Ireland	Workers' Party (Ireland)	Mick Finnegan; President	0 / 166 2007 election	Participated
Israel	Communist Party of Israel	Collective leadership Central Committee	4 / 120 2009 election	Participated
Italy	Communist Refoundation Party	Paolo Ferrero; General Secretary	0 / 630 2008 election	Participated
Italy	Party of Italian Communists	Oliviero Diliberto; General Secretary	0 / 630 2008 election	Participated
Lebanon	Lebanese Communist Party	Khaled Hadadi; General Secretary	0 / 128 2009 election	Participated
Luxembourg	Communist Party of Luxembourg	Ali Ruckert; General Secretary	0 / 60 2009 election	Participated
Nepal	Communist Party of Nepal (Unified Marxist–Leninist)	Jhala Nath Khanal; Chairman	109 / 601 2008 election	Participated
Netherlands	New Communist Party of the Netherlands	Job Pruijser; Chairman	0 / 150 2010 election	Participated
Norway	Communist Party of Norway	Svend Haakon Jacobsen; Chairman	0 / 169 2009 election	Participated
Palestine	Palestinian People's Party	Bassam as-Salhi; General Secretary	0 / 272 2006 election	Participated
Palestine	Palestinian Communist Party		Did not participate	Participated
Peru	Peruvian Communist Party	Roberto De La Cruz Huaman; General Secretary	Did not participate	Participated
Portugal	Portuguese Communist Party	Jerónimo de Sousa; General Secretary	15 / 230 2009 election	Participated
Russia	Communist Party of the Russian Federation	Gennady Zyuganov; Chairman	52 / 450 2007 election	Participated
Russia	Russian Communist Workers' Party – Revolutionary Party of Communists	Viktor Tyulkin; Chairman	0 / 450 2007 election	Participated
Russia	Communist Party of the Soviet Union	Sergey Alexandrov; First Secretary	Did not participate	Participated
Serbia	New Communist Party of Yugoslavia	Branko Kitanović; Executive Secretary	0 / 250 2008 election	Participated
South Africa	South African Communist Party	Blade Nzimande; General Secretary	0 / 400 2009 election	Participated
Spain	Communist Party of Spain	José Luis Centella; General Secretary	2 / 350 2008 election	Participated
Spain	Communist Party of the Peoples of Spain	Carmelo Suárez; General Secretary	0 / 350 2008 election	Participated
Sri Lanka	Communist Party of Sri Lanka	D. E. W. Gunasekera; General Secretary	2 / 225 2010 election	Participated
Syria	Syrian Communist Party (Bakdash)	Ammar Bagdache; General Secretary	5 / 250 2007 election	Participated
Syria	Syrian Communist Party (Unified)	Hanin Nimir; General Secretary	3 / 250 2007 election	Participated
Turkey	Communist Party of Turkey	Collective leadership Central Committee	0 / 550 2007 election	Participated
Ukraine	Communist Party of Ukraine	Petro Symonenko; General Secretary	27 / 450 2007 election	Participated
Ukraine	Union of Communists of Ukraine	Collective leadership Central Committee	0 / 450 2007 election	Participated
United States	Communist Party USA	Sam Webb; Chairman	0 / 435 2010 election	Participated
Vietnam	Communist Party of Vietnam	Nông Đức Mạnh; General Secretary	458 / 500 2007 election	Participated

=== 13th International Meeting, 2011 ===
The 13th meeting was held in Athens, Greece, from 9 to 11 December 2011 and was hosted by the Communist Party of Greece (KKE). Under the motto "Socialism is the future!", it was attended by 80 parties, while additional eight parties sent a message.

Countries with parties that participated in the 13th IMCWP (2011) appear in red on this map.

Country	Party	Leaders	Parliamentary representation	Type
Albania	Communist Party of Albania	Hysni Milloshi; First Secretary	0 / 140 2009 election	Participated
Algeria	Algerian Party for Democracy and Socialism	Collective leadership Central Committee	0 / 462 2007 election	Participated
Argentina	Communist Party of Argentina	Patricio Echegaray; General Secretary	0 / 257 2011 election	Sent message
Armenia	Armenian Communist Party	Ruben Tovmasyan; General Secretary	0 / 131 2007 election	Participated
Australia	Communist Party of Australia	Hannah Middleton; General Secretary	0 / 150 2007	Participated
Azerbaijan	Communist Party of Azerbaijan	Telman Nurullayev; General Secretary	0 / 125 2010	Participated
Bangladesh	Communist Party of Bangladesh	Mujahidul Islam Selim; General Secretary	0 / 300 2008 election	Participated
Bangladesh	Workers Party of Bangladesh	Syed Abu Zafar; General Secretary	2 / 300 2008 election	Participated
Belarus	Communist Party of Belarus	Igor Karpenko; General Secretary	6 / 110 2008 election	Participated
Belgium	Communist Party	Pierre Beauvois; President	0 / 150 2010 election	Sent message
Belgium	Workers' Party of Belgium	Peter Mertens; President	0 / 150 2010 election	Participated
Bolivia	Communist Party of Bolivia		Illegal	Sent message
Brazil	Brazilian Communist Party	Ivan Pinheiro; General Secretary	0 / 513 2010 election	Participated
Brazil	Communist Party of Brazil	José Renato Rabelo; President	15 / 513 2010 election	Participated
Bulgaria	Communist Party of Bulgaria	Aleksandar Paunov; General Secretary	1 / 240 2009 election	Participated
Bulgaria	Party of the Bulgarian Communists	Mincho Minchev Petrov; Secretary of Political Affairs	0 / 240 2009 election	Participated
Canada	Communist Party of Canada	Miguel Figueroa; General Secretary	0 / 308 2011 election	Participated
Croatia	Socialist Labour Party of Croatia	Ivan Plješa; President	0 / 151 2011 election	Participated
Cuba	Communist Party of Cuba	Raúl Castro; First Secretary	614 / 614 2008 election	Participated
Cyprus	Progressive Party of Working People	Andros Kyprianou; General Secretary	19 / 56 2011 election	Participated
Czech Republic	Communist Party of Bohemia and Moravia	Vojtěch Filip; Chairman	26 / 200 2010 election	Participated
Denmark	Communist Party in Denmark	Betty Frydensbjerg Carlsson; Chairman	0 / 179 2011 election	Participated
Denmark	Communist Party of Denmark	Henrik Stamer Hedin; Chairman	12 / 179 2011 election	Participated
Egypt	Egyptian Communist Party	Collective leadership Central Committee	0 / 518 2010 election	Participated
Finland	Communist Party of Finland	Yrjö Hakanen; Chairman	0 / 200 2011 election	Participated
France	French Communist Party	Pierre Laurent; National Secretary	15 / 577 2007 election	Participated
Georgia	United Communist Party of Georgia	Nugzar Shalvovich Avaliani; National Secretary	0 / 150 2008 election	Participated
Germany	German Communist Party	Bettina Jürgensen; General Secretary	0 / 620 2009 election	Participated
Great Britain	Communist Party of Britain	Robert Griffiths; General Secretary	0 / 650 2010 election	Participated
Great Britain	New Communist Party of Britain	Andy Brooks; General Secretary	0 / 650 2010 election	Participated
Greece	Communist Party of Greece	Aleka Papariga; General Secretary	22 / 300 2007 election	Participated
Guyana	People's Progressive Party	Donald Ramotar; President	32 / 65 2011 election	Participated
Hungary	Hungarian Communist Workers' Party	Gyula Thürmer; Chairman	0 / 386 2010 election	Participated
India	Communist Party of India	Ardhendu Bhushan Bardhan; General Secretary	4 / 545 2009 election	Participated
India	Communist Party of India (Marxist)	Prakash Karat; General Secretary	16 / 545 2009 election	Participated
Korea, North	Workers' Party of Korea	Kim Jong-il; General Secretary	606 / 687 2009 election	Participated
Iran	Tudeh Party of Iran	Mohammad Omidvar; General Secretary	Illegal	Sent message
Iraq	Iraqi Communist Party	Hamid Majid Mousa; General Secretary	0 / 325 2010 election	Sent message
Ireland	Communist Party of Ireland	Eugene McCartan; General Secretary	0 / 166 2011 election	Participated
Ireland	Workers' Party (Ireland)	Mick Finnegan; President	0 / 166 2011 election	Participated
Italy	Communist Refoundation Party	Paolo Ferrero; General Secretary	0 / 630 2008 election	Participated
Italy	Party of Italian Communists	Oliviero Diliberto; General Secretary	0 / 630 2008 election	Participated
Jordan	Jordanian Communist Party	Munir Hamarneh; General Secretary	0 / 150 2010 election	Participated
Laos	Lao People's Revolutionary Party	Choummaly Sayasone; General Secretary	128 / 132 2011 election	Participated
Latvia	Socialist Party of Latvia	Alfrēds Rubiks; Chairman	3 / 100 2010 election	Participated
Lebanon	Lebanese Communist Party	Khaled Hadadi; General Secretary	0 / 128 2009 election	Participated
Lithuania	Socialist People's Front	Algirdas Paleckis; Chairman	0 / 141 2008 election	Participated
Luxembourg	Communist Party of Luxembourg	Ali Ruckert; General Secretary	0 / 60 2009 election	Participated
Macedonia	Communist Party of Macedonia		Did not participate	Participated
Malta	Communist Party of Malta	Victor Degiovanni; General Secretary	0 / 69 2008 election	Sent message
Mexico	Communist Party of Mexico	Pável Blanco Cabrera; General Secretary	0 / 500 2008 election	Participated
Mexico	Popular Socialist Party of Mexico	Cuauhtémoc Amezcua Dromundo; General Secretary	Not recognized	Sent message
Nepal	Communist Party of Nepal (Unified Marxist–Leninist)	Jhala Nath Khanal; Chairman	109 / 601 2008 election	Sent message
Netherlands	New Communist Party of the Netherlands	Job Pruijser; Chairman	0 / 150 2010 election	Participated
Norway	Communist Party of Norway	Svend Haakon Jacobsen; Chairman	0 / 169 2009 election	Participated
Pakistan	Communist Party of Pakistan	Imdad Qazi; General Secretary	0 / 272 2008 election	Participated
Palestine	Palestinian People's Party	Bassam as-Salhi; General Secretary	0 / 272 2006 election	Participated
Palestine	Palestinian Communist Party		Did not participate	Participated
Paraguay	Communist Party of Paraguay	Najeeb Amado; General Secretary	Did not participate	Participated
Peru	Communist Party of Peru – Red Fatherland	Alberto Moreno; General Secretary	Did not participate	Participated
Peru	Peruvian Communist Party	Roberto De La Cruz Huaman; General Secretary	0 / 130 2011 election	Participated
Philippines	Communist Party of the Philippines – 1930	Antonio E. Paris; General Secretary	Illegal	Sent message
Poland	Communist Party of Poland	Krzysztof Szwej; Chairman	0 / 460 2011 election	Participated
Portugal	Portuguese Communist Party	Jerónimo de Sousa; General Secretary	14 / 230 2011 election	Participated
Romania	Romanian Communist Party		Not recognized	Participated
Russia	Communist Party of the Russian Federation	Gennady Zyuganov; Chairman	92 / 450 2011 election	Participated
Russia	Russian Communist Workers' Party – Revolutionary Party of Communists	Viktor Tyulkin; Chairman	0 / 450 2011 election	Participated
Russia	Communist Party of the Soviet Union	Sergey Alexandrov; First Secretary	Did not participate	Participated
Russia	Union of Communist Parties – Communist Party of the Soviet Union	Gennady Zyuganov; Chairman	Did not participate	Participated
Serbia	New Communist Party of Yugoslavia	Branko Kitanović; Executive Secretary	0 / 250 2008 election	Participated
Serbia	Communists of Serbia	Svetozar Markanović; President	0 / 250 2008 election	Participated
South Africa	South African Communist Party	Blade Nzimande; General Secretary	0 / 400 2009 election	Participated
Spain	Communist Party of Spain	José Luis Centella; General Secretary	6 / 350 2011 election	Participated
Spain	Party of the Communists of Catalonia	Collective leadership Central Committee	0 / 350 2011 election	Participated
Spain	Communist Party of the Peoples of Spain	Carmelo Suárez; General Secretary	0 / 350 2011 election	Participated
Sri Lanka	Communist Party of Sri Lanka	D. E. W. Gunasekera; General Secretary	2 / 225 2010 election	Participated
Sudan	Sudanese Communist Party	Muhammad Mukhtar Al-Khatib; General Secretary	0 / 450 2010 election	Participated
Sweden	Communist Party of Sweden	Victor Diaz de Filippi; Chairman	0 / 349 2010 election	Participated
Syria	Syrian Communist Party (Bakdash)	Ammar Bagdache; General Secretary	5 / 250 2007 election	Participated
Syria	Syrian Communist Party (Unified)	Hanin Nimir; General Secretary	3 / 250 2007 election	Participated
Turkey	Communist Party of Turkey	Collective leadership Central Committee	0 / 550 2011 election	Participated
Turkey	Labour Party	Selma Gürkan; General Secretary	0 / 550 2011 election	Participated
Ukraine	Communist Party of Ukraine	Petro Symonenko; General Secretary	32 / 450 2007 election	Participated
Ukraine	Union of Communists of Ukraine	Collective leadership Central Committee	27 / 450 2007 election	Participated
Uruguay	Communist Party of Uruguay	Eduardo Lorier; General Secretary	50 / 99 2009 election	Sent message
United States	Communist Party USA	Sam Webb; Chairman	0 / 435 2010 election	Participated
Venezuela	Communist Party of Venezuela	Oscar Figuera; General Secretary	3 / 156 2010 election	Participated
Vietnam	Communist Party of Vietnam	Nguyễn Phú Trọng; General Secretary	458 / 500 2011 election	Participated

=== 14th International Meeting, 2012 ===
The 14th International Meeting of Communist and Workers' Parties took place from 22 to 25 November 2012 in Beirut, Lebanon.

Country	Party	Leaders	Parliamentary representation	Type
Algeria	Algerian Party for Democracy and Socialism	Collective leadership Central Committee	0 / 462 2012 election	Participated
Australia	Communist Party of Australia	Bob Briton; General Secretary	0 / 150 2010 election	Sent message
Azerbaijan	Communist Party of Azerbaijan	Telman Nurullayev; General Secretary	0 / 125 2010 election	Participated
Bahrain	Progressive Democratic Tribune	Hassan Madan; General Secretary	0 / 40 2014 election	Participated
Bangladesh	Communist Party of Bangladesh	Mujahidul Islam Selim; General Secretary	0 / 300 2014 election	Participated
Bangladesh	Workers Party of Bangladesh	Syed Abu Zafar; General Secretary	6 / 300 2014 election	Participated
Belarus	Communist Party of Belarus	Igor Karpenko; General Secretary	3 / 110 2012 election	Participated
Belgium	Workers' Party of Belgium	Peter Mertens; President	2 / 150 2014 election	Participated
Brazil	Brazilian Communist Party	Ivan Pinheiro; General Secretary	0 / 513 2014 election	Participated
Brazil	Communist Party of Brazil	José Renato Rabelo; President	10 / 513 2014 election	Participated
Canada	Communist Party of Canada	Miguel Figueroa; General Secretary	0 / 308 2011 election	Participated
Chile	Communist Party of Chile	Guillermo Teillier; President	6 / 120 2013 election	Sent message
China	Chinese Communist Party	Xi Jinping; General Secretary	2,099 / 2,987 2007–2008 election	Participated
Croatia	Socialist Labour Party of Croatia	Ivan Plješa; President	0 / 151 2011 election	Participated
Cuba	Communist Party of Cuba	Raúl Castro; First Secretary	612 / 612 2013 election	Participated
Cyprus	Progressive Party of Working People	Andros Kyprianou; General Secretary	19 / 56 2011 election	Participated
Czech Republic	Communist Party of Bohemia and Moravia	Vojtěch Filip; Chairman	33 / 200 2013 election	Participated
Denmark	Communist Party in Denmark	Betty Frydensbjerg Carlsson; Chairman	0 / 179 2011 election	Participated
Denmark	Communist Party of Denmark	Henrik Stamer Hedin; Chairman	0 / 179 2011 election	Participated
Egypt	Egyptian Communist Party	Collective leadership Central Committee	0 / 508 2011–2012 election	Participated
Finland	Communist Party of Finland	Yrjö Hakanen; Chairman	0 / 200 2011 election	Participated
France	French Communist Party	Pierre Laurent; National Secretary	7 / 577 2012 election	Participated
Germany	German Communist Party	Bettina Jürgensen; General Secretary	0 / 631 2013 election	Participated
Great Britain	Communist Party of Britain	Robert Griffiths; General Secretary	0 / 650 2010 election	Participated
Greece	Communist Party of Greece	Dimitris Koutsoumpas; General Secretary	12 / 300 June 2012 election	Participated
Hungary	Hungarian Workers' Party	Gyula Thürmer; Chairman	0 / 199 2014 election	Participated
India	Communist Party of India	Suravaram Sudhakar Reddy; General Secretary	1 / 543 2014 election	Sent message
India	Communist Party of India (Marxist)	Prakash Karat; General Secretary	7 / 543 2014 election	Participated
Iran	Tudeh Party of Iran	Ali Khavari; General Secretary	Illegal	Sent message
Iraq	Iraqi Communist Party	Hamid Majid Mousa; General Secretary	1 / 328 2014 election	Participated
Iraq	Kurdistan Communist Party – Iraq	Kamal Shakir; General Secretary	0 / 325 2014 election	Participated
Ireland	Communist Party of Ireland	Eugene McCartan; General Secretary	0 / 166 2011 election	Participated
Ireland	Workers' Party (Ireland)	Mick Finnegan; President	0 / 166 2011 election	Participated
Italy	Communist Refoundation Party	Paolo Ferrero; General Secretary	0 / 630 2013 election	Participated
Italy	Party of Italian Communists	Oliviero Diliberto; General Secretary	0 / 630 2013 election	Participated
Jordan	Jordanian Communist Party	Munir Hamarneh; General Secretary	0 / 150 2013 election	Participated
Lebanon	Lebanese Communist Party	Khaled Hadadi; General Secretary	0 / 128 2009 election	Participated
Luxembourg	Communist Party of Luxembourg	Ali Ruckert; General Secretary	0 / 60 2013 election	Sent message
Malta	Communist Party of Malta	Victor Degiovanni; General Secretary	0 / 69 2013 election	Sent message
Mexico	Communist Party of Mexico	Pável Blanco Cabrera; General Secretary	0 / 500 2012 election	Participated
Nepal	Communist Party of Nepal (Unified Marxist–Leninist)	Jhala Nath Khanal; Chairman	175 / 601 2013 election	Participated
Netherlands	New Communist Party of the Netherlands	Job Pruijser; Chairman	0 / 150 2012 election	Participated
Norway	Communist Party of Norway	Jørgen Hovde; Chairman	0 / 169 2013 election	Participated
Pakistan	Communist Party of Pakistan	Imdad Qazi; General Secretary	0 / 272 2013 election	Sent message
Palestine	Palestinian People's Party	Bassam as-Salhi; General Secretary	0 / 272 2006 election	Participated
Palestine	Palestinian Communist Party		Did not participate	Participated
Portugal	Portuguese Communist Party	Jerónimo de Sousa; General Secretary	14 / 230 2011 election	Participated
Russia	Communist Party of the Russian Federation	Gennady Zyuganov; Chairman	92 / 450 2011 election	Participated
Russia	Russian Communist Workers' Party of the Communist Party of the Soviet Union	Viktor Tyulkin; Chairman	0 / 450 2011 election	Participated
Russia	Communist Party of the Soviet Union	Sergey Alexandrov; First Secretary	Did not participate	Participated
Serbia	New Communist Party of Yugoslavia	Batrić Mijović; Executive Secretary	0 / 250 2012 election	Participated
South Africa	South African Communist Party	Blade Nzimande; General Secretary	0 / 400 2014 election	Participated
Spain	Communist Party of Spain	José Luis Centella; General Secretary	6 / 350 2011 election	Participated
Spain	Party of the Communists of Catalonia	Joan Josep Nuet; General Secretary	1 / 350 2011 election	Participated
Spain	Communist Party of the Peoples of Spain	Carmelo Suárez; General Secretary	0 / 350 2011 election	Participated
Sri Lanka	Communist Party of Sri Lanka	D. E. W. Gunasekera; General Secretary	2 / 225 2010 election	Participated
Sudan	Sudanese Communist Party	Muhammad Mukhtar Al-Khatib; General Secretary	0 / 450 2010 election	Participated
Sweden	Communist Party of Sweden	Victor Diaz de Filippi; Chairman	0 / 349 2014 election	Participated
Syria	Syrian Communist Party (Bakdash)	Ammar Bagdache; General Secretary	8 / 250 2012 election	Participated
Syria	Syrian Communist Party (Unified)	Hanin Nimir; General Secretary	3 / 250 2012 election	Participated
Tajikistan	Communist Party of Tajikistan	Shodi Shabdolov; General Secretary	2 / 63 2010 election	Participated
Turkey	Communist Party of Turkey	Collective leadership Central Committee	0 / 550 2011 election	Participated
Turkey	Labour Party	Selma Gürkan; General Secretary	0 / 550 2011 election	Participated
Ukraine	Communist Party of Ukraine	Petro Symonenko; General Secretary	0 / 450 2014 election	Participated
Ukraine	Union of Communists of Ukraine	Collective leadership Central Committee	0 / 450 2014 election	Has not participated
United States	Communist Party USA	Sam Webb; Chairman	0 / 435 2012 election	Participated
Vietnam	Communist Party of Vietnam	Nguyễn Phú Trọng; General Secretary	458 / 500 2012 election	Participated

=== 15th International Meeting, 2013 ===
The 15th International Meeting of Communist and Workers' Parties took place from 8 to 10 November 2013 in Lisbon, Portugal.

=== 16th International Meeting, 2014 ===
The 16th International Meeting of Communist and Workers' Parties took place from 13 to 15 November 2014 in Guayaquil, Ecuador. It was attended by 85 delegates representing 53 parties from 44 countries.

=== 17th International Meeting, 2015 ===
The 17th International Meeting of Communist and Workers' Parties took place in Istanbul, Turkey, from 30 October to 1 November 2015.

Country	Party	Leaders	Parliamentary representation	Type
Algeria	Algerian Party for Democracy and Socialism	Collective leadership Central Committee	0 / 462 2012 election	Participated
Azerbaijan	Communist Party of Azerbaijan	Telman Nurullayev; General Secretary	0 / 125 2015 election	Participated
Bangladesh	Workers Party of Bangladesh	Syed Abu Zafar; General Secretary	6 / 300 2014 election	Participated
Belgium	Workers' Party of Belgium	Peter Mertens; President	2 / 150 2014 election	Participated
Brazil	Brazilian Communist Party	Ivan Pinheiro; General Secretary	0 / 513 2014 election	Participated
Brazil	Communist Party of Brazil	José Renato Rabelo; President	10 / 513 2014 election	Participated
Canada	Communist Party of Canada	Miguel Figueroa; General Secretary	0 / 338 2015 election	Participated
China	Chinese Communist Party	Xi Jinping; General Secretary	2,157 / 2,987 2013 election	Participated
Croatia	Socialist Workers' Party of Croatia	Ivan Plješa; President	0 / 151 2015 election	Participated
Cuba	Communist Party of Cuba	Raúl Castro; First Secretary	612 / 612 2013 election	Participated
Cyprus	Progressive Party of Working People	Andros Kyprianou; General Secretary	16 / 56 2016 election	Participated
Czech Republic	Communist Party of Bohemia and Moravia	Vojtěch Filip; Chairman	15 / 200 2017 election	Participated
Denmark	Communist Party in Denmark	Betty Frydensbjerg Carlsson; Chairman	0 / 179 2011 election	Participated
Denmark	Communist Party of Denmark	Henrik Stamer Hedin; Chairman	0 / 179 2011 election	Participated
Finland	Communist Party of Finland	Juha-Pekka Väisänen; Chairman	0 / 200 2015 election	Participated
Georgia	Unified Communist Party of Georgia		0 / 150 2012 election	Participated
Germany	German Communist Party	Bettina Jürgensen; General Secretary	0 / 631 2013 election	Participated
Bulgaria	Communist Party of Bulgaria	Aleksandar Paunov; Leader	0 / 240 2014 election	Participated
Great Britain	Communist Party of Britain	Robert Griffiths; General Secretary	0 / 650 2015 election	Participated
Greece	Communist Party of Greece	Dimitris Koutsoumpas; General Secretary	15 / 300 September 2015 election	Participated
Hungary	Hungarian Workers' Party	Gyula Thürmer; Chairman	0 / 199 2014 election	Participated
India	Communist Party of India	Suravaram Sudhakar Reddy; General Secretary	1 / 543 2014 election	Participated
India	Communist Party of India (Marxist)	Sitaram Yechury; General Secretary	7 / 543 2014 election	Participated
Iran	Tudeh Party of Iran	Ali Khavari; General Secretary	Illegal	Participated
Iraq	Iraqi Communist Party	Hamid Majid Mousa; General Secretary	1 / 328 2014 election	Participated
Iraq	Kurdistan Communist Party – Iraq	Kamal Shakir; General Secretary	0 / 325 2014 election	Participated
Ireland	Communist Party of Ireland	Eugene McCartan; General Secretary	0 / 158 2016 election	Participated
Ireland	Workers' Party (Ireland)	Mick Finnegan; President	0 / 158 2016 election	Participated
Israel	Communist Party of Israel	Collective leadership	3 / 120 2015 election	Participated
Kazakhstan	Communist Party of Kazakhstan	Gaziz Aldamzharov; Leader	Illegal	Participated
Laos	Lao People's Revolutionary Party	Choummaly Sayasone; General Secretary	128 / 132 2011 election	Participated
Lebanon	Lebanese Communist Party	Khaled Hadadi; General Secretary	0 / 128 2009 election	Participated
Lithuania	Socialist People's Front	Edikas Jagelavičius; Leader	0 / 141 2012 election	Participated
Macedonia	Communist Party of Macedonia		0 / 123 2013 election	Participated
Mexico	Communist Party of Mexico	Pável Blanco Cabrera; General Secretary	0 / 500 2012 election	Participated
Netherlands	New Communist Party of the Netherlands	Job Pruijser; Chairman	0 / 150 2012 election	Participated
Norway	Communist Party of Norway	Jørgen Hovde; Chairman	0 / 169 2013 election	Participated
Palestine	Palestinian People's Party	Bassam as-Salhi; General Secretary	1 / 132 2006 election	Participated
Palestine	Palestinian Communist Party		Did not participate	Participated
Philippines	Partido Komunista ng Pilipinas	Pedro P. Baguisa; Chairman		Sent message
Portugal	Portuguese Communist Party	Jerónimo de Sousa; General Secretary	15 / 230 2015 election	Participated
Russia	Communist Party of the Russian Federation	Gennady Zyuganov; Chairman	42 / 450 2016 election	Participated
Russia	Russian Communist Workers' Party of the Communist Party of the Soviet Union	Viktor Tyulkin; Chairman	0 / 450 2011 election	Participated
Russia	Communist Party of the Soviet Union	Sergey Alexandrov; First Secretary	Did not participate	Participated
Serbia	Communists of Serbia	Svetozar Markanović; President	0 / 250 2016 election	Sent message
South Africa	South African Communist Party	Blade Nzimande; General Secretary	0 / 400 2014 election	Participated
Spain	Communist Party of Spain	José Luis Centella; General Secretary	5 / 350 2016 election	Participated
Spain	Communist Party of the Peoples of Spain	Carmelo Suárez; General Secretary	0 / 350 2016 election	Participated
Sudan	Sudanese Communist Party	Muhammad Mukhtar Al-Khatib; General Secretary	0 / 450 2010 election	Participated
Sweden	Communist Party of Sweden	Victor Diaz de Filippi; Chairman	0 / 349 2014 election	Participated
Syria	Syrian Communist Party (Unified)	Hanin Nimir; General Secretary	3 / 250 2012 election	Participated
Tajikistan	Communist Party of Tajikistan	Shodi Shabdolov; General Secretary	2 / 63 2010 election	Sent message
Turkey	Communist Party	Collective leadership Central Committee	0 / 550 2011 election	Participated
Ukraine	Communist Party of Ukraine	Petro Symonenko; General Secretary	0 / 450 2014 election	Participated
Ukraine	Union of Communists of Ukraine	Collective leadership Central Committee	0 / 450 2014 election	Participated
Venezuela	Communist Party of Venezuela	Oscar Figuera; General Secretary	2 / 165 2010 election	Sent message
Vietnam	Communist Party of Vietnam	Nguyễn Phú Trọng; General Secretary	458 / 500 2012 election	Participated

=== 18th International Meeting, 2016 ===
The 18th International Meeting of Communist and Workers' Parties took place in Hanoi, Vietnam, from 28 to 30 October 2016.

=== 19th International Meeting, 2017 ===
The 19th International Meeting of Communist and Workers' Parties, with the theme "The 100th Anniversary of the Great October Socialist Revolution:the ideals of the Communist Movement, revitalizing the struggle against imperialistic wars, for peace, socialism", took place in St. Petersburg, Russia, from 2 to 3 November 2017 and in Moscow, Russia, from 5 to 7 November 2017.

=== 20th International meeting, 2018 ===
The 20th International Meeting of Communist and Workers' Parties, with the theme "The contemporary working class and its alliance. The tasks of its political vanguard – the Communist and Worker's Parties – in the struggle against exploitation and imperialist wars, for the rights of the workers and of the peoples, for peace, for socialism", took place in Athens, Greece, from 23 to 25 November 2018.

Country	Party	Leaders	Parliamentary representation	Type
Albania	Communist Party of Albania	Qemal Cicollari; General Secretary	0 / 140 2017 election	Participated
Algeria	Algerian Party for Democracy and Socialism	Collective leadership Central Committee	0 / 462 2017 election	Participated
Argentina	Communist Party of Argentina	Victor Gorodeki Kot; General Secretary	0 / 257 2015 election	Participated
Australia	Communist Party of Australia (CPA)	Bob Briton (Former)General Secretary	0 / 151 2019 election	Participated
Austria	Party of Labour of Austria	Otto Bruckner; Leader	0 / 183 2017 election	Participated
Azerbaijan	Communist Party of Azerbaijan	Telman Nurullayev; General Secretary	0 / 125 2015 election	Participated
Bahrain	Progressive Democratic Tribune	Hassan Madan; General Secretary	2 / 40 2018 election	Participated
Bangladesh	Communist Party of Bangladesh	Mujahidul Islam Selim; President	0 / 300 2018 election	Participated
Belarus	Communist Party of Belarus	Igor Karpenko; General Secretary	8 / 110 2016 election	Participated
Belgium	Communist Party of Belgium	Arne Baillière; Leader	0 / 150 2014 election	Participated
Bolivia	Communist Party of Bolivia	Ignacio Mendoza Pizarro; First secretary	0 / 130 2014 election	Participated
Brazil	Brazilian Communist Party	Ivan Pinheiro; General Secretary	0 / 513 2014 election	Participated
Brazil	Communist Party of Brazil	Luciana de Oliveira Santos; President	8 / 513 2018 election	Participated
Bulgaria	Communist Party of Bulgaria	Alexander Paunov; General Secretary	0 / 240 2017 election	Participated
Bulgaria	Party of the Bulgarian Communists	Collective leadership	0 / 240 2017 election	Participated
Canada	Communist Party of Canada	Elizabeth Rowley; Leader	0 / 338 2015 election	Participated
China	Chinese Communist Party	Xi Jinping; General Secretary	2,119 / 2,980 2018 election	Participated
Croatia	Socialist Labour Party of Croatia	Vlado Bušić; President	0 / 151 2015 election	Participated
Cuba	Communist Party of Cuba	Raúl Castro; First Secretary	612 / 612 2018 election	Participated
Cyprus	Progressive Party of Working People (AKEL)	Andros Kyprianou; General Secretary	16 / 56 2016 election	Participated
Czech Republic	Communist Party of Bohemia and Moravia	Vojtěch Filip; Chairman	15 / 200 2017 election	Participated
Denmark	Communist Party in Denmark	Betty Frydensbjerg Carlsson; Chairman	0 / 179 2015 election	Participated
Denmark	Communist Party of Denmark	Henrik Stamer Hedin; Chairman	0 / 179 2015 election	Participated
Dominican Republic	Force of the Revolution	Juan Gomez; General secretary	0 / 190 2016 election	Participated
Ecuador	Communist Party of Ecuador	Winston Alarcón Elizalde; Leader	0 / 137 2017 election	Participated
Estonia	Communist Party of Estonia (CPSU)	Underground	Illegal	Participated
Finland	Communist Party of Finland	Juha-Pekka Väisänen; Chairman	0 / 200 2019 election	Participated
France	French Communist Party	Fabien Roussel; National Secretary	11 / 577 2017 election	Participated
Georgia	Unified Communist Party of Georgia	Nugzar Shalvovich Avaliani; Leader	0 / 150 2016 election	Participated
Germany	German Communist Party	Patrik Köbele; Chairman	0 / 709 2017 election	Participated
Great Britain	Communist Party of Britain (CPB)	Robert Griffiths; General Secretary	0 / 179 2015 election	Participated
Great Britain	New Communist Party of Britain	Andy Brooks; Secretary-General	0 / 179 2015 election	Participated
Greece	Communist Party of Greece	Dimitris Koutsoumpas; General Secretary	15 / 300 September 2015 election	Participated
Hungary	Hungarian Workers' Party	Gyula Thürmer; Chairman	0 / 199 2018 election	Participated
India	Communist Party of India	D. Raja; General Secretary	2 / 543 2019 election	Participated
India	Communist Party of India (Marxist)	Sitaram Yechury; General Secretary	3 / 543 2019 election	Participated
Iran	Tudeh Party of Iran	Navid Shomali; International Secretary	Illegal	Participated
Iraq	Iraqi Communist Party	Raid Jahid Fahmi; General Secretary	2 / 328 2018 election	Participated
Iraq	Kurdistan Communist Party/Iraq	Kawa Mahmud; General Secretary	0 / 325 2018 election	Participated
Ireland	Communist Party of Ireland	Eugene McCartan; General Secretary	0 / 158 2016 election	Participated
Ireland	Workers' Party (Ireland)	Mick Finnegan; President	0 / 158 2016 election	Participated
Israel	Israeli Communist Party	Collective leadership	3 / 120 2019 election	Participated
Italy	Communist Party	Marco Rizzo; General Secretary	0 / 630 2018 election	Participated
Italy	Italian Communist Party	Mauro Alboresi; General Secretary	0 / 630 2018 election	Participated
Jordan	Jordanian Communist Party	Faraj Al-Tameezi; General Secretary	1 / 130 2016 election	Participated
Kazakhstan	Socialist Resistance of Kazakhstan	Ainur Kurmanov; Co-chairman	Illegal	Participated
Korea, North	Workers' Party of Korea	Kim Jong-un; Chairman	607 / 687 2019 election	Participated
Kyrgyzstan	Party of Communists of Kyrgyzstan	Bumairam Mamaseitova; Chairman	0 / 120 2015 election	Participated
Laos	Lao People's Revolutionary Party	Bounnhang Vorachith; General Secretary	144 / 149 2016 election	Participated
Latvia	Socialist Party of Latvia	Vladimirs Frolovs; General Secretary	1 / 100 2018 election	Participated
Lebanon	Lebanese Communist Party – LCP	Hanna Gharib; General Secretary	0 / 128 2018 election	Participated
Lithuania	Socialist Party of Lithuania	Collective leadership Central Committee	0 / 141 2016 election	Participated
Luxembourg	Communist Party of Luxembourg	Ali Ruckert; Chairman	0 / 60 2018 election	Participated
Madagascar	Congress Party for the Independence of Madagascar	Solofo Razanatoandro; General Secretary	0 / 151 2013 election	Participated
Malta	Communist Party of Malta	Victor Degiovanni; General Secretary	0 / 500 2017 election	Participated
Mexico	Communist Party of Mexico	Pável Blanco Cabrera; General Secretary	0 / 500 2018 election	Participated
Nepal	Communist Party of Nepal (Unified Marxist–Leninist)	KP Sharma Oli; Chairman	121 / 275 2017 election	Participated
Netherlands	New Communist Party of the Netherlands	Job Pruijser; Chairman	0 / 150 2017 election	Participated
North Macedonia	Communist Party of Macedonia	Pero Odzaklieski; General Secretary	0 / 120 2016 election	Participated
Norway	Communist Party of Norway	Runa Evensen; Chairman	0 / 169 2017 election	Participated
Pakistan	Communist Party of Pakistan	Jameel Ahmad Malik; Chairman	Did not participate	Participated
Palestine	Palestinian People's Party	Bassam as-Salhi; General Secretary	1 / 132 2006 election	Participated
Palestine	Palestinian Communist Party	Mahmoud Saadeh; General Secretary	0 / 132 2006 election	Participated
Paraguay	Paraguayan Communist Party	Najeeb Amado; General Secretary	0 / 80 2018 election	Participated
Poland	Polish Communist Party	Krzysztof Szwej; General Secretary	0 / 460 2015 election	Participated
Portugal	Portuguese Communist Party	Jerónimo de Sousa; General Secretary	15 / 230 2015 election	Participated
Romania	Romanian Socialist Party	Constantin Rotaru; General Secretary	0 / 329 2016 election	Participated
Russia	Communist Party of the Russian Federation	Gennady Zyuganov; Chairman	42 / 450 2016 election	Participated
Russia	Russian Communist Workers' Party of the Communist Party of the Soviet Union	Viktor Tyulkin; Chairman	0 / 450 2016 election	Participated
Russia	Communist Party of the Soviet Union (2001)	Sergey Alexandrov; First Secretary	0 / 450 2016 election	Participated
Serbia	Communists of Serbia	Svetozar Markanović; President	0 / 250 2016 election	Participated
Serbia	New Communist Party of Yugoslavia	Aleksandar Banjanac; General Secretary	0 / 250 2016 election	Participated
South Africa	South African Communist Party (SACP)	Blade Nzimande; General Secretary	0 / 400 2019 election (Note: The SACP does not run under its own name, but participates in government as part of the Tripartite Alliance)	Participated
Spain	Communist Party of Spain	José Luis Centella; General Secretary	6 / 350 2019 election	Participated
Spain	Communist Party of the Peoples of Spain	Carmelo Suárez; General Secretary	0 / 350 2019 election	Participated
Spain	Communist Party of the Workers of Spain	Ástor García; General Secretary	0 / 350 2019 election	Participated
Sri Lanka	Communist Party of Sri Lanka	D. E. W. Gunasekera; General Secretary	1 / 225 2015 election	Participated
Eswatini	Communist Party of Swaziland	Thokozane Kenneth; General Secretary	0 / 65 2018 election	Participated
Sweden	Communist Party of Sweden	Andreas Sörensen; Chairman	0 / 349 2018 election	Participated
Sudan	Sudanese Communist Party	Muhammad Mukhtar Al-Khatib; General Secretary	0 / 450 2010 election	Participated
Syria	Syrian Communist Party (Unified)	Hanin Nimir; General Secretary	1 / 250 2016 election	Participated
Tajikistan	Communist Party of Tajikistan	Miroj Abdulloyev; General Secretary	2 / 63 2010 election	Participated
Turkey	Communist Party	Collective leadership Central Committee	0 / 550 2018 election	Participated
Turkey	Labour Party	Selma Gürkan; General Secretary	0 / 550 2018 election	Participated
United States	Communist Party USA	John Bachtell; Chairman	0 / 435 2018 election	Participated
Ukraine	Communist Party of Ukraine	Petro Symonenko; General Secretary	Illegal	Participated
Venezuela	Communist Party of Venezuela	Oscar Figuera; General Secretary	2 / 165 2015 election	Participated
Vietnam	Communist Party of Vietnam (CPV)	Nguyễn Phú Trọng; General Secretary	473 / 494 2016 election	Participated

=== 21st International meeting, 2019 ===
The 21st International Meeting of Communist and Workers' Parties, with the theme "100th anniversary of the founding of the Communist International. The fight for peace and socialism continues", took place in İzmir, Turkey, from 18 to 20 October 2019, and was hosted by the Communist Party of Turkey and the Communist Party of Greece.

=== Extraordinary TeleConference, 2021 ===
Due to the COVID-19 pandemic, delegates to the International Meeting of Communist and Workers' Parties did not meet in 2020. However, a virtual meeting was held over Zoom on 10 and 11 December 2021.

Participants of the Extraordinary TeleConference of the International Meeting of Communist and Workers' Parties, 2021
- Algerian Party for Democracy and Socialism
- Communist Party of Argentina
- Communist Party of Australia
- Party of Labour of Austria
- Azerbaijan Communist Party
- Progressive Democratic Tribune (Bahrain)
- Communist Party of Bangladesh
- Communist Party of Belgium
- Workers' Party of Belgium
- Communist Party of Brazil
- Brazilian Communist Party
- Communist Party of Britain
- Communist Party of Canada
- Socialist Workers' Party of Croatia
- Communist Party of Cuba
- Progressive Party of Working People (Cyprus)
- Communist Party of Bohemia & Moravia
- Communist Party in Denmark
- Communist Party of Ecuador
- Communist Party of Finland
- French Communist Party
- German Communist Party
- Hungarian Workers' Party
- Communist Party of India
- Communist Party of India (Marxist)
- Tudeh Party of Iran
- Iraqi Communist Party
- Communist Party of Kurdistan – Iraq
- Communist Party of Ireland
- Workers' Party (Ireland)
- Communist Party of Israel
- Communist Party (Italy)
- Jordanian Communist Party
- Socialist Movement of Kazakhstan
- Workers' Party of Korea
- Lao People's Revolutionary Party
- Socialist Party of Latvia
- Lebanese Communist Party
- Communist Party of Mexico
- Popular Socialist Party of Mexico
- Communist Party of Norway
- Communist Party of Pakistan
- Palestinian Communist Party
- Palestinian People's Party
- Paraguayan Communist Party
- Peruvian Communist Party
- Communist Party of the Philippines – 1930
- Communist Party of Poland
- Portuguese Communist Party
- Romanian Socialist Party
- Russian Communist Workers' Party
- Communist Party of the Russian Federation
- Union of Communist Parties - Communist Party of the Soviet Union
- New Communist Party of Yugoslavia
- Party of the Communists of Serbia
- South African Communist Party
- Communist Party of Spain
- Communist Party of the Peoples of Spain
- Communist Party of the Workers of Spain
- Communists of Catalonia
- Communist Party of Sri Lanka
- Sudanese Communist Party
- Communist Party of Swaziland
- Communist Party of Sweden
- Syrian Communist Party (Bakdash)
- Syrian Communist Party (Unified)
- Communist Party of Ukraine
- Union of Communists of Ukraine
- Communist Party of Venezuela
- Communist Party of Vietnam

=== 22nd International meeting, 2022 ===
The 22nd meeting of the Communist and Workers' Parties was held from 27 to 29 October 2022, in Havana, Cuba, with the Communist Party of Cuba as hosting party. The themes for the meeting where "Solidarity with Cuba and all the struggling peoples. United we are stronger in the anti-imperialist struggle, together with social and popular movements, in the face of capitalism and its policies, the threat of fascism and war; in defense of peace, the environment, workers' rights, solidarity and socialism." The final declaration of the meeting includes; denouncing "the strengthening and expansion of NATO", "the aggravation of tensions and military conflicts, such as the one in Ukraine" and "the resurgence of fascism in various parts of the world" and calling for unity to combat the "reemergence of anti-communist, reactionary, ultra-nationalist and fascist forces in various parts of the world". Additionally, the meeting called for mobilization of support in favor of the Polisario Front, promoting international solidarity with the Bolivarian Republic of Venezuela, and support for Puerto Rican independence. Members in attendance included:

- Algerian Party for Democracy and Socialism
- Communist Party of Argentina
- Communist Party of Australia
- Party of Labour of Austria
- Communist Party of Azerbaijan
- Workers Party of Bangladesh
- Communist Party of Belgium
- Communist Party of Brazil
- Brazilian Communist Party
- Communist Party of Britain
- Communist Party of Canada
- Colombian Communist Party
- Communist Party of Bohemia and Moravia
- Communist Party in Denmark
- Communist Party of Denmark
- Communist Party of Finland
- French Communist Party
- German Communist Party
- Communist Party of Greece
- Hungarian Workers Party
- Communist Party of India
- Communist Party of India (Marxist)
- Iraqi Communist Party
- Tudeh Party of Iran
- Communist Party of Ireland
- Workers Party of Ireland
- Communist Party (Italy)
- Socialist Movement of Kazakhstan
- Workers' Party of Korea
- Party of Communists of Kyrgyzstan
- Lao People's Revolutionary Party
- Communist Party of Luxembourg
- Communist Party of Mexico
- Popular Socialist Party of Mexico
- New Communist Party of the Netherlands
- Communist Party of Norway
- Communist Party of Pakistan
- Palestinian Communist Party
- Peruvian Communist Party
- Portuguese Communist Party
- Russian Communist Workers Party
- Communist Party of the Russian Federation
- Union of Communist Parties - Communist Party of the Soviet Union
- New Communist Party of Yugoslavia
- Communists of Serbia
- Communist Party of Spain
- Communist Party of the Peoples of Spain
- Communist Party of the Workers of Spain
- Communists of Catalonia
- Communist Party of Swaziland
- Communist Party of Sweden
- Communist Party of Turkey
- Communist Party of Ukraine
- Communist Party USA
- Communist Party of Vietnam

=== 23rd International Meeting, 2023 ===
The 23rd meeting of the Communist and Workers' Parties was held from 20 to 22 October 2023, in İzmir, Turkey with the Communist Party of Turkey as hosting party. Members in attendance included:

- Communist Party of Turkey
- Communist Party of Australia
- Party of Labour of Austria
- Communist Party of Azerbaijan
- Progressive Democratic Tribune (Bahrain)
- Communist Party of Belarus
- Communist Party of Belgium
- Workers Party of Belgium
- Communist Party of Brazil
- Brazilian Communist Party
- Communist Party of Britain
- Communist Party of Canada
- Colombian Communist Party
- Socialist Labour Party of Croatia
- Progressive Party of Working People (Cyprus)
- Communist Party of Bohemia & Moravia
- Communist Party of Denmark
- Communist Party of El Salvador
- Communist Party of Finland
- Unified Communist Party of Georgia
- German Communist Party
- Communist Party of Greece
- Hungarian Workers' Party
- Communist Party of India
- Communist Party of India (Marxist)
- Tudeh Party of Iran
- Iraqi Communist Party
- Communist Party of Kurdistan-Iraq
- Communist Party of Ireland
- Workers Party of Ireland
- Communist Party (Italy)
- Socialist Movement of Kazakhstan
- Workers Party of Korea
- Socialist Party of Latvia
- Lebanese Communist Party
- Communist Party of Luxembourg
- Communist Party of Mexico
- Popular Socialist Party of Mexico
- New Communist Party of the Netherlands
- Communist Party of Macedonia
- Communist Party of Norway
- Communist Party of Pakistan
- Palestinian Communist Party
- Paraguayan Communist Party
- Portuguese Communist Party
- Communist Party of the Russian Federation
- Russian Communist Workers Party
- New Communist Party of Yugoslavia
- South African Communist Party
- Communist Party of Spain
- Communist Party of the Peoples of Spain
- Communist Party of the Workers of Spain
- Communists of Catalonia
- Communist Party of Sri Lanka
- Sudanese Communist Party
- Communist Party of Sweden
- Swiss Communist Party
- Communist Party (Switzerland)
- Syrian Communist Party [Unified]
- Union of Communists of Ukraine
- Communist Party of Uruguay
- Communist Party USA
- Communist Party of Venezuela
- Communist Party of Vietnam

=== 24th International Meeting, 2026 ===
The 24th IMCWP was held from 7 to 9 August 2026, in Havana, Cuba, hosted by the PCC. Its title was "Defending and honouring the legacy of the Cuban Revolution on the centenary of Fidel’s birth; deepening solidarity with socialist Cuba; strengthening our joint actions; and uniting our forces for peace and against imperialist aggression". The final speech of the 24th meeting was delivered by the president of the Republic of Cuba, Miguel Díaz-Canel, who reiterated that Marxism-Leninism "remains fully valid", despite ongoing capitalist-inclined economic reforms. On the occasion of the 100th anniversary of Fidel Castro's birth, many parties of the meeting also participated in the First International Colloquium "Fidel: Legacy and Future", also organized by the PCC in Havana.

Parties attending the meeting included the Communist Party of Vietnam, the Communist Party of Brazil, the Communist Party of Britain, the French Communist Party, the German Communist Party, the Communist Party of Greece (KKE), the Communist Party of India (Marxist), the Tudeh Party of Iran, the Communist Party of the Workers of Spain, the Communist Party of the Peoples of Spain, the Communist Party of Israel, the Communist Party of Cuba, AKEL, the Lebanese Communist Party, the Communist Party of Mexico, the Hungarian Workers’ Party, the Communist Party of Ukraine, the Union of Communists of Ukraine, the Portuguese Communist Party, the Communist Party of the Russian Federation, the Russian Communist Workers' Party, the Communist Party of Turkey, and the Communist Party of Bohemia and Moravia (Czech Republic).

== See also ==
- World Federation of Democratic Youth
- International Communist Seminar
- Communist International
- Communist Information Bureau
- Council for Mutual Economic Assistance
- Political international
