= Communist Party of Macedonia =

Communist Party of Macedonia may refer to:

- League of Communists of Macedonia, named "Communist Party of Macedonia" from a date in World War II until 1952
- Communist Party of Macedonia (1992)
