= Communist Party of Malta =

Communist Party of Malta Partit Komunista Malti
- Abbreviation: PKM
- General Secretary: Victor Degiovanni
- Founder: Anthony Vassallo
- Founded: 1969
- Split from: Malta Labour Party
- Headquarters: 28/8 Vincenti Buildings, Triq Id-Dejqa, Valletta
- Newspaper: Proletarjat (1977-1979) Żminijietna (1983-1989)
- Youth wing: Young Communist League
- Ideology: Communism; Marxism–Leninism
- Political position: Far-left
- European affiliation: INITIATIVE
- International affiliation: IMCWP
- Colors: Red
- Slogan: Workers of the world, unite!

Website
- communistpartymalta.blogspot.com

Communist Party of Malta (Maltese: Partit Komunista Malti) is a Marxist-Leninist party in Malta. PKM was founded in 1969 at a secret congress in the town of Gwardamangia, following the departure from the Malta Labour Party of a group of left-wing militants that had been active in the struggle for national independence. Anthony Vassallo was the founding general secretary of the party. The party first contested the national general elections of 1987 when it obtained 0.1% of first preference votes and no parliamentary seats. Since then it has not stood for any other election whether at a European, national or local level.

The current general secretary of the party is Victor Degiovanni, who took over the post from Anthony Vassallo in 2004.

== Creation ==
After the October Revolution, secret communist cells were formed, however small in number. In 1933, an attempt by the colonial government and the Catholic Church to crack down on left-wing factions of the Malta Labour Party, dockyard workers and intellectuals were imprisoned for the "crime" of possessing socialist literature. Independent progressive movements faced large setbacks due to the sedition trials whilst Maltese communists militated either in the Italian Communist Party, the Communist Party of Great Britain or covertly within the Malta Labour Party. Malta did not have its own explicitly communist party before the establishment of the PKM in a secret congress in the town of Gwardamangia in 1969 but nevertheless, state suppression of suspected communists continued until 1971.

== Post-independence Activities ==
After the right-wing administration of George Borg Olivier was defeated by the Malta Labour Party in 1971 under Dom Mintoff, the PKM was able to establish itself and organise openly. The PKM organised protests and meetings as well as commemorations to Maltese working class figures in support of emancipation such as Manwel Dimech. According to the US intelligence department by 1970 PKM's membership was around 100 members. The PKM also took part in international seminars, and was key in helping the Maltese government establish positive relations with the Workers' Party of Korea and a subsequent Juche study group called The Juche Philosophy and Songun Policy Study Group. Despite having originally split off it, the party critically-supported the Malta Labour Party under Dom Mintoff and Karmenu Mifsud Bonnici and took part in several May Day demonstrations.

In the 1990s, the party collaborated with the left-wing non-governmental organisation Moviment Graffitti, allowing it to hold meetings at the Communist Party headquarters in Valletta before it was able to lease its own office. In 2016, the two groups published a joint statement appealing for a reformation of the neutrality clause in the Constitution of Malta to ban warships from all countries from docking in Maltese ports.

== Political organisation in the Post-Soviet Era ==
PKM participates in Maltese politics by campaigning in joint-solidarity with international issues and talk about local issues.

== Electoral performance ==
| Election | Leader | Seats contested | Votes | % | Seats | Rank | Status |
|---|---|---|---|---|---|---|---|
| 1987 | Anthony Vassallo | 0 / 69 | 119 | 0.1 | 0 / 69 | 4th | Extra-parliamentary |
