= Communist Party of Bulgaria =

Political party in Bulgaria

Communist Party of Bulgaria Комунистическа партия на България
- Abbreviation: CPB
- Leader: Aleksandar Paunov
- Founded: 1996; 30 years ago
- Split from: Bulgarian Socialist Party
- Headquarters: 10th Building, Tsar Kaloyan St., Sofia
- Newspaper: Rabotničeski vestnik ('Workers' Newspaper')
- Membership (2017): 20,000
- Ideology: Communism; Marxism–Leninism
- National affiliation: BSP for Bulgaria (until 2021); Neutral Bulgaria (2023-2024); BSP – United Left (2024)
- International affiliation: IMCWP
- Colours: Red
- National Assembly: 0 / 240
- European Parliament: 0 / 17

Website
- comparty.bg

The Communist Party of Bulgaria (CPB) (Note: Bulgarian: Комунистическа партия на България, (КПБ), romanized: Komunističeska partija na Bǎlgarija (KPB)) is a Marxist-Leninist party in Bulgaria, currently led by Aleksandar Paunov.

The party was founded in 1996 as the Communist Party.

Since 2001, it is part of the Coalition for Bulgaria, an alliance led by the Bulgarian Socialist Party. The party publishes the newspaper Rabotnicheski Vestnik. In the 2014 parliamentary election, the Coalition for Bulgaria received 15.4% of the popular vote and 39 out of 240 seats. The party remains represented in Parliament within the coalition after the 2017 election.

The party came under fire during the 2020 protests, when it was alleged that first secretary, Aleksandar Paunov, had had a phone call with convicted businessman Vasil Bozhkov. Alexander Paunov went on to admit that the conversation took place, but denied any wrongdoing. This led to Alexander Paunov being asked to leave the BSP for Bulgaria parliamentary group, of which he was a part, becoming an independent MP.
