= Popular Socialist Party of Mexico =

Communist party in Mexico

Popular Socialist Party of Mexico Partido Popular Socialista de México
- Abbreviation: PPSM
- Leader: Cuauhtémoc Amezcua Dromundo
- Founded: 1997
- Split from: Popular Socialist Party
- Headquarters: Mexico City
- Ideology: Communism; Marxism–Leninism; Anti-imperialism; Latin American integration
- Political position: Far-left
- International affiliation: IMCWP

The Popular Socialist Party of Mexico (Spanish: Partido Popular Socialista de México, PPSM) is a Marxist–Leninist communist party in Mexico, formed in 1997 after a split from the Popular Socialist Party (PPS).

Cuauhtémoc Amezcua Dromundo is the First Secretary of the Central Committee of the party, Juan Campos Vega is the Second Secretary. Other Central Committee members are Belisario Aguilar Olvera, Dolores del Carmen Chinas Salazar, Adrián García Enríquez, Martha Elvia García García, Luis Miranda Reséndiz, Mario Ochoa Vega, José Santos Cervantes, Jorge Tovar Montañés and José Santos Urbina.

The youth wing of PPSM is the Youth for Socialism (Jóvenes por el Socialismo). PPSM publishes Teoría y Práctica.

Ahead of the 2006 presidential election, PPSM declared that it would not support any candidate. The party is not recognized by the National Electoral Institute.

== International relations ==
The PPSM is politically close to the Workers' Party of Belgium (PTB), and participated in the annual international seminar hosted by WPB.
