= Union of Communists of Ukraine =

Union of Communists of Ukraine Союз комуністів України
- Abbreviation: SKU or UCU
- Founded: 19 December 1992
- Banned: 2015
- Newspaper: Marksizm i sovremennost
- Ideology: Communism; Marxism–Leninism; Anti-revisionism
- Political position: Far-left
- European affiliation: INITIATIVE (2013–2023); ECA (2023–)
- International affiliation: IMCWP
- Colours: Red
- Verkhovna Rada: 0 / 450

Website
- ucu-rg.org

The Union of Communists of Ukraine (Ukrainian: Союз комуністів України, romanized: Soiuz komunistiv Ukrainy, Russian: Союз коммунистов Украины, romanized: Soyuz kommunistov Ukrainy, abbreviated SKU or UCU) is a Ukrainian anti-revisionist Marxist–Leninist party.

In May 2015, a set of new Ukrainian decommunization laws came into effect, banning the Union of Communists of Ukraine from participating in electoral politics.

== History ==
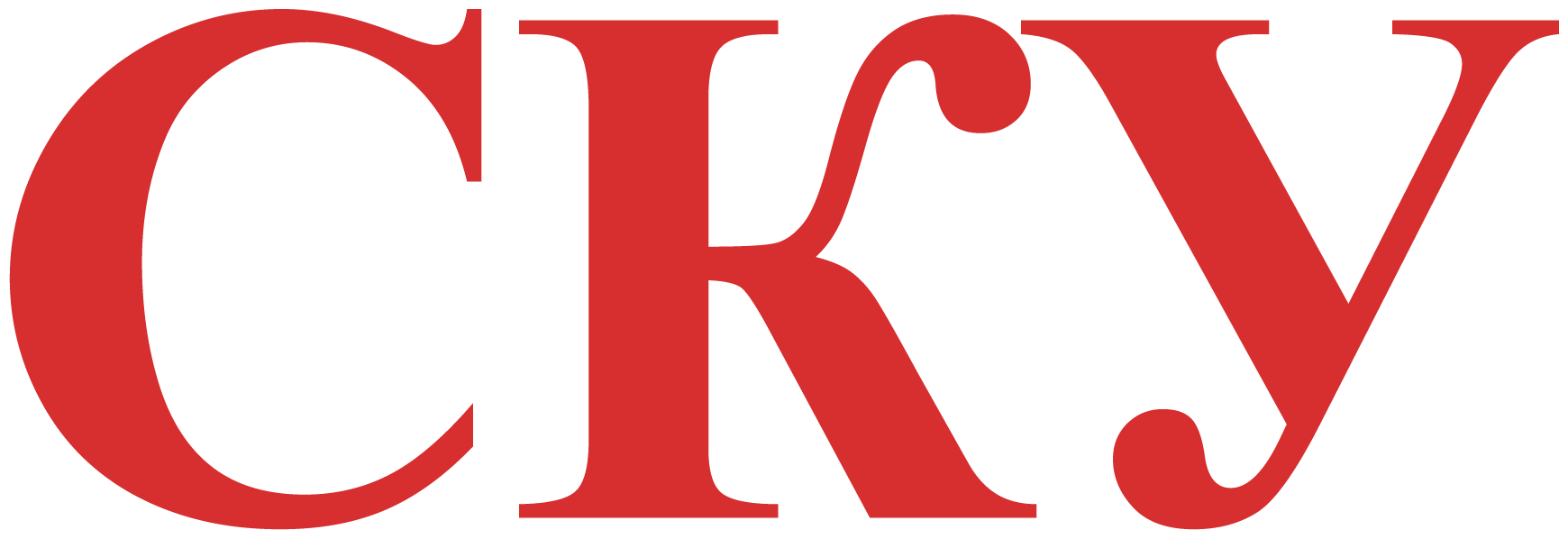
Older logo used by the СКУ

The founding conference of the Union of Communists was held in December 1992, and it was registered with Ukrainian authorities in March 1993. At the time of organization on 12 March 1993 it claimed to have 2,000 members in 13 oblasts. Yurii Solomati was registered as the leader of the organization. The main stronghold of the party has been Luhansk. Initially many party members were also affiliated to the Communist Party of Ukraine (KPU), although the KPU soon began to purge dissident elements. Whilst the influence of the Union of Communists waned, it acted as a competitor of KPU in south-eastern Ukraine at an early stage.

At the 23rd congress of the Union of Communist Parties – Communist Party of the Soviet Union held in March 1993, the Union of Communists was included as an associative member. Considering itself as the legitimate heir of the CPSU, the Union of Communists demanded the return of CPSU property seized by the Ukrainian state. The organization called for the reconstruction of the Soviet Union.

The Union of Communists began publishing the theoretical journal Marksizm i sovremennost' (Марксизм и современность, 'Marxism and Modernity') from Kyiv in 1995. Politically it is close to the Russian Communist Workers Party, with many people (including Yabrova) holding dual memberships.

As of the early 2000s, the group was led by Tamila Yabrova.

In 2013, the party took part in the founding of the Initiative of Communist and Workers' Parties.

In May 2015, laws that ban communist symbols came into effect in Ukraine. Despite this, the Union of Communists of Ukraine remained active.

In June 2022, the party released a statement declaring that the Russian invasion of Ukraine was a confrontation between "the international capitalist alliance of countries, led by the USA and NATO, and the international capitalist alliance of countries, led by Russian state-monopolistic capital."

== See also ==
- List of anti-revisionist groups
