= Communist Party of Mexico (1994) =

Communist Party of Mexico Partido Comunista de México
- Abbreviation: PCM
- General Secretary: Pável Blanco Cabrera
- Founded: 20 November 1994
- Preceded by: Mexican Communist Party
- Headquarters: Mexico City
- Newspaper: El Comunista; El Machete
- Youth wing: Communist Youth Front - Mexico
- Ideology: Communism; Marxism–Leninism; Anti-Revisionism
- Political position: Far-left
- International affiliation: IMCWP

The Communist Party of Mexico (Spanish: Partido Comunista de México, PCM) is a Marxist-Leninist party in Mexico. It advocates internationalism of the proletariat, Leninist organizational theory based on democratic centralism, and Marxism-Leninism.

In 1994 an organizing committee was formed to create the Party of Mexican Communists (Partido de los Comunistas Mexicanos). It was renamed the Communist Party of Mexico in 2010.

The party has engaged in political activities and mobilizations, despite lacking a registration that certifies it as a national party. In the 2024 Mexican presidential election, the party nominated Marco Vinicio Dávila Juarez as an unofficial candidate. His name did not appear on the ballot.

== History ==
=== Background ===
The PCM foundation has its origins in the Mexican Communist Party, which was founded in 1919 and dissolved in 1981 during the XX Congress. Following this, it merged with other left-wing political groups and, in 1989, after the 1988 General Election, it merged into the Party of the Democratic Revolution (PRD).

=== Early Years (1994-2006) ===
The National Organizing Commission of the Party of Mexican Communists (Partido de los Comunistas Mexicanos, PMC) was established on November 20, 1994, by communist movement supporters, the majority of whom were former members of the Popular Socialist Party and the disbanded Mexican Communist Party. It released a manifesto claiming a connection between the PMC and the now-defunct PCM (founded in 1919).

The party's old logo, from 1994 to 2008.

==== First Congress ====
The party adopted the name Party of Mexican Communists at its First Congress in 1996. An amalgam of several communist factions, its political stance was at first unclear, though it expressed concern over the "private capitalist form of the appropriation of wealth". Ultimately, the party formed alliances with other progressive and left-wing groups and, in 2000, backed Cuauhtémoc Cárdenas and Andrés Manuel López Obrador in their campaigns for president of Mexico and head of state of the Federal District. Soon, however, the coalition with the other left-wing and progressive forces disintegrated over a supposed betrayal of "signed accords".

==== Second Congress ====
The Second Party Congress, from April 28 to 30, 2001, adopted the slogan "Socialism or barbarism." The First Congress's positions were not fundamentally altered. The Second Congress's primary goal was to bring together different left-socialist organizations in order to expand the communist movement in Mexico.

During this time, the PCM started to participate in a number of international forums. In December 2001, at the request of the Communist Party of Cuba, it joined the São Paulo Forum; in June 2002, it made its debut in Athens, Greece at the International Meeting of Communist and Workers' Parties.

==== Third Congress ====
The PCM resolved to combine with the Party of the Socialist Revolution (PRS) and take the name "Party of Communists" during its Third Congress, which took place on June 26–27, 2003 and was dubbed the "Unity Congress". For various reasons, however, including the PRS's discomfort with the proposed name-change, the revocation of its state registration, and the fact that it and PCM were centered in different states and cities, the prospects for unification were dim, a fact that led some PCM collaborators not to participate in the Second Congress. Héctor Colío, the PCM's National Coordinator at the time, delivered a report and a draft resolution calling for unification with the PRS in a single Marxist–Leninist party. The unfication effort, however, ultimately failed, forcing the PCM to carry on alone.

The party made the decision to back the Zapatista Army of National Liberation and eventually sign the "Sixth Declaration of the Lacandon Jungle" in 2006.

=== Internal Crisis (2007 - 2011) ===
Efforts to unify the socialist left did not end. In September 2007, Sergio Almaguer Cosió, formerly of the PRS, mooted the idea of a united "Conference of Anticapitalist Political Organizations of the Left."

The PCM participated in the IX Meeting of Communist and Workers' Parties in Minsk in November of that same year. There are two significant critiques. the frontist policy of "unity at all costs", which annulled the workers' and peasants' and Marxist–Leninist party's class autonomy. Additionally, they criticize the nation's misguided popular front policy against fascism, which results in a limited alliance policy.Lastly, they suggest that Oaxaca is where the popular movement's problems first surfaced in 2006: coordination, a national movement, or localized outbursts. this helped solidify some elements that will elevate the political character of the PCM.

The union organization that the party intended to use to forge a stronger bond with the working class was officially called the Unitary Central of Workers (UCW). In reality, the UCW was a letterhead that was more focused on corporatized social organizations and resource management than it was on worker-union work, adhering to the nation's traditional organizational vices.

Internal differences continued to weigh on the party's activities, so a process of rupture began. The Central Committee chaired by Pavel Blanco Cabrera, decided to convene a new congress that could resolve the internal crisis.

The Fourth Congress was held in 2010 and saw the party split in two factions; on the one hand those who continued to group together under the name of the Communist Party, on the other, mainly young people, those who decided to merge with other movements and call themselves the Communist Party of Mexico. The party adopted a line deeply linked to Leninism and anti-revisionism. Currently, the party follows a policy that it has defined as "workers' turning point" and rapprochement with "popular sectors".
