= Palestinian Communist Party (1991) =

Palestinian Communist Party الحزب الشیوعي الفلسطیني
- Secretary-General: Mahmoud Saadeh
- Deputy Leader: Mohammed Alqam (West Bank); Mohammed Abu Namous (Gaza Strip)
- Founded: December 1991
- Split from: Palestinian People's Party
- Headquarters: Ramallah
- Ideology: Communism; Marxism–Leninism; Palestinian nationalism
- Political position: Far-left
- International affiliation: IMCWP
- Legislative Council: 0 / 132

Party flag

Website
- pallcp.ps

The Palestinian Communist Party (Arabic: الحزب الشیوعي الفلسطیني) is a Marxist–Leninist party in Palestine. The Palestinian Communist Party claims to be the political forefront of the working class in Palestine. The party went through great turmoil in the wake of the dissolution of the Soviet Union in 1991 and the defection of a large section of members of the leadership's right wing. After the fall of the USSR, many wanted the party to change its name away from the communist one, but the party decided to re-establish itself in a number of weeks and announced the continuation of the communist name. The party calls for the liberation of Palestine and the establishment of a single progressive state for all of the citizens of the Palestinian land, regardless of their ethnic or religious affiliation.
