= Algerian Party for Democracy and Socialism =

Political party in Algeria

Algerian Party for Democracy and Socialism Parti Algérien pour la Démocratie et le Socialisme الحزب الجزائري للديمقراطية والاشتراكية
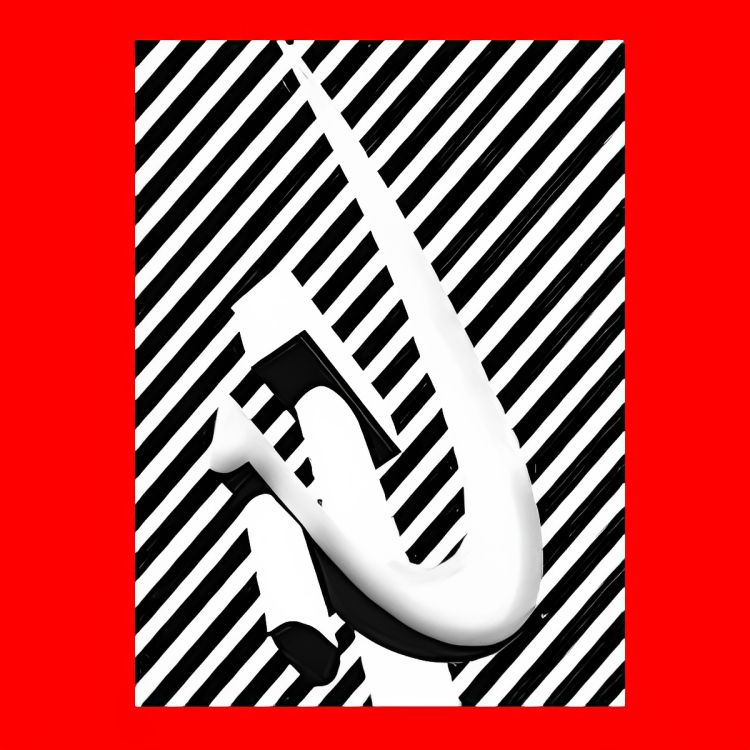
- Abbreviation: PADS
- Governing body: Central Committee
- Founder: Abdelhamid Benzine
- Founded: 1993
- Split from: Ettehadi
- Newspaper: Le Lien des Ouvriers et Paysans
- Ideology: Communism; Marxism–Leninism
- Political position: Far-left
- International affiliation: IMCWP

Website
- http://lien-pads.over-blog.com/

The Algerian Party for Democracy and Socialism (Arabic: الحزب الجزائري للديمقراطية والاشتراكية; French: Parti Algérien pour la Démocratie et le Socialisme, PADS) is a Marxist–Leninist political party in Algeria. In 1993, during the Algerian Civil War, Ettehadi was realigned as a democratic movement resisting Islamism, the Marxist-Leninist wing split apart under the leadership of Abdelhamid Benzine to retain its ideological legacy.

PADS publishes the newspaper Le Lien des Ouvriers et Paysans (The Link of the Workers and Peasants).
