= Khaled Hadadi =

Lebanese politician

Khaled Hadadi (born 1956) is the former general-secretary of the Lebanese Communist Party (LCP) from December 2003 until April 2016. He was born in the city of Barja in Mount Lebanon, Lebanon in 1956. He studied Physics at the Lebanese University and graduated with a B.S. in 1979 before pursuing a Ph.D. in France in 1984. Hadadi taught at the Lebanese University for several years before becoming General-Secretary of LCP.

Hadadi served in the central committee of the party since 1987 and in the political bureau since 1993. He was elected as General Secretary of the Party in 2004 after he defeated the former general-secretary Farouq Dahrouj in the internal elections.
During his term, the party lived through the difficult political times of division between March 8 and March 14 forces in Lebanon. However, under the leadership of Hadadi, the party managed to preserve its independence despite its closer relations with Hizbollah and Michel Aoun, the main leaders of the Lebanese opposition that was known before as the March 8 coalition. He was reelected as secretary general for a second term after the 10th Congress of the Party in February 2009. He was succeeded by Hanna Gharib who was elected after the 12th Congress in April 2016.
