= D. E. W. Gunasekera =

Sri Lankan politician (born 1935)

Hon. D. E. W. Gunasekera MP
- ඩී. ඊ. ඩබ්. ගුණසේකර
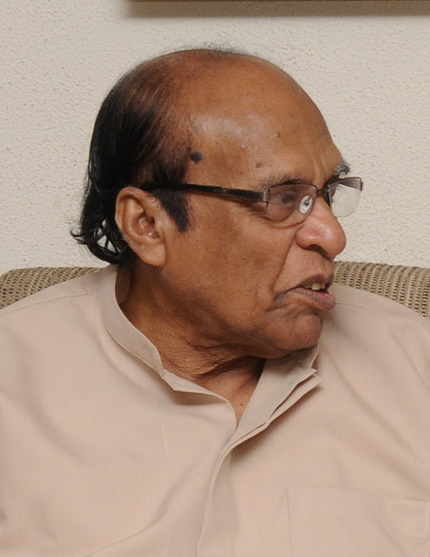

Minister of Constitutional Reform
- In office May 2004 – April 2010
- Preceded by: G. L. Peiris

Minister of Rehabilitation and Prison Reforms
- In office April 2010 – November 2010
- Succeeded by: Chandrasiri Gajadeera

Senior Minister of Human Resources
- In office November 2010 – 12 January 2015

Member of Parliament for National List
- In office 2004–2015

Personal details
- Born: 4 March 1935 (age 91) Kivula, Ceylon
- Party: Communist Party of Sri Lanka
- Other political affiliations: United People's Freedom Alliance
- Education: Vidyalankara University
- Occupation: Civil servant

Don Edwin Weerasinghe Gunasekera (born 4 March 1935) is a Sri Lankan politician, former Member of Parliament and former cabinet minister. He is the current leader of the Communist Party of Sri Lanka (CPSL), a member of the United People's Freedom Alliance (UPFA).

== Early life ==
Gunasekera was born 4 March 1935 in Kivula in southern Ceylon. He was educated at Rahula College in Matara. After school he joined Vidyalankara University in the 1950s, graduating with a degree in economics.

Gunasekera joined Ceylon Law College in the early 1970s but was expelled for attempting to cheat.

== Career ==
After Vidyalankara Gunasekera worked at the Inland Revenue Department for many years.

Gunasekera joined the Communist Party of Ceylon in 1958. He wrote for the party's newspaper Mawbima and was a youth leader. He later became a member of the party's central committee and eventually the party's general secretary.

In 1988 the CPSL, Lanka Sama Samaja Party (LSSP), Nava Sama Samaja Party and Sri Lanka People's Party formed the United Socialist Alliance (USA). Gunasekera was one of the USA's candidates in Matara District at the 1989 parliamentary election but the USA failed to win any seats in the district. On 20 January 2004 the Sri Lanka Freedom Party (SLFP) and the Janatha Vimukthi Peramuna (JVP) formed the United People's Freedom Alliance (UPFA). The CPSL and LSSP joined the UPFA in February 2004. Gunasekera was appointed as a UPFA National List MP in the Sri Lankan Parliament following the 2004 parliamentary election. Gunasekera was put forward as the UPFA's candidate for Speaker but was defeated by opposition candidate W. J. M. Lokubandara after three dramatic rounds of voting in Parliament. Gunasekera was appointed Minister of Constitutional Reform in May 2004. He was given the additional portfolio of National Integration on 28 January 2007.

Gunasekera was re-appointed as a UPFA National List MP following the 2010 parliamentary election. He was appointed Minister of Rehabilitation and Prison Reforms after the election. He was promoted to Senior Minister of Human Resources in November 2010. He lost his cabinet position following the 2015 presidential election.

At the 2015 parliamentary election Gunasekera was placed on the UPFA's list of National List candidates. However, after the election he was not appointed to the National List.

== Electoral history ==
Electoral history of D. E. W. Gunasekera
| Election | Constituency | Party | Votes | Result |
|---|---|---|---|---|
| 1989 parliamentary | Matara District | USA | 2,735 | Not elected |
