= Eduardo Lorier =

Uruguayan politician

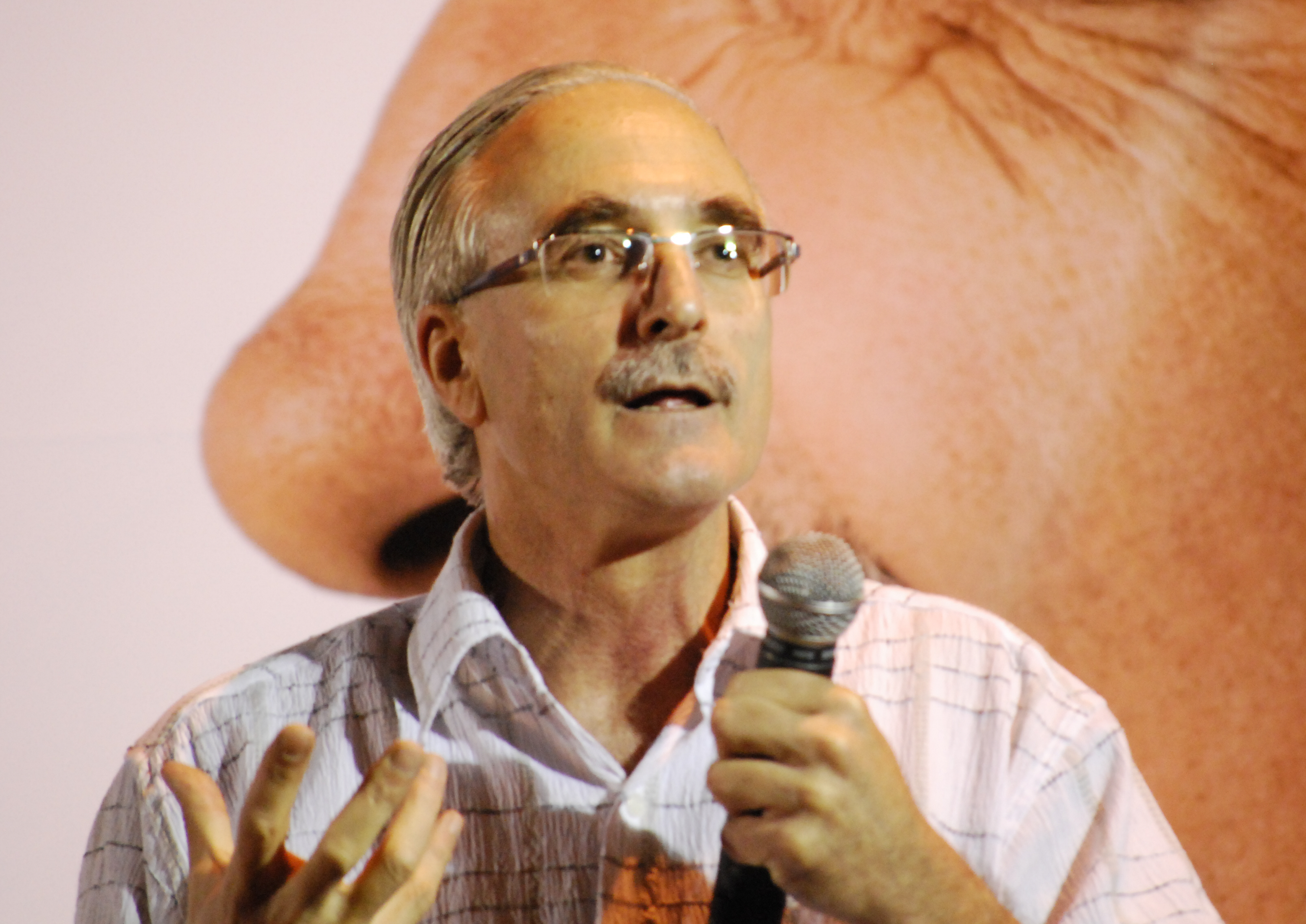
Senator Eduardo Lorier.

Eduardo Lorier Sandro (born 10 September 1952 in Florida, Uruguay) is a Uruguayan agronomist and politician.

He was the leader of Communist Party of Uruguay from 2006 to 2017 and a Senator from 2005 to 2010.
