= Selma Gürkan =

Turkish politician (born 1961)

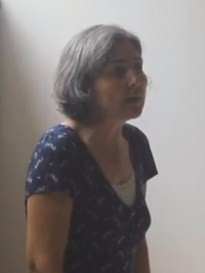

Chairwoman of the Labour Party
- In office 17 May 2023 – 24 December 2023
- Preceded by: Ercüment Akdeniz
- Succeeded by: Seyit Aslan
- In office 21 May 2011 – 22 November 2020
- Preceded by: Abdullah Levent Tüzel
- Succeeded by: Ercüment Akdeniz

Personal details
- Born: 1961 (age 64–65) Ankara, Turkey
- Party: Labour Party (EMEP)
- Occupation: Politician, unionist

Selma Gürkan (1961) is a Turkish unionist and politician.

In 2015 Gürkan made a joint statement with Peoples' Democratic Party (HDP) leaders Selahattin Demirtaş and Figen Yüksekdağ addressing the perceived threats to political freedom in advance of the November elections, in which they called for a commitment to democratic rights.

In February 2018 Gürkan made a speech criticising Turkey's invasion of Afrin, Syria, and was arrested and held under charges of "spreading terrorist propaganda", for which she faces a possible prison sentence of 7 years. 15 other members of the party were arrested but later released for sharing anti-war in Afrin sentiments through social media posts. EMEP was itself banned in 2018 from putting up candidates for local election by the Supreme Electoral Council (YSK). Gürkan is quoted as saying the move was "totally arbitrary and antidemocratic," and the wider campaign of arrests as a threat to freedom of speech.
