= Óscar Figuera González =

Venezuelan politician

Oscar Figuera González
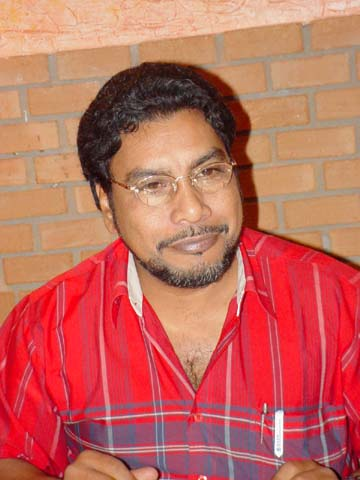

Secretary General of the Communist Party of Venezuela
- Incumbent
- Assumed office 29 July 1996
- Preceded by: Trino Meleán

Deputy of the National Assembly
- In office 5 January 2021 – 5 January 2026
- Constituency: National List
- In office 5 January 2011 – 5 January 2021
- Constituency: Guárico State
- In office 5 January 2006 – 5 January 2011
- Constituency: Aragua State

Deputy of the Latin American Parliament for Venezuela
- In office 5 January 2016 – 5 January 2021

Personal details
- Born: Óscar Ramón Figuera González; 6 October 1954 (age 71) Tucupita, Delta Amacuro, Venezuela
- Party: Communist Party of Venezuela

Óscar Ramón Figuera González (born 6 October 1954) is a Venezuelan politician and General Secretary of the Communist Party of Venezuela (PCV).
