= Aleksandar Paunov =

Bulgarian politician (born 1949)

- Александър Паунов
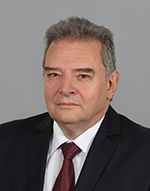
- Official portrait, 2017

Leader of Communist Party of Bulgaria

Member of the National Assembly
- In office 5 July 2001 – 17 June 2005
- In office 11 July 2005 – 25 June 2009
- In office 21 May 2013 – 5 August 2014
- In office 19 April 2017 – 26 March 2021

Personal details
- Born: Aleksandar Dimitrov Paunov; 19 June 1949 (age 76) Pazardzhik, PR Bulgaria
- Party: CPB

Aleksandar Dimitrov Paunov (Bulgarian: Александър Димитров Паунов) (born June 19, 1949), is a Bulgarian politician and the leader of the current Communist Party of Bulgaria.

He was born in Pazardzhik and became an economist. After the collapse of the Socialist Bloc in 1989, the Bulgarian Communist Party was renamed the Bulgarian Socialist Party and shed its Marxist-Leninist ideology by moving towards social democratic positions. Several factions broke off from the Bulgarian Socialist Party, one of them being named the Communist Party of Bulgaria, which is currently led by Paunov. It is a member of the Socialist-led Coalition for Bulgaria.

== Politics ==
Paunov is one of the only members of the Bulgarian National Assembly who voted against Bulgaria's entrance into NATO and the European Union. He also demanded the withdrawal of Bulgarian troops who were stationed in Karbala, Iraq.
