= 2011 Vietnamese legislative election =

- 22 May 2011

All 500 seats in the National Assembly 251 seats needed for a majority
- Turnout: 99.51%
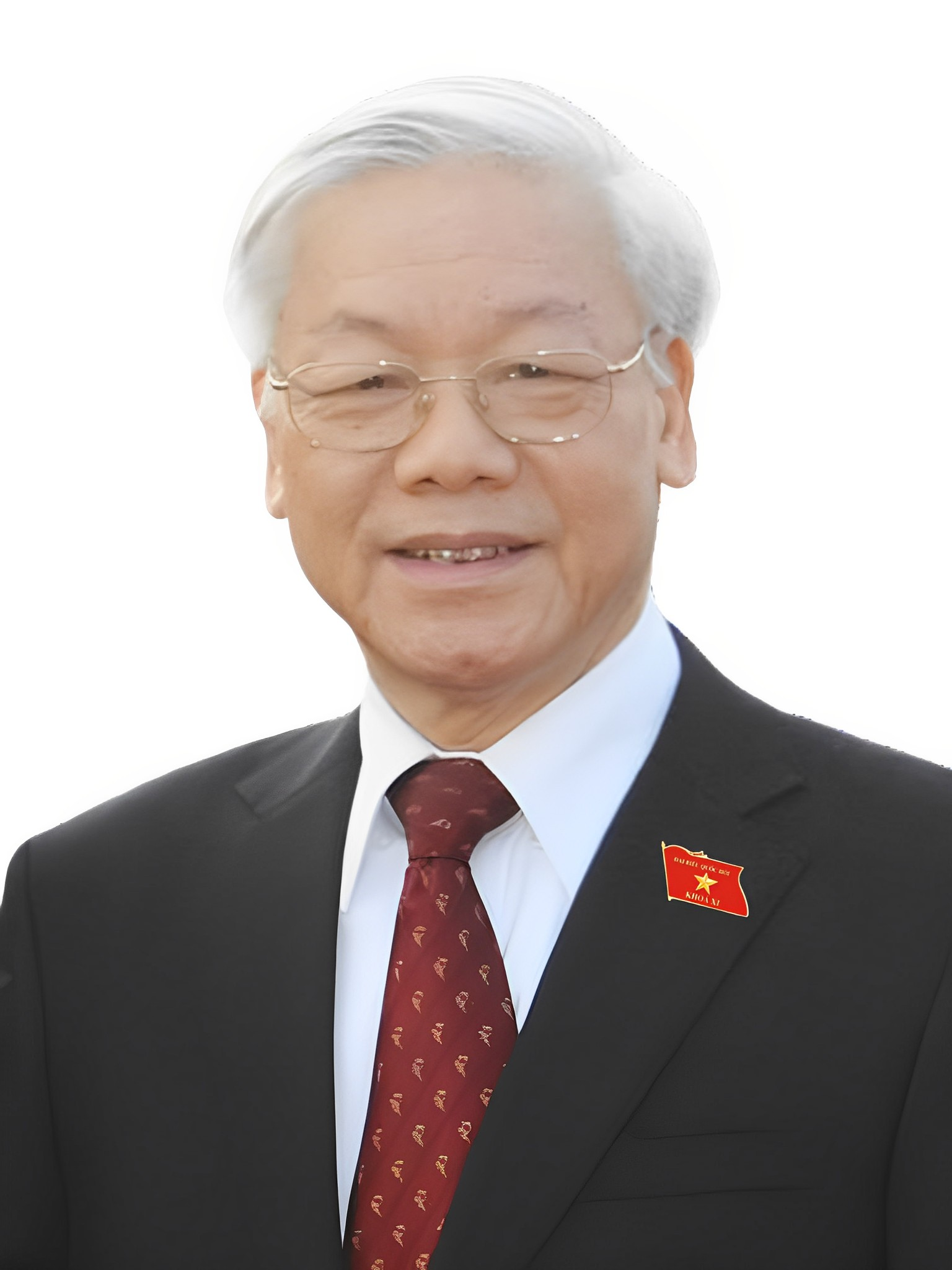

	First party	Second party
Leader	Nguyễn Phú Trọng	–
Party	Communist Party	Non-party & independents
Alliance	Fatherland Fr.	Fatherland Fr.
Last election	450	43
Seats won	454	46
Seat change	▲4	▲3
Prime Minister before election
Nguyễn Tấn Dũng
Elected Prime Minister
Nguyễn Tấn Dũng

Parliamentary elections were held in Vietnam on 22 May 2011. Since Vietnam is a single-party state, the ruling Communist Party of Vietnam was guaranteed to win a majority.

== Campaign ==
According to the Ministry of Home Affairs, there were 827 candidates. 31.4% were women, 14.3% were not members of the Communist Party, 16.1% were members of ethnic minorities and 22.1% were candidates running for reelection. Regardless of party standing, all candidates are evaluated by the Fatherland Front.

82 people applied to be self-nominated candidates, with the party officials eventually selecting a list of 15 self-nominated candidates running in the election. Despite this, Vietnam saw an increase of self-nominated candidates (82) in 2011 compared to 30 in 2007. Some pro-democracy and human rights activists were a part of the self-nominated group, who did not receive the required approval. These included lawyers Le Quoc Quan, a former fellow for the National Endowment for Democracy and Cu Huy Ha Vu and Le Cong Dinh, both sentenced to jail for security and propaganda risks against the state.

The 14 politburo seats were also up for election, though these elections were held in small electoral districts chosen by the party leaders. Thus, not all Vietnamese voters had a say in the politburo election decision.

== Results ==
During the 2011 election, Vietnam had an estimated 62,200,000 registered voters and of those registered 61,900,000 ballots were reportedly cast. Of the 500 members elected, 333 were first-time members and four were self-nominated. Almost all of them had at least a bachelor's degree; 15.6% were from ethnic minorities, 24.4% were women, and 8.4% were not members of the Communist Party. Non-party members, who managed to gain a seat in the National Assembly, include brother and sister duo Dang Thanh Tam and Dang Thi Hoang Yen from Saigon Investment Group.

Party	Votes	%	Seats	+/–
Communist Party of Vietnam			454	+4
Non-party members			42	0
Independents			4	+3
Total			500	+7
Total votes	61,965,651	–		
Registered voters/turnout	63,000,000	98.36		
Source: IPU

== Aftermath ==
Following the elections, on 25 July the new National Assembly elected Trương Tấn Sang as the new president, with 483 of the 496 National Assembly members voting for him.
