= Henrik Stamer Hedin =

Danish communist and translator

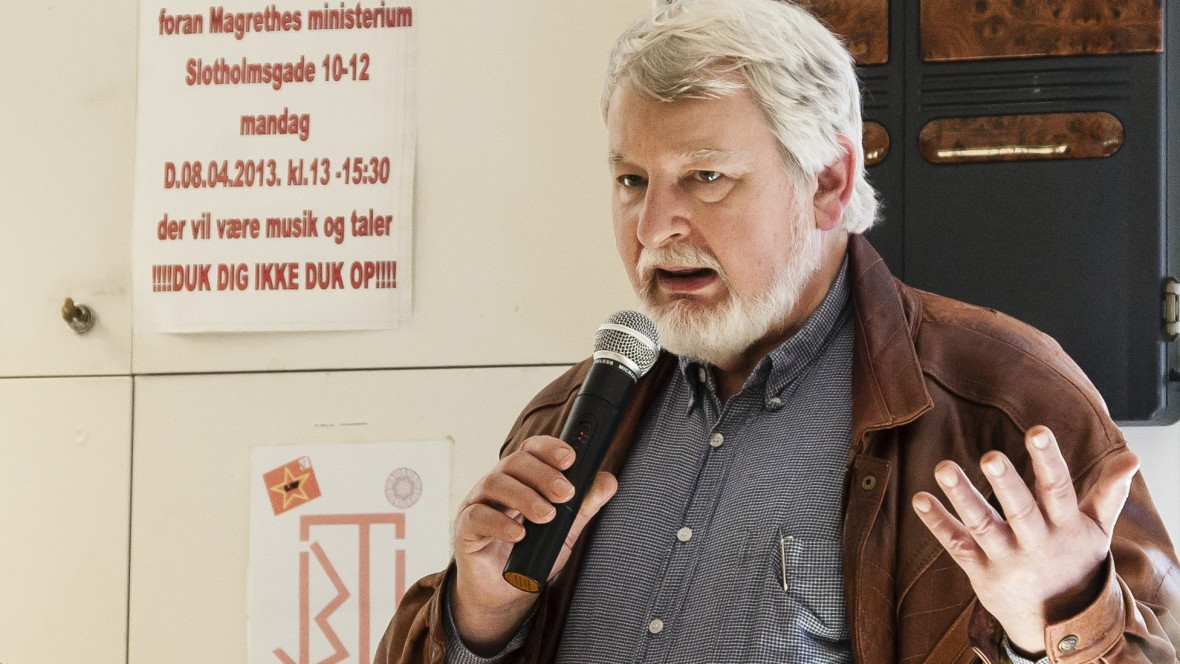
Henrik talking during conference.

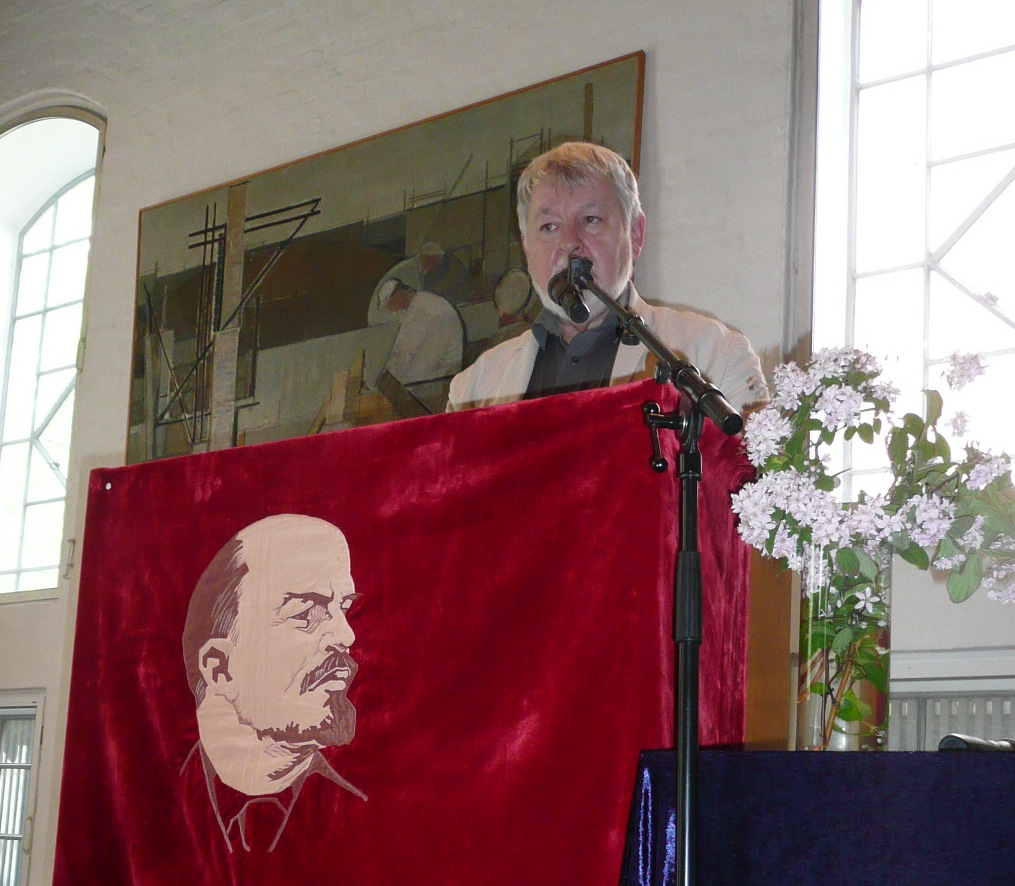
Henrik addressing the assembly at their headquarters for his comrades.

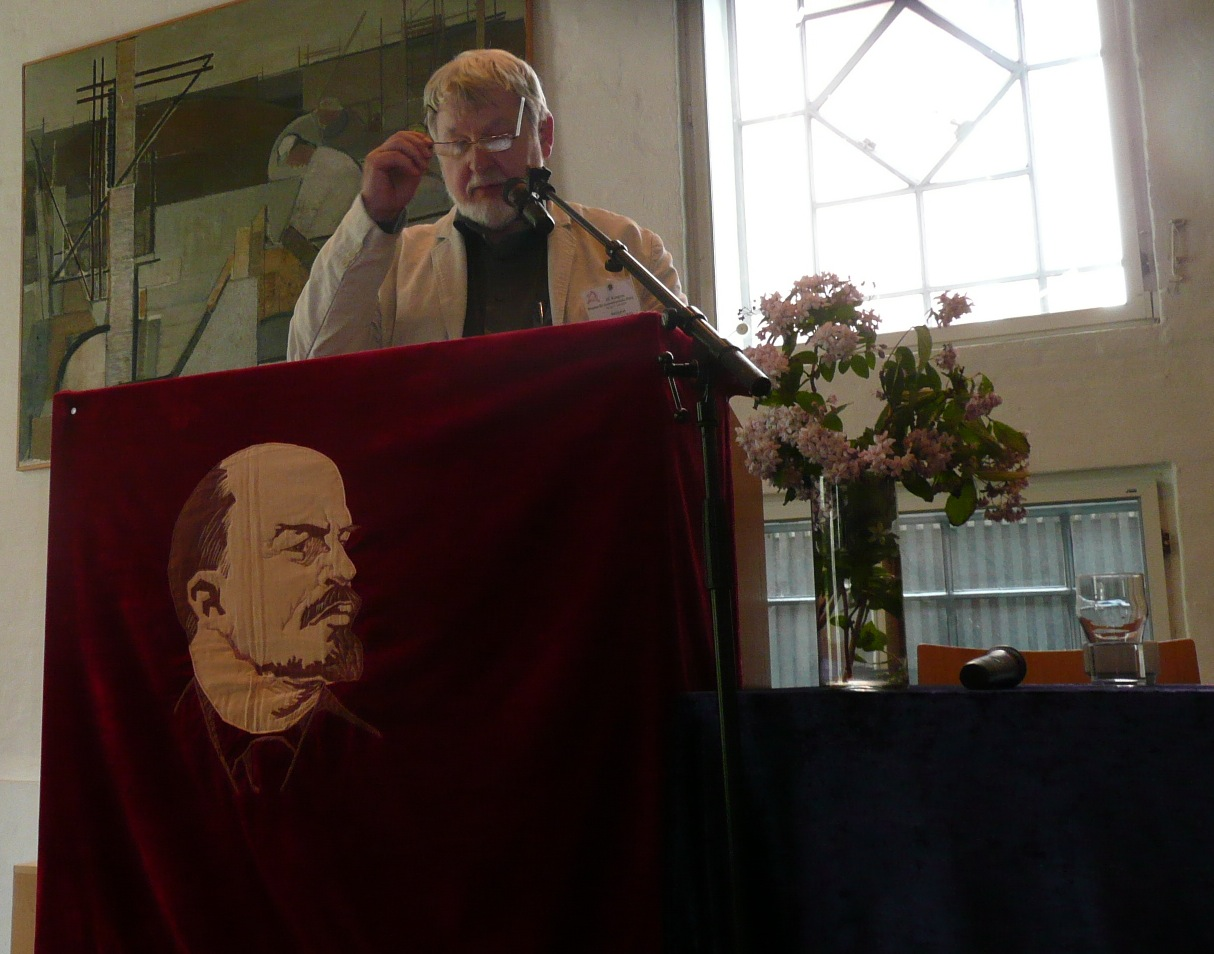
Henrik Stamer Hedin in 2012.

Henrik Stamer Hedin (born 10 July 1946) is a Danish communist, translator and former chairman of Communist Party of Denmark (DKP) until 2024 and also former editor of DKP's fromer party newspaper Skub. He was chosen for the DKP's executive committee for the first time in 1993. At DKP's 33rd congress, held in 2012, he was reelected to the executive committee and subsequently reelected as chairman of the party and the new executive committee.

Henrik Stamer Hedin is a vocal critic of imperialism. While raised as a political conservative, Hedin became a Marxist and joined the Communist Party of Denmark.
