= Patricio Echegaray =

Argentine politician (1946–2017)

Patricio Echegaray (17 October 1946 – 9 August 2017) was an Argentine politician. He was born in San José de Jáchal, Argentina. He served as General Secretary of the Communist Party of Argentina from 1986 until his death in 2017. Before, Echegaray served as the 26th General Secretary of the Juvenile Communist Federation from 1980 through 1985. He was a member of the Buenos Aires City Legislature from 2000 to 2003.

Echegaray died of pancreatic cancer on 9 August 2017 in Buenos Aires at the age of 70.

== See also ==
- Communist Party of Argentina (Extraordinary Congress)

== Other websites ==
- Official website
