= Renato Rabelo =

Brazilian politician (1942–2026)

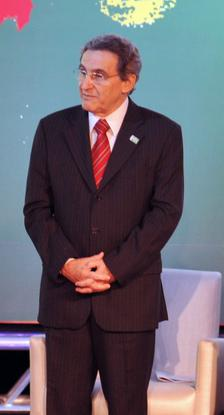

National president of PCdoB
- In office December 11, 2001 – May 31, 2015
- Preceded by: João Amazonas
- Succeeded by: Luciana Santos

Personal details
- Born: February 22, 1942 Ubaíra, Bahia, Brazil
- Died: February 15, 2026 (aged 83)
- Party: PCdoB (1962–2026)
- Occupation: Physician
- Profession: Politician

José Renato Rabelo (February 22, 1942 – February 15, 2026) was a Brazilian politician and physician. He was the national president of the Communist Party of Brazil from 2001 to 2015. In 1965 he was the president of the Union of Students of Bahia, but his management was interrupted by the military regime, forcing him to live in clandestinity. Rabelo died on February 15, 2026, at the age of 83.
