= World Federation of Democratic Youth =

International left-wing youth organisation

- Formation: 10 November 1945; 80 years ago, London, United Kingdom
- Headquarters: Budapest, Hungary
- President: Gonçalo Lopes (JCP)
- Secretary General: Suniel Sosa (UJC)
- Website: www.wfdy.org

The World Federation of Democratic Youth (WFDY) is an international youth organization, and has historically characterized itself as left-wing and anti-imperialist. WFDY was founded in London, United Kingdom, in 1945 as a broad international youth movement, organized in the context of the end of World War II with the aim of uniting youth from the Allies behind an anti-fascist platform that was broadly pro-peace, anti-nuclear war, expressing friendship between youth of the capitalist and socialist nations. The Federation was mostly sponsored and influenced by the Soviet Union and the organization mostly united youths from the Eastern Bloc and Non-Aligned nations. The WFDY Headquarters are in Budapest, Hungary. The main event of WFDY is the World Festival of Youth and Students. The last festival was held in Sochi, Russia, in October 2017. It was one of the first organizations granted general consultative status with the United Nations Economic and Social Council.

== History ==
On 10 November 1945, the World Youth Conference, organized in London, founded the World Federation of Democratic Youth. This historic conference was convened at the initiative of the World Youth Council which was formed during the Second World War to bring together the youth movements of the allied nations in an anti-fascist front. The conference was attended by over 600 delegates from 63 nations, it was at the time the largest and most diverse gathering of international youth. The conference adopted a pledge for peace. The WFDY was an indirect successor of the World Youth Congress Movement of the 1930s, a popular front of youth of a broad range of political tendencies, from religious to secular, liberal, socialist, and communist, which attempted to advocate a progressive programme and promote world peace.

Shortly after the 1945 World Youth Conference, with the onset of the Cold War and Winston Churchill's Iron Curtain speech, the organization was accused by the US State Department of being a "Moscow front". Many of the founding organizations quit, leaving mostly youth from socialist nations, national liberation movements, and communist youth. Like the International Union of Students (IUS) and other pro-Soviet organizations, the WFDY became a target and victim of CIA espionage as well as part of active measures conducted by the Soviet state security.

The WFDY's first General Secretary, Alexander Shelepin, was a former leader of the Young Communist International which had been dissolved in 1943. Shelepin had been a guerilla fighter during World War II (after his work with the WFDY, he was appointed Chairman of the Soviet KGB). Both the WFDY and IUS vocally criticized the Marshall Plan, supported the Czechoslovak coup d'état of 1948 and the new people's republics in eastern Europe. They opposed the Korean War.

The main event of the WFDY became the World Festival of Youth and Students, a large-scale political and cultural celebration which aimed to promote peace and friendship between the youth of the world. Most, but not all, of the early festivals were held in socialist nations in Europe. During the 1960s, 1970s, and 1980s the WFDY's festivals were one of the few places where young people from the western bloc could meet youth involved in the campaign against apartheid from South Africa, or militant youth from Vietnam, Palestine, Cuba and other nations. Famous people who participated in festivals included Angela Davis, Yuri Gagarin, Yasser Arafat, Fidel Castro, Vladimir Putin, Ruth First, Jan Myrdal and Nelson Mandela.

When the Soviet Union and the Eastern Bloc collapsed, the WFDY entered a crisis. With the power vacuum left by the collapse of the most important member organization, the Soviet Komsomol, there were conflicting views of the future character of the organization. Some wanted a more apolitical structure, whereas others were more inclined to an openly leftist federation. The WFDY, however, survived this crisis, and is today an active international youth organization that holds regular activities.

== Pledge ==
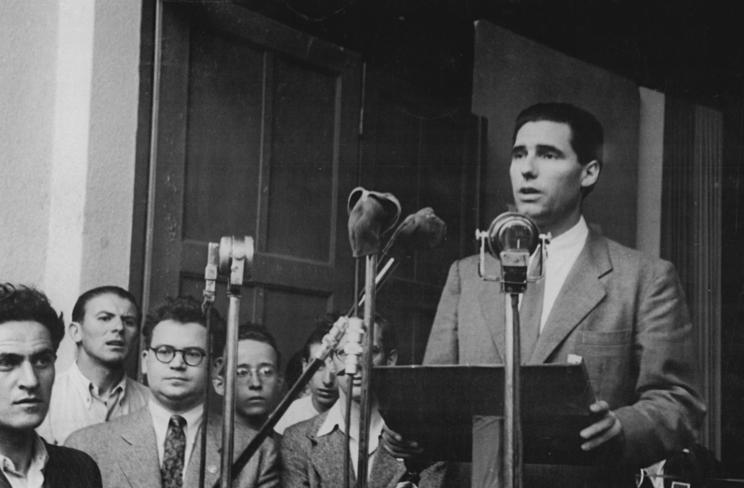
Guy de Boisson, President of the World Federation of Democratic Youth, speaks at the opening of the 2nd World Festival of Youth and Students (Budapest, 1949).

We pledge that we shall remember this unity, forged in this month, November 1945

Not only today, not only this week, this year, but always Until we have built the world we have dreamed of and fought for We pledge ourselves to build the unity of youth of the world All races, all colors, all nationalities, all beliefs To eliminate all traces of fascism from the earth To build a deep and sincere international friendship among the peoples of the world To keep a just lasting peace To eliminate want, frustration and enforced idleness

We have come to confirm the unity of all youth salute our comrades who have died-and pledge our word that skilful hands, keen brains and young enthusiasm shall never more be wasted in war

— Pledge of the World Federation of Democratic Youth

== General Assembly ==
The WFDY conducts a General Assembly every four years, the last taking place in Nicosia in 2019. During the Assembly, leadership and a General Council are elected and an organizational declaration is approved.

== Member organizations ==
Map of countries which have or had a youth organization in the World Federation of Democratic Youth. Countries with active member organizations of WFDY are shown in dark green. Countries with former member organizations of WFDY are shown in light green.

=== Africa ===
Country	Name	Notes	Ref
Angola	Juventude do Movimento Popular da Libertação de Angola	Youth wing of MPLA	
Benin	Organization of Revolutionary Youth (OJRB)		
Benin	Independent Socialist Youth Union (USJIB)		
Burundi	JRR Burundi		
Cape Verde	Youth of PAICV	Youth wing of PAICV	
Comoros	Front of Socialist Youth (FSY)		
Congo	UJS Congo		
Congo, Dem. Rep.	PPRD Youth League	Youth wing of the People's Party for Reconstruction and Democracy	
Eritrea	National Union of Eritrean Youth and Students		
Ethiopia	Ethiopian Youth League		
Ghana	Democratic Youth League of Ghana		
Ghana	African Youth Command		
Guinea Bissau	African Youth Amílcar Cabral	Youth wing of PAICG	
Lesotho	LYF Lesotho		
Madagascar	KDTM Madagascar		
Malawi	LYM Malawi		
Malawi	YASED Malawi		
Mozambique	Mozambican Youth Organisation	Youth wing of FRELIMO	
Namibia	SWAPO Party Youth League	Youth wing of SWAPO	
Namibia	Namibia National Students Organisation (NANSO)		
Nigeria	National Youth Council of Nigeria		
Nigeria	National Youth Council of the Ogoni People (NYCOP)		
Sao Tome	JML São Tomé and Príncipe		
Senegal	Mouvement de la Jeunesse Démocratique	Youth wing of the Democratic League/Movement for the Labour Party	
Senegal	Democratic Youth Union Alboury Ndiaye	Youth wing of the Party of Independence and Work	
Sierra Leone	SFYO Sierra Leone		
South Africa	African National Congress Youth League	Youth wing of the African National Congress	
South Africa	South African Students Congress		
South Africa	Young Communist League of South Africa	Youth wing of the South African Communist Party	
Sudan	Sudanese Youth Union	Youth wing of the Sudanese Communist Party	
Tanzania	Umoja Wa Vijana	Youth wing of Chama Cha Mapinduzi	
Zambia	United National Independence Party Youth League	Youth wing of the United National Independence Party	
Zimbabwe	ZANU-PF Youth League	Youth wing of ZANU-PF	
Zimbabwe	Zimbabwe Congress of Students Union (ZICOSU)		

=== Asia and the Pacific ===
Country	Name	Notes	Ref
Armenia	Young Communist League Armenia	Youth wing of the Armenian Communist Party	
Australia	Resistance: Young Socialist Alliance	Youth wing of the Socialist Alliance	
Azerbaijan	Young Communist League Azerbaijan	Youth wing of the Azerbaijan Communist Party	
Bangladesh	Socialist Students' Front	Student wing of the Socialist Party of Bangladesh	
Bangladesh	Bangladesh Students Union	Mass organization of Communist Party of Bangladesh	
Bangladesh	Bangladesh Youth Union	Youth wing of the Communist Party of Bangladesh	
Bhutan	Democratic Youth of Bhutan	Youth wing of the Bhutan National Democratic Party	
Bhutan	Students Union of Bhutan		
Cambodia	Youth Association of Cambodia		
Georgia	Young Communist League of Georgia		
India	All India Students Federation	Student wing of the Communist Party of India	
India	All India Youth Federation	Youth wing of the Communist Party of India	
Iran	Tudeh Youth	Youth wing of the Tudeh Party of Iran	
Japan
Japan	Japan League of Socialist Youth		
Japan	Korean Youth League in Japan (Chochong) (Note: Not to be confused with Korean Youth League in Japan (Hancheong), the youth wing of the Union for Korean Democratic Reunification in Japan.)	Youth wing of Chongryon	
Korea, DPR	Socialist Patriotic Youth League	Youth wing of the Workers' Party of Korea	
Korea, Rep.	7th-term Hanchongryun		
Laos	Lao People's Revolutionary Youth Union	Youth wing of the Lao People's Revolutionary Party	
Mongolia	Mongolian Youth Federation		
Myanmar	All Burma Students' Democratic Front		
Myanmar	All Burma Students League		
Nepal	All Nepal National Free Students Union	Student wing of the Communist Party of Nepal (Unified Marxist–Leninist)	
Nepal	Youth Federation Nepal	Youth wing of the Communist Party of Nepal (Unified Socialist)	
Nepal	Nepal National Federation of Students	Student wing of the Nepal Communist Party (United)	
Nepal	Nepal National Youth Federation	Youth wing of the Nepal Communist Party (United)	
Pakistan	Democratic Students Federation	student wing of the Communist Party of Pakistan	
Philippines	Anakbayan		
Philippines	Bukluran sa Ikauunlad ng Sosyalistang Isip at Gawa (BISIG)		
Philippines	SIKAP Philippines		
Philippines	YDM Philippines		
Sri Lanka	Communist Youth Federation	Youth wing of the Communist Party of Sri Lanka	
Sri Lanka	Sri Lanka National Union Of Students	Student wing of the Communist Party of Sri Lanka	
Sri Lanka	Federation of All Lanka (Ceylon) Youth League	Youth wing of Mahajana Eksath Peramuna	
Sri Lanka	Socialist Students Union	Student wing of Janatha Vimukthi Peramuna	
Sri Lanka	Socialist Youth Union	Youth wing of Janatha Vimukthi Peramuna	
Vietnam	Ho Chi Minh Communist Youth Union	Youth wing of the Communist Party of Vietnam	
Vietnam	Vietnam Youth Federation		

=== Europe and North America ===
Country	Name	Notes	Ref
Austria	Communist Youth of Austria		
Belgium	COMAC	Youth wing of the Workers' Party of Belgium	
Bulgaria	Bulgarian Socialist Youth Union		
Canada	Young Communist League of Canada	Affiliated with the Communist Party of Canada	
Croatia	Young Socialists of Croatia	Youth wing of the Socialist Labour Party of Croatia	
Czech Republic	Communist Youth Union		
Cyprus	United Democratic Youth Organisation	Youth wing of the Progressive Party of Working People	
Denmark	Communist Youth of Denmark		
Finland	Communist Youth League		
France	Mouvement Jeunes Communistes de France		
Germany	Free German Youth		
Germany	Socialist German Workers Youth	Youth wing of the German Communist Party	
Greece	Communist Youth of Greece	Youth wing of the Communist Party of Greece	
Hungary	Baloldali Front	Youth wing of the Hungarian Workers' Party	
Ireland	Connolly Youth Movement		
Ireland	Workers' Party Youth	Youth wing of the Workers' Party	
Italy	Front of the Communist Youth	Youth wing of the Communist Front	
Italy	Giovani Comuniste e Comunisti	Youth wing of the Communist Refoundation Party	
Republic of Moldova	Young Communist League of the Republic of Moldova	Youth wing of the Party of Communists of the Republic of Moldova	
Netherlands	Communist Youth Movement of the Netherlands	Youth wing of the Communist Party of the Netherlands	
Norway	Young Communists in Norway	Youth wing of the Communist Party of Norway	
Norway	Young Communist League of Norway		
Portugal	Portuguese Communist Youth	Youth wing of the Portuguese Communist Party	
Romania	Union of Socialist Youth	Youth wing of the Romanian Socialist Party	
Russia	Leninist Communist Youth Union of the Russian Federation	Youth wing of the Communist Party of the Russian Federation	
Russia	Revolutionary Communist Youth League (b)	Youth wing of the Russian Communist Workers' Party of the Communist Party of the Soviet Union	
Russia	Russian Young Communist League		
Serbia	Young Communist League of Yugoslavia	Youth wing of the New Communist Party of Yugoslavia	
Slovakia	Socialistický Zväz Mladých	Youth wing of the Communist Party of Slovakia	
Spain	Collectives of Communist Youth	Youth wing of the Communist Party of the Workers of Spain	
Spain	Communist Youth Union of Spain	Youth wing of the Communist Party of Spain	
Spain	Communist Youth of Catalonia	Youth wing of the Communists of Catalonia	
Sweden	Communist Youth of Sweden	Youth wing of the Communist Party of Sweden	
Switzerland	Communist Youth of Switzerland	Youth wing of the Swiss Party of Labour	
United Kingdom	Young Communist League	Youth wing of the Communist Party of Britain	
United States	Young Communist League	Youth wing of the Communist Party USA	
United States	Young Socialists	Youth wing of the Socialist Workers Party (United States)	

=== Latin America and Caribbean ===
Country	Name	Notes	Ref
Argentina	Federación Juvenil Comunista	Youth wing of the Communist Party of Argentina	
Barbados	League of Progressive Youth		
Bolivia	Juventud Comunista de Bolivia	Youth wing of the Communist Party of Bolivia	
Brazil	Juventude Comunista Avançando	Youth wing of the Polo Comunista Luiz Carlos Prestes	
Brazil	União da Juventude Comunista	Youth wing of the Brazilian Communist Party	
Brazil	União da Juventude Socialista	Youth wing of the Communist Party of Brazil	
Chile	Juventudes Comunistas de Chile	Youth wing of the Communist Party of Chile	
Colombia	Colombian Communist Youth	Youth wing of the Colombian Communist Party	
Costa Rica	Juventud Frente Amplio	Youth wing of the Broad Front (Costa Rica)	
Cuba	Unión de Jóvenes Comunistas	Youth wing of the Communist Party of Cuba	
Ecuador	Juventud Comunista del Ecuador	Youth wing of the Communist Party of Ecuador	
Ecuador	Juventud Socialista Ecuatoriana	Youth wing of the Socialist Party of Ecuador	
El Salvador	Farabundo Martí Youth	Youth wing of the Farabundo Martí National Liberation Front	
Guatemala	Juventud URNG	Youth wing of the Guatemalan National Revolutionary Unity	
Guyana	Guyana Youth and Students Movement		
Guyana	Walter Rodney Youth Movement		
Mexico	Federation of Young Communists	Youth wing of the Communist Party of Mexico	
Mexico	Juventud Popular Socialista	Youth wing of the Popular Socialist Party	
Nicaragua	Juventud Sandinista 19 de Julio	Youth wing of the Frente Sandinista de Liberación Nacional	
Panama	JPR Panama		
Paraguay	Juventud Comunista Paraguaya	Youth wing of the Partido Comunista Paraguayo	
Peru	Juventud Comunista Peruana	Youth wing of the Peruvian Communist Party	
Uruguay	Juventud del Movimiento 26 de Marzo	Youth wing of the 26 March Movement	
Venezuela	Juventud Comunista de Venezuela	Youth wing of the Communist Party of Venezuela	
Venezuela	United Socialist Party of Venezuela Youth	Youth wing of the United Socialist Party of Venezuela	

=== North Africa and Middle East ===
Country	Name	Notes	Ref
Algeria	Union de la Jeunesse Algérienne	Youth wing of the National Liberation Front	
Algeria	National Union of Algerian Students	Students of the National Liberation Front	
Bahrain	Shabeeba Society of Bahrain	Youth wing of the Progressive Democratic Tribune	
Egypt	Union of Progressive Youth of Egypt	Youth wing of the National Progressive Unionist Rally Party	
Iraq	Iraqi Democratic Youth Federation	Youth wing of the Iraqi Communist Party	
Iraq	General Union of Students in Iraqi Republic		
Israel	Young Communist League of Israel	Youth wing of the Communist Party of Israel, affiliated with Hadash and the Joint List	
Jordan	Union of Democratic Youth	Youth wing of the Jordanian Communist Party	
Kuwait	Democratic Youth Union	Youth wing of the Kuwaiti Progressive Movement	
Lebanon	Union of Lebanese Democratic Youth	Youth wing of the Lebanese Communist Party	
Libya	National Youth Organization of Libya		
Morocco	USFP Jeunesse Ittihadiya	Youth wing of the Socialist Union of Popular Forces	
Morocco	Jeunesse Socialiste	Youth wing of the Party of Progress and Socialism	
Palestine	General Union of Palestine Students		
Palestine	Palestinian Democratic Youth Union	Youth wing of the Democratic Front for the Liberation of Palestine	
Sahrawi Republic	Sahrawi Youth Union	Youth wing of the Polisario Front	
Turkey	Progressive Youth Association	Youth wing of the Communist Party of Turkey	
Yemen	ASHEED Yemen		
Yemen	Yemen Youth General Union		

=== Former members ===
- Afghanistan - Democratic Youth Organization of Afghanistan
- People's Socialist Republic of Albania - Bashkimi i Rinisë së Punës së Shqipërisë
- Argentina - Juventud Intrasigente Argentina
- Argentina - Juventud Socialista Auténtica
- Australia - Eureka Youth League
- Belgium - Graffiti Jeugendsdienst
- Belgium - Jeunesse Communiste de Belgique
- Bolivia - Confederación Universitaria Boliviana
- Brazil - Juventude do PCB
- Bulgaria - Dimitrov Communist Youth Union
- Byelorussian SSR - Leninist Communist Youth Union of Belarus
- Cambodia - People's Revolutionary Youth Union of Kampuchea
- Cameroon - Jeunesse Démocratique du Cameroun
- Chile - Juventud de la Izquierda Cristiana de Chile
- Chile - Juventud del MIR
- Chile - Juventud Rebelde Miguel Enríquez
- Chile - Unión de Jóvenes Socialistas
- China - Communist Youth League of China
- China - All-China Youth Federation
- Colombia - Federación Juvenil Obrera
- Colombia - Juventud de la Alianza Nacional Popular
- Colombia - Juventud del Poder Popular
- Colombia - Unión Nacional de los Estudiantes Secundarios
- Colombia - Unión de Jóvenes Patriotas
- Congo - Union de la jeunesse congolaise
- Costa Rica - Juventud del Pueblo Costarriquense
- Costa Rica - Juventudes Patrióticas
- Costa Rica - Juventud Vanguardista Costarriquense
- Czechoslovakia - Union of Czech Youth
- Czechoslovakia - Union of Slovak Youth
- Czechoslovakia - Czechoslovak Youth Union
- Czechoslovakia - Czechoslovak Socialist Youth Union
- Dominican Republic - Juventud Revolucionaria Dominicana
- Dominican Republic - Unión Democrática Orlando Martínez
- Ecuador - Departamento Juvenil del Central de Trabajadores de Ecuador
- Ecuador - Juventud Comunista de Ecuador
- El Salvador - Asociación General de Estudiantes Universitarios de El Salvador
- Faroe Islands - Føroyskir Sosialistar
- Finland - Democratic Youth League of Finland
- Finland - Finnish Union of Democratic Pioneers
- Germany - Socialist Youth League Karl Liebknecht
- Greece - Greek Communist Youth (Internal)
- Grenada - Maurice Bishop Youth Movement
- Guadeloupe - Union de la Jeunesse Communiste Guadeloupe
- France - Union nationale des étudiants de france-Solidarité Etudiante
- Guatemala - Juventud Patriótica del Trabajo
- Guyana - Young Socialist Movement
- Haiti - Jeunesse Communiste de Haiti
- Honduras - Federación de la Juventud Comunista
- Iceland - Revolutionary Communist Youth League
- Indonesia - People's Youth (Indonesia)
- Italy - Italian Communist Youth Federation
- Jamaica - Young Communist League of the Workers' Party (Workers Party of Jamaica)
- Japan - Democratic Youth League of Japan
- Luxembourg - Jeunesse Communiste Luxembourgoise
- Martinique - Union de la Jeunesse Communiste Martinique
- Mexico - Frente Juvenil Revolucionario
- Mexico - Juventud Socialista de los Trabajadores
- Mongolia - Revolutionary Youth League (REVSOMOL)
- Morocco - Istiqlal Party Youth
- Netherlands - Algemeen Nederlands Jeugd Verbond
- Hungary - Kommunista Ifjúsági Szövetség
- Panama - Juventud del PRD
- Panama - Juventud Popular Revolucionaria
- Paraguay - Federación Juvenil Comunista de Paraguay
- Peru - CGTP Sección Juvenil
- Peru - Juventud Aprista Peruana
- Peru - Juventud Mariateguista
- Poland - Związek Socjalistycznej Młodzieży Polskiej
- Puerto Rico - Federación Universitaria para la Indpendencia
- Puerto Rico - Juventud Comunista de Puerto Rico
- Puerto Rico - Juventud Socialista de Puerto Rico
- San Marino - Federazione Giovanile Comunista San Marino
- Saudi Arabia - Union of Democratic Youth in Saudi
- Sri Lanka - Congress of Sama Samaja Youth Leagues
- Sri Lanka - Federation of Communist and Progressive Youth
- Saint Vincent and the Grenadines - Vanguard Youth Organization
- Surinam - National Youth Movement (Suriname)
- Sweden - Ung Vänster (1975–1992)
- Switzerland - Jeunesse Communiste Suisse
- Ba'athist Syria - Revolutionary Youth Union
- Ba'athist Syria - Union of Democratic Youth of Syria-Khaled Baghdash
- Ba'athist Syria - Syrian Democratic Youth Union
- Tunisia - Destourian Youth
- Turkey - İlerici Gençler Derneği
- Ukraine - Komsomol of Ukraine
- United States - Young Socialist Alliance
- Uruguay - Juventud Socialista del Uruguay
- USSR - Committee of Youth Organizations of the USSR
- USSR - All-Union Leninist Young Communist League (Komsomol)
- Venezuela - Juventud Socialista-MEP
- Yugoslavia - League of Socialist Youth of Yugoslavia

=== Observers ===
- Youth for Communist Rebirth In France (Youth of the Pole of Communist Rebirth in France)
- Communist Youth of Luxemburg (Refounded youth organisation of the Communist Party of Luxembourg), Luxembourg
- Revolutionary Communist Youth (Youth organization of the Communist Party), Sweden

== See also ==
- Christian Peace Conference
- International Association of Democratic Lawyers
- International Federation of Resistance Fighters – Association of Anti-Fascists
- International Organization of Journalists
- International Union of Students
- Women's International Democratic Federation
- World Federation of Scientific Workers
- World Federation of Trade Unions
- World Peace Council
- World Youth Congress Movement - the 1930s precursor to the WFDY
