= Blekingegade Gang =

Danish group of politically motivated criminal activists

The Blekinge Street Gang
- Dates active: 1972–1989
- Active regions: Denmark; Sweden
- Ideology: Communism; Marxism-Leninism; Mao Zedong Thought
- Status: Disbanded in 1989.
- Size: 5–10

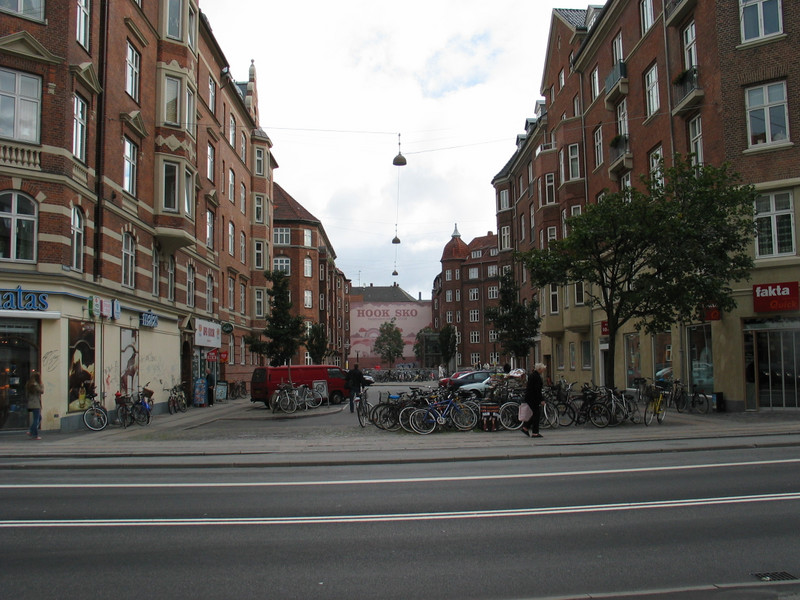
Blekingegade. Amager. 2004

The Blekinge Street Gang (Danish: Blekingegadebanden) was a Danish far-left criminal group. Between December 1972 and May 1989, they committed robberies and sent the money to the Popular Front for the Liberation of Palestine. One police officer was killed by the group during exchange of gunfire during their final robbery in 1988. The 1989 discovery of a large cache of their weapons and explosives in a hideout on Blekingegade ("Blekinge Street") gave the gang its press name. The gang referred to themselves as the inner core of three organizations named Kommunistisk Arbejdskreds, Kommunistisk Ungdoms Forbund, and Manifest-Kommunistisk Arbejdsgruppe.

== Modus operandi ==
All crimes after 1972 were committed to provide money or weapons to the Popular Front for the Liberation of Palestine (PFLP).

During the preparation phase, they maintained absolute secrecy, never said anything on the phone, made sure they were not followed, and did not tell their families. Each big heist was usually preceded by weeks or months of detailed planning, preparations and surveillance. The surveillance and stakeouts were usually done on foot or from the back of small, closed vans. When renting cars or apartments, they used stolen identities and false driver licenses, and made sure to avoid using the stolen identities in ways that would be noticed by the victims (such as spending their money). They routinely used professional countersurveillance techniques including spotting unmarked police cars, evasive driving and calling between payphones.

They concealed their identity by using full disguises, which included masks and theatrical makeup. They did not reveal their political affiliation or motives, nor perform public demonstrations of force or terror. During a crime, they never carried any identifying documents. They used freshly stolen getaway vehicles equipped with previously stolen unrelated license plates.

They used a quick in-out approach during robberies: most crimes were completed in a matter of seconds or minutes. They were extremely brutal during the crime to intimidate the victims and avoid casualties. Their goal was to take the loot and getaway cars without relying on the victims to do anything but flee or freeze.

== 1963—1970 ==
=== Political activities ===
In 1963, as a result of the Sino-Soviet split, the world's national communist parties split into pro-China (Maoist) and pro-USSR factions. The official Communist Party of Denmark (DKP) sided with Moscow. That year, Gotfred Appel unofficially founded the Communist Task Force (KAK, Danish: Kommunistisk ArbejdsKreds) to move the DKP towards Marxist-Leninist-Maoist ideology, and he was expelled from the DKP in September 1963. That same month, Appel founded the publishing and printing company Futura, which took over a lucrative contract to translate and print the Danish language publications of the Chinese embassy. This contract was formerly held by the DKP newspaper Land og Folk, with Appel as the primary contact. Futura also became the publisher of the party newspaper Communist Briefing (Danish: Kommunistisk Orientering) and other publications of KAK. Futura's biggest commercial success is the official Danish translation of Mao Zedong's Quotations from Chairman Mao Zedong. In December 1963, Appel formally founded KAK as a new independent "party". On February 8, 1965, KAK organized the first Danish "Vietnam demonstration" against the Vietnam War, and founded the first Danish "Vietnam committee" on January 14, 1966.

Appel's ideological theory was published in an extensive series of articles in Communist Briefing during 1966 and 1967. His "leech state theory" theorized that the rich countries make so much money by exploiting third world countries that even their "poorest" citizens are so rich they are effectively "bribed" into being part of the capitalist bourgeoisie and unlikely to participate in any Communist revolution until this source of wealth dried out due to liberation of the third world. Accordingly, western communists who really wanted a communist ideal state must first help liberate third world countries from western exploitation. This theory was the basis of all future activities in both the party and the gang. The theory was later published as a book. During the fall of 1967, Jens Holger Jensen became acquainted with Appel during a small one-man KAK-demonstration and almost immediately began helping out and soon joined KAK.

In September 1967, the Maoists left the youth wing of the DKP, (Communist Youth of Denmark, Danish: Danmarks Kommunistiske Ungdom (DKU)), and KAK created its own youth chapter, KUF, with its own newspaper The Young Communist (Danish: Ungkommunisten), on March 26, 1968. During 1968, the Maoists left KAK and formed the Communist Association Marxists - Lenininsts (KFML; Danish: Kommunistisk Forbund Marxister - Leninister), later renamed to the Communist Workers Party (KAP; Danish: Kommunistisk ArbejderParti). The Chinese embassy cancelled the publishing contract with Futura on July 30, 1969, as Appel insisted that the various student uprisings in the west were not the start of a new communist revolution, but merely internal strife in the bourgeoisie, from which new communists could be recruited. The official National People's Congress had passed a resolution to the contrary. From this point on, KAK was solely based on Marxism-Leninism and Appel's theories.

=== Criminal activities ===
KUF was a main participant in violent demonstrations against the Vietnam War on April 27, 1968, and against the John Wayne movie The Green Berets on May 5, 1969. PFLP was founded in the Middle East in December 1967, with a communist agenda for post-liberation Palestine. In October 1969, two KUF members were the first Westerners to train in PFLP training camps in Jordan: blacksmith Gert Rasmussen and toolsmith Hans "Xander" Truelsen. When PFLP wanted to train them for a specific operation, Rasmussen fled home to Denmark and was expelled from the KUF for "unreliable and indecent behaviour". Xander left the KUF before the real gang activity began in 1972.

From June to July 1970, Jensen, Peter Døllner and Jørgen Poulsen were in PFLP training camps in Lebanon and Jordan. During those months Carlos the Jackal was also trained in PFLP camps in Lebanon and Jordan, but may not have met the KUF members. Around the same time founders of the German RAF were also trained in Palestinian camps in the near Middle East, and Oevig said they also trained in PFLP camps, while later sources clarified that the RAF founders had rather trained in Fatah camps in Jordan. Appel and Ulla Hauton visited the PFLP in Jordan from September 1 to 22, 1970, including a visit to the site of the infamous triple Dawson's Field hijackings. They escaped the country just as the Jordan government struck back during Black September.

While Appel and Hauton were abroad, KUF attempted arson with Molotov cocktails on the Bella Center on September 8, 1970, in an unsuccessful attempt to prevent the 1970 World Bank Summit, and spearheaded violent demonstrations against the World Bank Summit from September 20 to 25. Gotfred Appel only avoided arrest as he could prove he was in Jordan at the time. Hans "Xander" Truelsen spent three weeks in prison. On November 21, 1970, Niels Jørgensen was arrested for pro-PFLP graffiti.

== 1970 to 1977 ==
=== Political activities ===
Inspired by the Canadian Liberation Support Movement, KAK founded the charity Clothes to Africa (TTA, Danish: Tøj til Afrika) in July 1972, collecting used clothing and other used items which they cleaned up and sent to refugee camps run by like-minded third-world liberation movements. The first shipment weighed 0.9 tons, and was shipped to the MPLA from Angola in 1972. They sent a further 8.7 tons to FRELIMO in Mozambique and PFLOAG in Oman in 1973, 4.7 tons to FRELIMO in 1974, 13.3 tons to MPLA, PFLO in Oman, and ZANU in Zimbabwe in 1975, 9.1 tons ZANU in 1976, and 27.3 tons to ZANU in 1977.

=== Criminal activities ===
To avoid further troubles with the police, KAK/KUF was converted from a very active group of violent demonstrators to a very secret underground cell in late 1970; led by Appel, Hauton and Jensen. The former top activist Hans "Xander" Truelsen refused to participate and left the organisation.

The gang allegedly staged a number of coups, and is suspected of robbing a transport of cash to the local branch of the unemployment fund of the Unskilled Workers Union on December 9, 1975. The amount robbed was 500,000 Danish krone (DKK) (US$81,000). On September 2, 1976, the gang allegedly robbed a transport of cash from a post office, which yielded DKK 550,000 (US$91,000). The gang allegedly used fake duplicate tax return money orders (each with a small realistic amount) and fake drivers licenses to defraud the Postal service of a total amount of DKK 1.4 million (US$240,000) on November 8, 1976).

Appel, Hauton, Jensen, and possibly another KAK member negotiated with Wadi Haddad in Baghdad, Iraq, in February 1977. There are two conflicting versions of these negotiations:

- In 1988–1989 Gottfred Appel told the police that those present were himself, Ulla Hauton, Jens Holger Jensen and Wadi Haddad (of those, only Gottfred Appel was alive at the time of the interrogation), and claimed that Wadi Haddad wanted KAK to assist in terrorist operations, but that KAK refused, although Jens Holger Jensen wanted to participate. In 2009, the gang claimed that this version of the story was intended to make the police believe that Appel would never participate in any crimes, but that the young breakaways in KA might do such things, while not incriminating any living persons.
- In 2008–2009, the gang claimed that those present were an undisclosed gang member, Gottfred Appel, Ulla Hauton, Jens Holger Jensen and Wadi Haddad (of those, only the undisclosed member was alive in 2008/2009). The meeting was to evaluate the political relevance of cooperating with Wadi Haddad's PFLP-EO in addition to George Habash's PFLP. Wadi Hadded did not want to discuss politics at all and all four KAK members agreed that PFLP-EO was too elitist and not rooted in the Palestinian people, and thus not worthy of KAK's cooperation.

In 1977, Jensen may have staked out Palma de Mallorca Airport in preparation of the joint PFLP/RAF Landshut Hijacking, according to the Appel account of the meeting with Haddad in February 1977.

== 1977 to 1988 Collective Liberation Support ==
=== Political activities ===
A grand meeting of the KAK membership expelled Hauton on May 4, 1978, and due to his insistence, also Appel. In the aftermath, Appel secured the legal rights to the name KAK, and the majority changed the name to Communist Workgroup (KA, Danish: Kommunistisk Arbejdsgruppe or M-KA, Danish: Manifest - Kommunistisk Arbejdsgruppe), the publishing company was renamed from Futura to Manifest, and the newspaper from Communist Briefing to Manifest. Where KAK had a single unchallenged leader, KA installed a collective leadership roughly consisting of active gang members. In August 1978, the majority split into two groups: KA focused on resuming interrupted legal and illegal activity, while the Marxist Workgroup (MAG, Danish: Marxistisk ArbejdsGruppe) focused on analysing the organisational failure and dissolved in 1980. KA was formally established on September 3, 1978.

From October to November 1979, the female doctor "Anna" volunteered in a Red Cross/PFLP refugee camp Nahr-El-Barred north of Tripoli, Lebanon. TTA continued operations and shipped about 70 tons of clothes to ZANU in 1978. As people began to sell their used items instead of donating it to charities, TTA was deemed unprofitable on November 17, 1986. It was closed down and efforts were redirected to a new fund-raising project: an all-volunteer café named Café Liberation, which opened for business in April 1987, but never managed to make a profit despite everybody working for free.

=== Criminal activities ===
PFLP Intelligence chief Marwan El-Fahoum had been assigned as KA's new primary PFLP contact in May 1979. On October 9, 1979, Jensen and Jørgensen faked a trip to the US to go underground for a year. Six days later nameless wanted posters for "person 1" and "person 2" were secretly circulated to Danish Police and possibly to some foreign agencies. On July 7, 1980, the gang allegedly kidnapped a bank manager and his family in their own home and tried to get access to the bank vault, but the plan failed and the family was released. The gang denies involvement and the charges were dropped before going to trial.

In July 1981, all of KA's members visited PFLP in Lebanon. From 1982 to 1984, Bo Weimann began compiling a file of potential Mossad operatives in Denmark. The file happened to include many Jews, but the group insisted that listing or killing Jews in general was never the goal, and it was for determining which ones were actively fighting for Mossad in a manner similar to KA's own relationship with the PFLP. It was ruled as espionage at trial. On April 2, 1982, the gang allegedly robbed postal workers carrying cash to a bank, yielding DKK 786,000 (US$96,000)) in cash and DKK 72 million in worthless checks. The gang allegedly robbed an armored van on March 2, 1983, and took DKK 8.3 million (US$960,000). No individual gang member was found guilty of the charge.

The gang broke into a Swedish army depot on November 9, 1982, stealing a large amount of heavy weaponry (mostly Swedish brands), including bazookas, anti-personnel mines, plastic explosives and boxes of ammunition, all with complete accessories. In February 1983, the gang allegedly staked out several Swedish police stations as potential targets for stealing light weaponry. The plan was dropped because they did not believe there were enough guns in each police station to justify the risk. In September 1983, the group made an alleged stakeout of a Norwegian army depot in the hope of repeating the success from the Swedish depot. The plans were dropped because transporting the previously obtained Swedish weapons to the PFLP on the West Bank had turned out to be too difficult. From 1984 to 1988, small consignments of stolen weapons were carefully packaged and literally buried in various forests near Vienna, Zürich and Paris for later pickup by PFLP or its allies. On September 3, 1986, a police informant led French police to one of the buried consignments of weapons near Paris. It was not discovered who buried the weapons, only that PFLP was the intended recipient.

With funding and practical assistance from PFLP, the gang planned and prepared between 1982 and 1985 to kidnap Jörn Rausing, son of industrialist Gad Rausing, from his home in Sweden, intending to demand a US$25 million ransom. The plan failed seconds before the grab on January 7, 1985, apparently because the original stakeout got the hinges on his front door wrong. PFLP pressured the gang to try again, but the stress from the long high-stakes preparations influenced the gang to abort the kidnapping.

On September 27, 1985, the gang moved its hideout to a new apartment on Blekinge Street in Copenhagen. The new hideout was rented under a fictitious computer club, and all documents were signed for with a stolen identity, while the bills were paid in cash to avoid alerting the person. On December 3, 1985, the gang robbed a money transport vehicle from a post office, taking DKK 1.5 million (US$160,000) in cash and DKK 68 million in cancelled checks. No individual gang member was found guilty for the charge. Jørgensen was arrested during an attempted car theft on June 3, 1986. The police pretended to believe his cover story and the charges were silently reduced to a fine to avoid arousing the gang's suspicions. On December 22, 1986, the gang stole the Christmas weekend stock of Danish clothing mega store Daells Varehus, as they were being picked up by a bank courier. During the escape, the gang fought off several shop employees, including the security chief (a former elite soldier) who sustained a fractured skull from a pistol whip. For their next robbery, the gang developed a new soft baton designed to prevent skull fractures. The robbery yielded about DKK 4.7 million (US$0.63 million) in cash, and no gang members were found guilty.

== 1988 Old Main Post Office robbery ==
The gang's last robbery was on November 3, 1988, at 5:13. They robbed a postal transport of money and valuables as it arrived at the old central postal office, carrying DKK 9.3 million (US$1.4 million) in cash and bearer bonds plus about DKK 5 million in other valuables. As the gang left with their takings, the police arrived earlier than anticipated. In the ensuing shootout, a rookie police officer was killed by buckshot from the sawed-off shotgun used during the robbery, which facilitated an exchange of information between the secret police and the robbery squad.

On November 2, 1988, at 22:00, gang members Torkil Lauesen, Weimann, Jørgensen, Carsten Nielsen, and Marc Rudin met at the hideout in Blekingegade. At night, postal trains picked up the day's mail and dropped them off at the designated post offices. The gang stole four or five cars and parked them at strategic locations. An orange Toyota HiAce van was parked in Løvstræde across from the back gate of the post office.

On November 3, 1988, at 04:25, postal trains delivered mail at the postal rail terminal between Copenhagen central station and Copenhagen police headquarters. At 04:50, money and other high-value mail was loaded from the trains to a yellow armored postal van, call sign 8886 K5B, with the driver "JF" and the guard "FA". The van had a direct radio link to police HQ, but the gang thought the radio link was to the postal HQ who would then have to phone the police before they could respond to any robbery. At 05:00, the van left the postal terminal bound for the old main post office in Købmagergade, hence code K5. At around 05:02, it passed and greeted the alfa-south police patrol car near Tivoli.

At around 05:03, the van passed town hall square, where Nielsen spotted it and signaled the rest of the gang by radio. He then jumped on a bicycle and pedaled to the van. At the same time, the gang put a blue "police" light on the stolen Ford Escort and drove to the post office. Rudin and "member Y" were disguised as uniformed policemen, while Lauesen and "member X" were disguised as detectives. X and Y are Jørgensen and Weimann, but only the gang knew their identities. At around 05:06, the fake detectives and policemen arrived at the post office back gate in Løvstræde. The fake detectives questioned the gatekeeper about perpetrators of a made-up nearby assault, while the fake policemen pretended to search the yard.

At the same time, the van slowed down to a crawl as it turned down Niels Hemmingsens Gade. An early plan was to use a fake bicycle accident to attack the van, but it was abandoned for being too risky. At 05:07, the van drove into the yard behind the old post office. The gatekeeper closed the gate, and JF reported safe arrival to the radio dispatcher. At around 05:07, FA got out of the van and rang the bell for the postal workers to pick up the cargo. At around 05:10, FA and two postal workers unloaded the mail to a cage on wheels on the loading ramp.

At 05:13, the fake uniformed policemen broke their cover and attacked FA on the ramp. JF called in the robbery to the radio dispatcher. The gang estimated a police response time of two minutes from this point. At 05:14:00, the police dispatcher sent out the alarm requesting that any patrols in the area respond to the robbery. At 05:14, patrol car 0–11 with officer KB and his new rookie partner Jesper Egtved Hansen passed the Church of the Holy Ghost. Alfa-south and 0-11 responded to the alarm call and both drove towards the post office. At the same time, one fake policeman pushed over the cage with a loud bang. JF reported this bang as a gunshot to the radio dispatcher, which led the police to believe the gang had started shooting. Lauesen and X knocked down the gatekeeper. Lauesen opened the gate and Nielsen backed the van into the yard. X did crowd control with the sawed-off shotgun, while the other fake policeman stopped FA at gunpoint. The fake policemen loaded the loot into the orange van, and Lauesen joined them.

=== Escape and the killing ===
At 05:15:19, the gang finished loading the goods into the van and jumped in the back. X jumped into the front seat and they drove out the gate with 21 seconds to spare according to their countdown watch, but alfa-south had already reached Løvstræde and 0-11 was getting in position around the corner to the left. At 05:15, one of the policemen from alfa-south fired twice at the van. One bullet hit a storefront, while the other bullet went through the back window, barely missing the gang members in the back, ricocheted off the side and lodged itself into the drivers seat cushion about an inch from Nielsen's back. The van turned sharp right down Købmagergade and stopped abruptly. X jumped out and fired the shotgun in the general direction of 0–11.

A buckshot pellet hit officer Hansen in the head, killing him. There are three interpretations of this event:

- In court, the police argued that the shot was aimed at Hansen and the killing was intentional.
- Peter Øvig Knudsen claimed that the plan was to damage the pursuing patrol car (alfa-south) to allow the gang to escape, and the buckshot round was chosen for its ability to destroy a car tire at a distance of 5 to 15 meters.
- In their 2009 response, the gang claimed the shot was a warning shot aimed over the policemen's heads but a stray bullet hit Hansen as he stood up on high ground to aim his gun at the gang. Øvig mentioned the use of a warning shot as an alternate use of the shotgun if the distance was more than 15 meters.

At 05:15, the van turned left down Klareboderne and escaped. At 05:15:50, officer KB reported an officer down to the dispatcher. At around 05:17, the van drove into an underground carpark in Klerkegade, where the gang switched to two other getaway cars with the stolen goods. At 05:20, the head of the police robbery squad received the call from the dispatcher. At 07:00, the operations chief of police intelligence Per Larsen heard of the robbery and immediately suspected the gang. At 08:15, the gang met up in Blekingegade with the goods, dispersed and resumed their normal daily duties to avoid suspicion. At 08:57, police intelligence units began 24/7 surveillance of the known gang members, which continued until their arrest.

== 1989 to 1995 ==
On April 13, 1989, the police arrested Peter Døllner, Torkil Lauesen, Jan Weimann, Niels Jørgensen and Niels Jørgensen's ex-wife. However, a search of their homes and workplaces did not provide any useful evidence except for some identical sets of keys. The police realised the keys were for the gang's secret hideout, but did not know the address. Between April 13 and May 2, 1989, Carsten Nielsen became scared and slightly paranoid due to the arrests, realizing he was next. However he managed to remove or destroy some of the evidence from the hideout in Blekinge Street, while staying with friends and family, constantly on the move.

On May 2, 1989, Carsten Nielsen accidentally drove his car, which was rented in his brother's name, into a lamppost. He was disfigured and blinded by the crash and was picked up by traffic police, who sent him to hospital and searched the car. Amongst the items in the car was a utility bill for the hideout in Blekinge Street. Carsten Nielsen was arrested in his hospital bed. Later that day, the police searched the hideout in Blekinge Street and discovered plenty of evidence awaiting destruction as well as a massive cache of weaponry not yet shipped to the PFLP. The sensational find of so much weaponry in a residential building prompted the press to give the gang its nickname "The Blekinge Street Gang".

The trial lasted from September 3, 1990, to May 2, 1991, before a verdict was reached. Due to the statute of limitations, all crimes before ca. 1980 and some later crimes were not included in the charges. Due to the inability to prove which gang member pulled the trigger or at least proving that the gang had planned to use deadly force, no person was convicted for the death of the young police officer, and this part of the case remained open. Some of the specific charges resulted in "not guilty" verdicts. On November 8, 1991, the sentences were confirmed by the supreme court on appeal. Marc Rudin was separately convicted for his role in the last robbery in October 1993. On December 13, 1995, the remaining gang members still in prison were released on parole (good behavior + 2/3 of the sentence served). Marc Rudin was released from prison in February 1997.
