= AASU =

AASU and Aasu may refer to:

- All-Africa Students Union, a pan-African student union
- All Assam Students Union, a students' organization in Assam, India
- Armstrong State University, a state university located in Savannah, Georgia formerly known as Armstrong Atlantic State University
- Aasu, American Samoa, village on Tutuila Island, American Samoa
- Aasu, Estonia, village in Haljala Parish, Lääne-Viru County, Estonia
