= Party of Labour of Austria =

Party of Labour of Austria Partei der Arbeit Österreichs
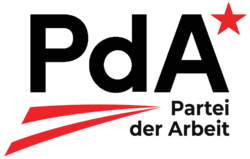
- Chairperson: Otto Bruckner
- Founded: October 12, 2013
- Split from: Communist Party of Austria
- Preceded by: Communist Initiative
- Headquarters: Drorygasse 21, Vienna
- Newspaper: Zeitung der Arbeit
- Youth wing: Jugendfront (Youth Front)
- Ideology: Communism; Marxism-Leninism; Hard Euroscepticism
- Political position: Far-left
- European affiliation: INITIATIVE (2013–2023); ECA (2023–)
- International affiliation: IMCWP
- Colours: Red

Website
- http://www.parteiderarbeit.at/

The Party of Labour of Austria (German: Partei der Arbeit Österreichs, PdA) is a Marxist-Leninist party party in Austria. PdA was founded on 12 October 2013 by the Communist Initiative, a Marxist-Leninist breakaway faction of the Communist Party of Austria (KPÖ), who were dissatisfied with the party's ideological orientation.

== History ==
Communist Initiative was an internal group in the Communist Party of Austria, founded in 2004 to promote Marxist–Leninist ideas in the party. The Initiative broke with the KPÖ in 2005, citing a lack of internal democracy.

PdA's founding conference was attended by delegates from the Communist Party of Greece (KKE), Hungarian Workers' Party (Munkáspárt), German Communist Party (DKP), Communist Party of the Workers of Spain (PCTE), and Communist Party of Turkey (TKP). The party has particularly close fraternal relations with the KKE. The founding conference was also attended by Yahima Martínez, the ambassador to Austria from Cuba.

Chairman Tibor Zenker unexpectedly died at the age of 50 on April 16, 2026, and Otto Bruckner took over as party chairman on April 19.

== Elections ==
The PdA contested the elections for the Vienna City Council in 2015 in six different districts, namely Leopoldstadt, Favoriten, Simmering, Meidling, Ottakring, and Donaustadt. The PdA gained 441 votes (between 0,1 % and 0,18 %), insufficient to gain a seat in any of the district councils. In 2020, the PdA only contested the Ottakring district, gaining 79 votes (0,21%).

== Party chairpersons ==
Name	Period	Notes
Otto Bruckner	2013–2019	
Tibor Zenker	2019–2026	Died on April 16, 2026.
Otto Bruckner	2026-	
