= IGD =

IGD may stand for:

- Internet Gateway Device Protocol as defined in UPnP
- İlerici Gençler Derneği, Progressive Young Association of Turkey
- Immunoglobulin D, an antibody protein involved in the maturation of B cells
- Integrated Graphics Device, a graphics processing unit integrated directly into the motherboard of a PC
- Islamic Community of Germany, a religious organization in Germany
- It's Going Down (website), a media collective publishing from an anarchist perspective
