= FJR =

FJR may refer to:

- Father John Redmond Catholic Secondary School and Regional Arts Centre, in Toronto, Ontario, Canada
- Formula Junior, a racing class
- Frederick James Rowe (c.1844 – 5 January 1909), a professor of English literature
- Frente Juvenil Revolucionario, the youth wing of the Mexican Institutional Revolutionary Party
- Fujairah International Airport, in the United Arab Emirates

== See also ==
- FJ (disambiguation)
