= DKU =

DKU may refer to:

- Communist Youth of Denmark, also known as Danmarks Kommunistiske Ungdom, a defunct Danish Communist youth organisation
- Dankook University, a private research university in Yongin and Cheonan, South Korea
- Duke Kunshan University, a Chinese-American partnership of Duke University and Wuhan University in Kunshan, Jiangsu, China
