= Tibor Szanyi =

Hungarian politician

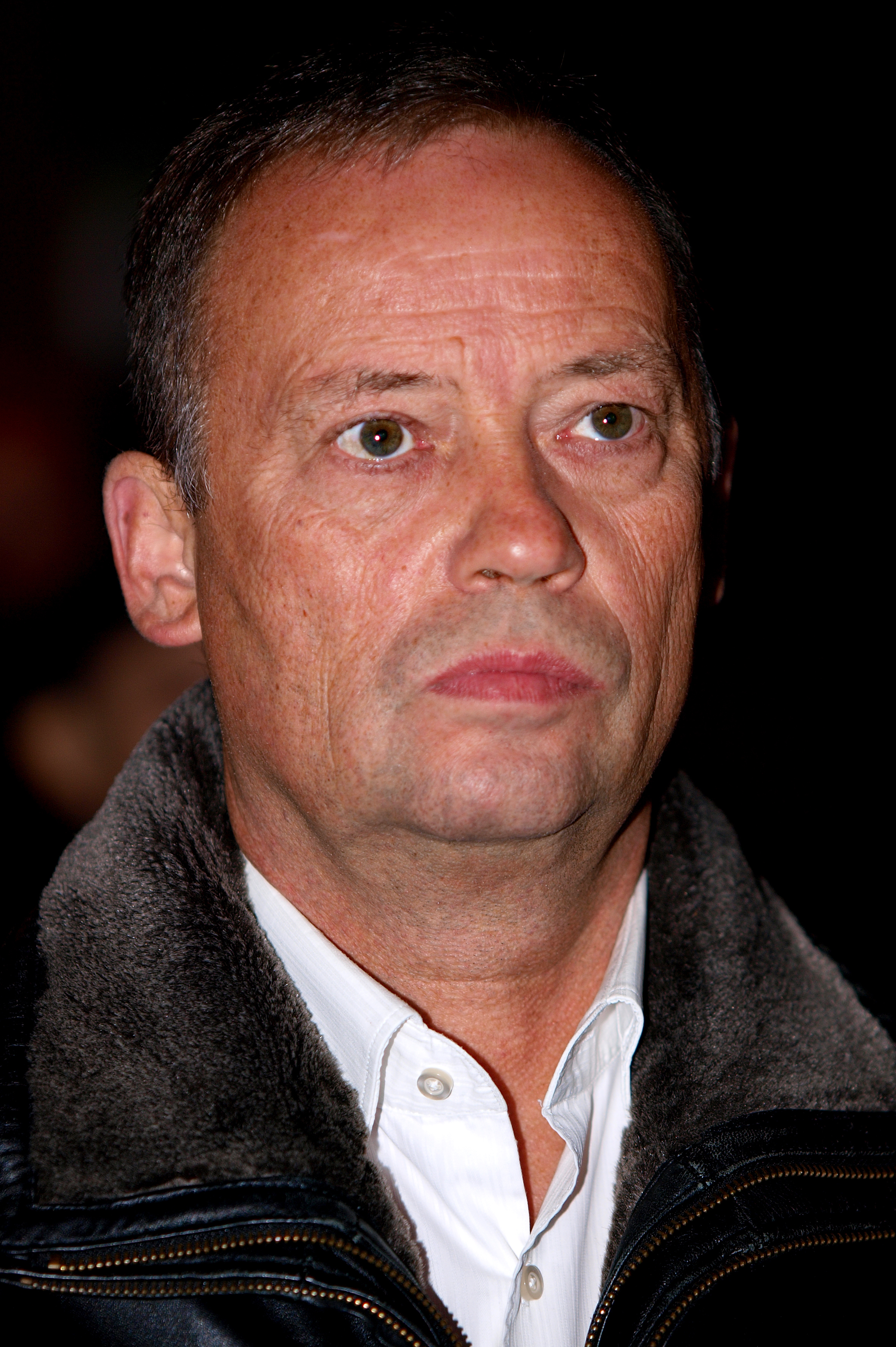

Member of the European Parliament
- In office 2 July 2014 – 2 July 2019
- Succeeded by: Katalin Cseh
- Constituency: Hungary

Personal details
- Born: 13 July 1956 (age 70) Budapest, Hungary
- Party: Hungarian Socialist Party (1998-2019); Yes Solidarity for Hungary Movement (2020-present)
- Profession: politician

Tibor Szanyi (born 13 July 1956) is a Hungarian politician. He is a former member of the Hungarian Socialist Party who was Member of the European Parliament from 2014 to 2019 and member of the National Assembly from 1998 to 2014. He was also deputy president of the party between 2018 and 2019. Since March 2020, he is a founding member of the Yes Solidarity for Hungary Movement which supported him as candidate for prime minister in the 2022 election.
