= Yes Solidarity for Hungary Movement =

Political party in Hungary

Yes Solidarity for Hungary Movement Igen Szolidaritás Magyarországért Mozgalom
- Abbreviation: ISZOMM
- President: Andrea Huszti
- Chairperson: Tibor Szanyi; Sándor Székely; Szilvia Szabóné Kállai; Péter Tóth
- Founded: 6 March 2020
- Registered: 14 June 2020
- Newspaper: Szócikk
- Ideology: Democratic socialism Green politics Eco-socialism; Anti-capitalism; Kádárism
- Political position: Left-wing to far-left
- National affiliation: Leftist Alliance
- European affiliation: Party of the European Left (partner)
- Colors: Red
- Slogan: Veled Vagyunk! (We are with you!)
- National Assembly: 0 / 199
- European Parliament: 0 / 21
- County Assemblies: 0 / 381

Website
- igenszolidaritas.hu

The Yes Solidarity for Hungary Movement (Hungarian: Igen Szolidaritás Magyarországért Mozgalom, pronounced [ˈiɡɛn ˈsolidɒritaːʃ ˈmɒɟɒrorsaːɡeːrt ˈmozɡɒlom], ISZOMM) is a democratic socialist political party in Hungary that was founded by Tibor Szanyi in 2020.

== History ==
ISZOMM was founded by a group of several left-wing politicians, such as Tibor Szanyi, a former MP and MEP of the MSZP, Szilárd Kalmár, the former leader of the Radical Left Party, and Andrea Huszti, one of the founders of the Together 2014 coalition. The party presented itself at a press conference on March 6, 2020, in Budapest, and the founders have stated that they intend to run in the 2021 opposition primary before the parliamentary election, and then compete in the 2022 parliamentary election, with plans to nominate individual candidates in 106 constituencies and to participate in a united opposition coalition against Fidesz and Viktor Orbán.

Eventually they stood 49 candidates together with Munkaspart. Before the 2022 election, ISZOMM had one seat in the National Assembly: their first MP was Sándor Székely, who had defected from the DK to join the ISZOMM in 2020.

== Election results ==
=== National Assembly ===
Election	Leader	Constituency		Party list		Seats	+/–	Status
Election	Leader	Votes	%	Votes	%	Seats	+/–	Status
2022 (Note: Ran within the Leftist Alliance (ISZOMM-MMP).)	Tibor Szanyi	8,678	0.16% (#7)	—N/a		0 / 199	New	Extra-parliamentary
