= Communist Revolutionary Party of France =

French political party

Communist Revolutionary Party of France Parti Communiste Révolutionnaire de France
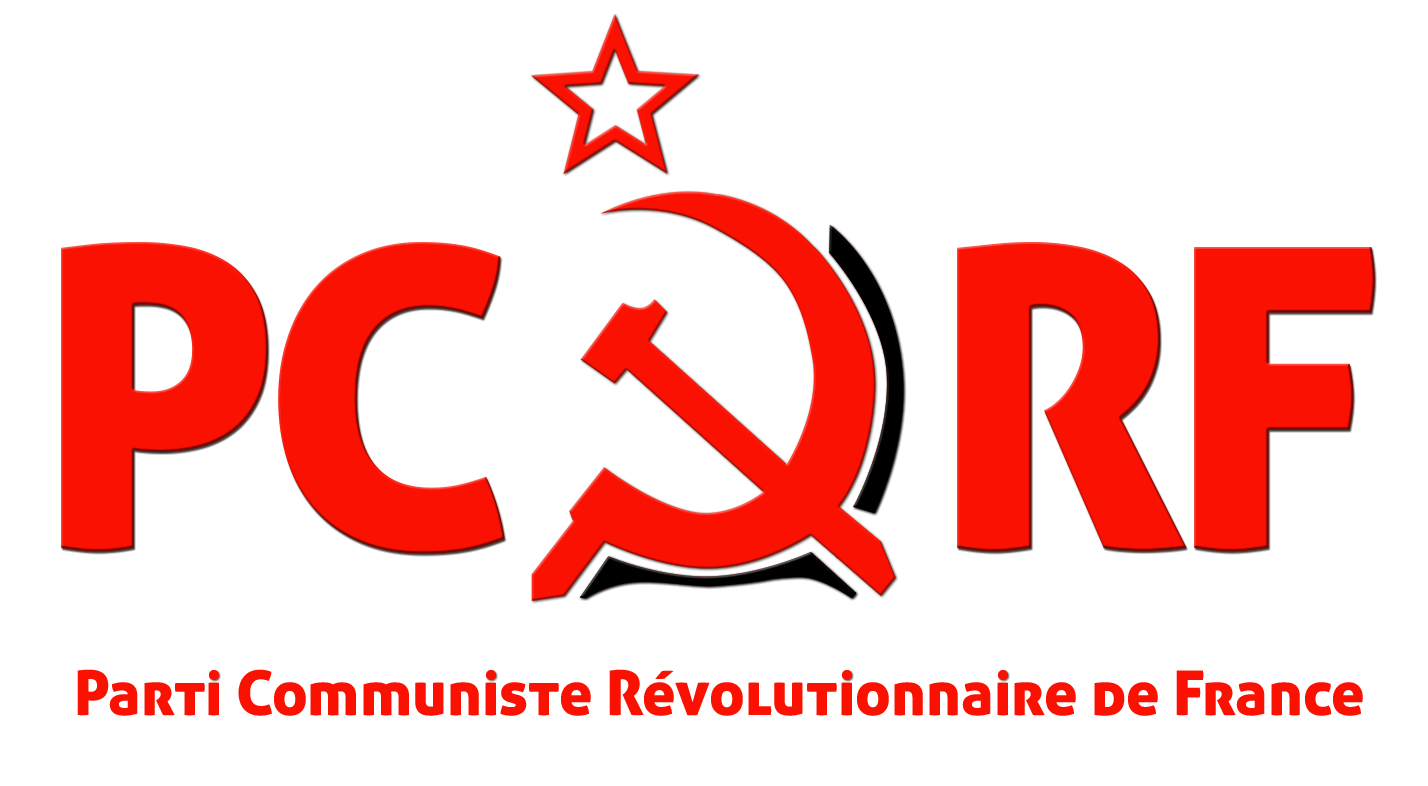
- General Secretary: Pierre Komorov
- Founded: 23 October 2016
- Merger of: Intervention Communiste and the Union Révolutionaire Communistes de France
- Headquarters: Paris
- Newspaper: Intervention Communiste
- Youth wing: Union of the Communist Youth
- Ideology: Communism; Marxism-Leninism; Anti-revisionism; Hard Euroscepticism
- Political position: Far-left
- European affiliation: INITIATIVE (2013–2023); ECA (2023–)
- European Parliament group: Non-Inscrits
- Colours: Red
- National Assembly: 0 / 577
- Senate: 0 / 348
- European Parliament: 0 / 74

Party flag
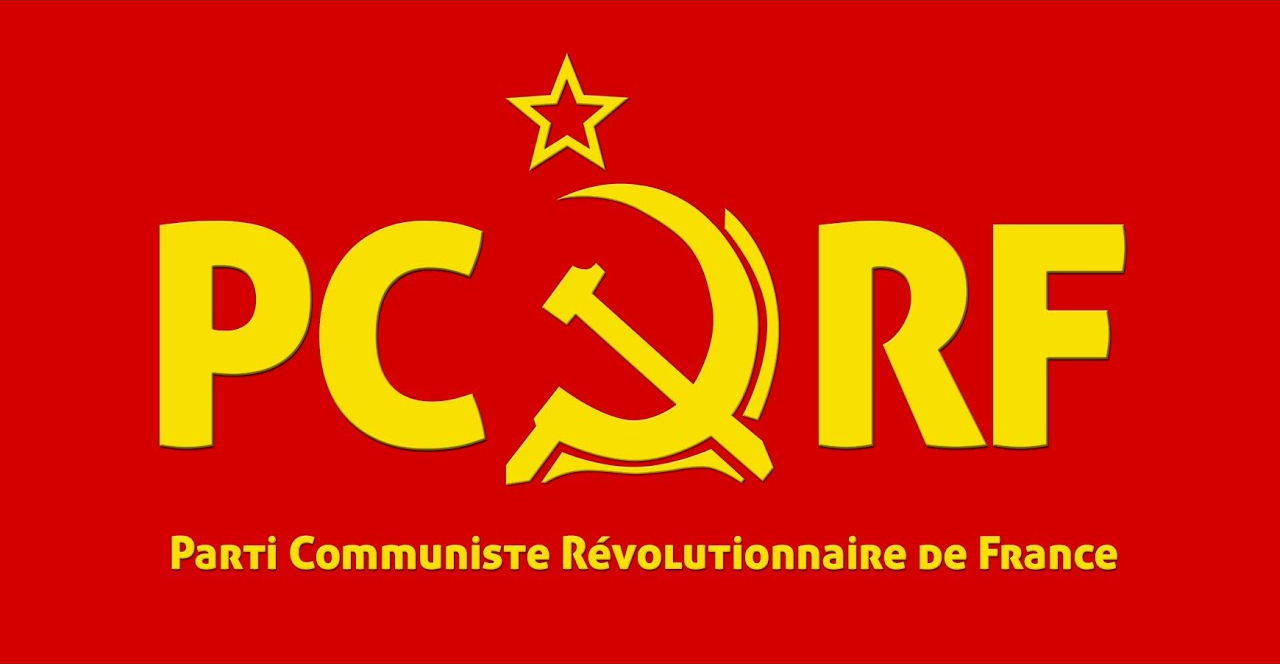

Website
- pcrf-ic.fr

The Communist Revolutionary Party of France (French: Parti communiste révolutionnaire de France, abbreviated PCRF) is an anti-revisionist Marxist-Leninist party founded in 2016. It was the result of a merger of Intervention Communiste and the Union Révolutionaire Communistes de France (URCF).

== History ==
Initially in 1991, the Coordination Communiste pour la Continuité Révolutionnaire et la Renaissance Léniniste du PCF (CC) was established as an internal faction of the Parti Communiste Français (PCF) by the party's orthodox Marxists-Leninists members. In 1994, its press organ named Intervention Communiste (IC) was launched. At the faction's 4th national conference, a minority group led by Georges Gastaud split and established the Coordination des Militants Communistes du PCF pour sa Continuité Révolutionnaire et sa Renaissance Léniniste (CMC) staying in the PCF, which would eventually become the Pôle de renaissance communiste en France (PRCF).

The majority left the PCF and established the Coordination Communiste pour la Reconstruction d'un Parti Communiste Révolutionnaire (CC) led by Jean-Luc Sallé and Maurice Cukierman, which would eventually form the Union Révolutionaire Communistes de France in 2004.

Maurice Cukierman died on 24 July 2020. On 29 August the central committee unanimously elected Pierre Komorov (PK) as the new secretary-general, and Emmanuelle Kraemer as deputy secretary-general.

== Ideology ==
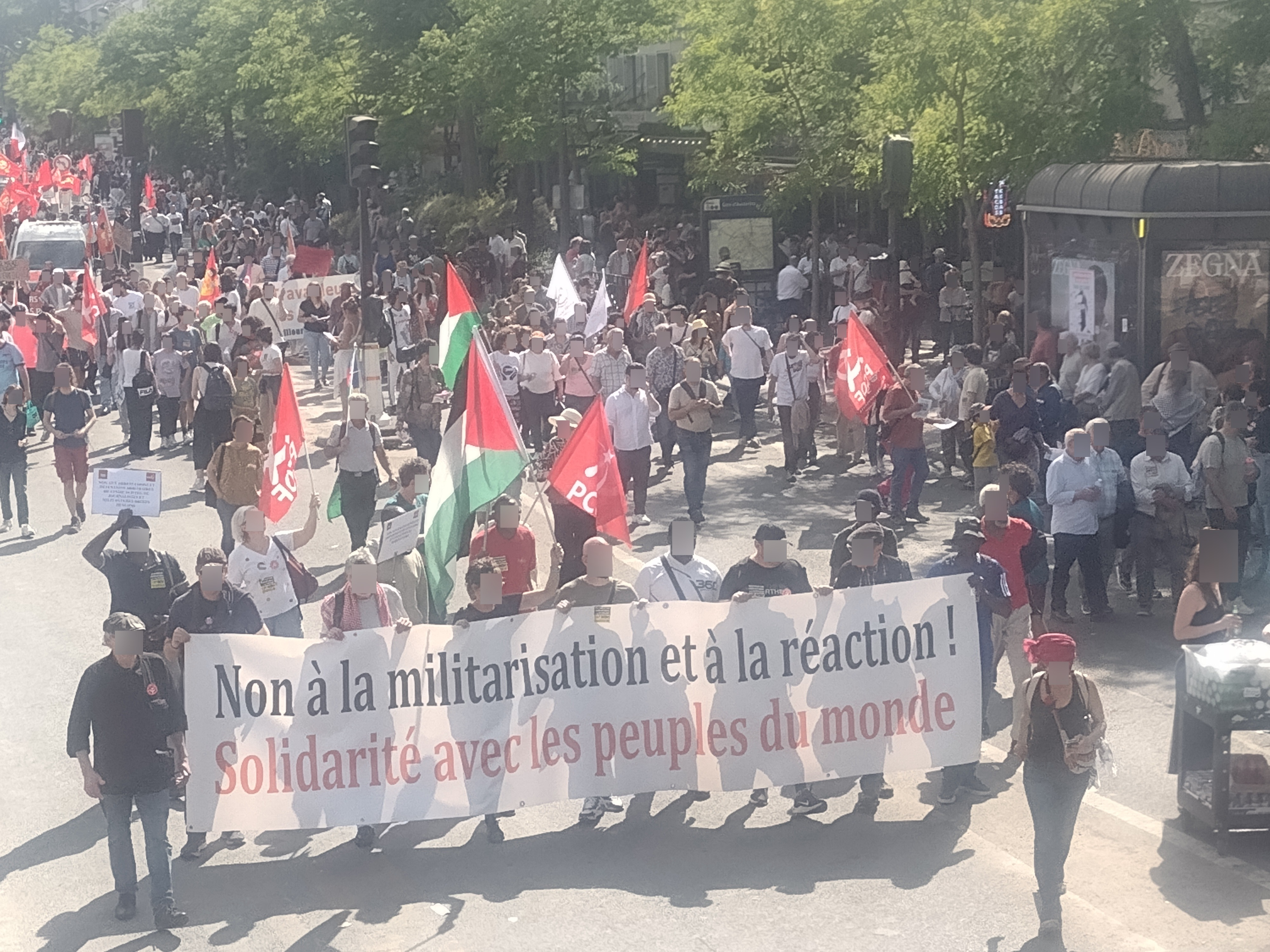
Communist Revolutionary Party of France during the International Workers' Day, 2025

The PCRF is an anti-revisionist communist party and upholds the legacy of the Soviet Union as a socialist country until the Perestroika period during Mikhail Gorbachev’s leadership. It considers the policy initiated by Nikita Khrushchev’s leadership as degenerative and a step back from a socialist system to a capitalist one, a process which continued until Mikhail Gorbachev’s leadership, during which the capitalist regime was restored after the 1985-1991 counter-revolution. The PCRF recognizes the states of Cuba and the DPRK as the only examples of countries that build socialism at the moment, however, the party is not supportive of China, which it views as an emerging imperialist power. The PCRF supports self-determination of Kanaky and Corsica.

== Election results ==
The PCRF participated in the 2017 election for the National Assembly, fielding candidates in two constituencies.

Constituency	Candidate	Votes	%
Aude's 3rd	Michel Martin	144	0,30%
Hauts-de-Seine's 13th	Maurice Cukierman	115	0,22%

In 2022 the party fielded candidates in four constituencies:

Constituency	Candidate	Votes	%
Aude's 3rd	Michel Martin	131	0,27%
Eure-et-Loir 2nd	Emmanuelle Kraemer	34	0,11%
Ille-et-Vilaine 4th	Christian Lohyn	156	0,33%
Seine-Saint-Denis 2nd	Jean-Christophe Brossard	151	0,86%

== See also ==
- French Communist Party
- Communist Revolutionary Party (France)
- Pole of Communist Revival in France
- Workers' Communist Party of France
- List of anti-revisionist groups
