= Union of Czech Youth =

Czech Youth Union Svaz české mládeže
- Founded: 4 June 1945
- Dissolved: 23 April 1949
- Merged into: Czechoslovak Youth Union
- Headquarters: Prague, Czechoslovakia
- Ideology: Socialism
- Mother party: Communist Party of Czechoslovakia; Czechoslovak Social Democracy (4 June 1945 – 27 June 1948); Czechoslovak National Socialist Party (4 June 1945 – 8 May 1946)
- National affiliation: National Front
- International affiliation: World Federation of Democratic Youth
- Newspaper: Mladá fronta

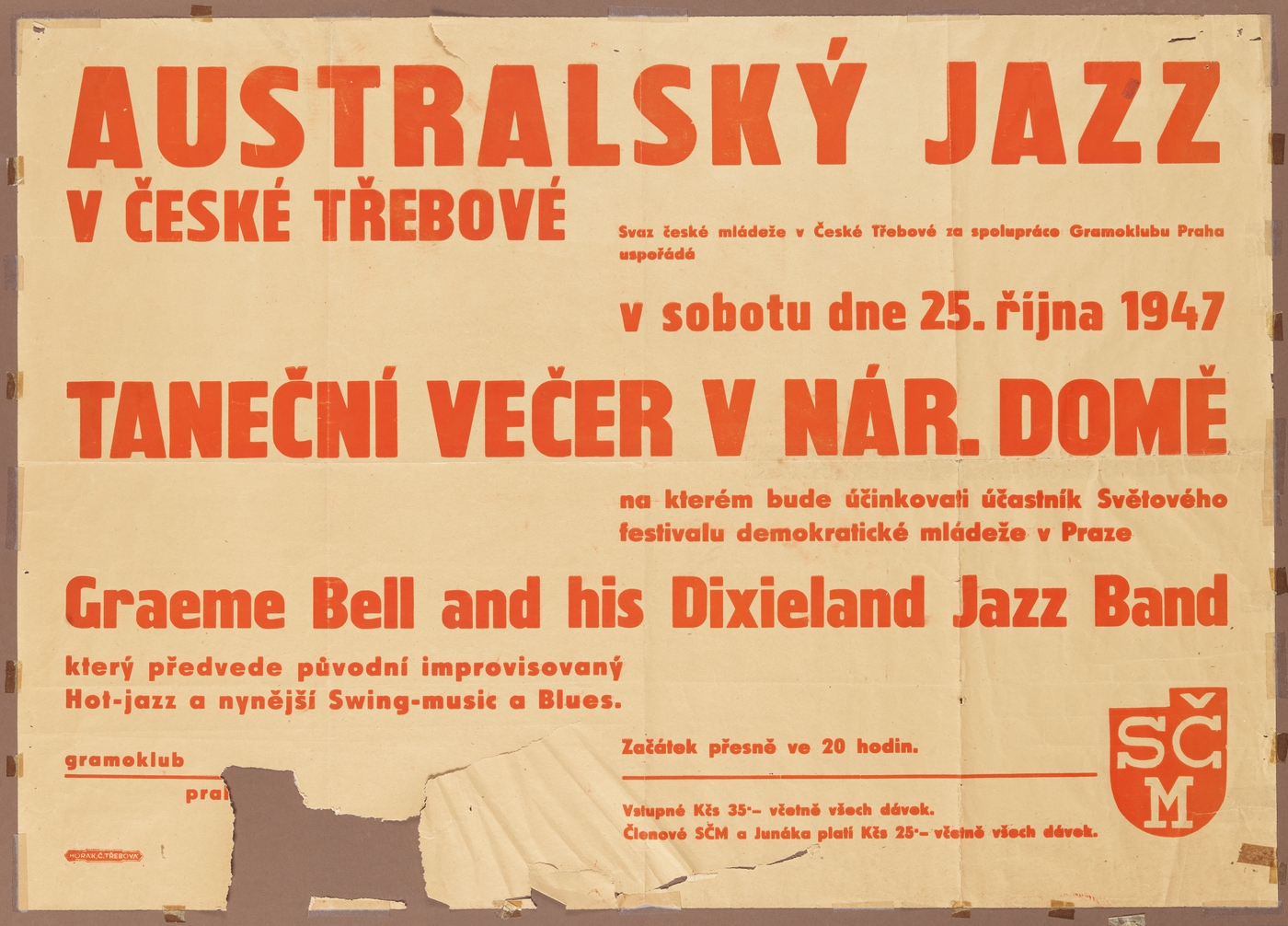
SČM poster, announcing a Graeme Bell concert.

The Union of Czech Youth (Czech: Svaz české mládeže, abbreviated SČM) was a youth organization in post-war Czechoslovakia. The organization was founded on Radhošť in July 1945. Originally it functioned as a unified left-wing youth organization, over time the Communist Party of Czechoslovakia gained more influence. SČM had two deputies in the Provisional National Assembly, Hájek and Maleček. As of 1946 SČM claimed to have 7,200 local branches and around half a million members. Membership in the organization declined during 1946 and 1947. The organization published the daily newspaper Mladá fronta. SČM was part of the National Front.

== Dissolution ==
After 1948 Czechoslovak coup d'état, the communists planned to merge all youth groups fully under one organization. On 23 April 1949 Czech Youth Union merged with its Slovak counterpart, the Union of Slovak Youth, and formed the Czechoslovak Youth Union, organization under direct control of the Communist Party of Czechoslovakia.
