= Gyula Thürmer =

Hungarian politician (born 1953)

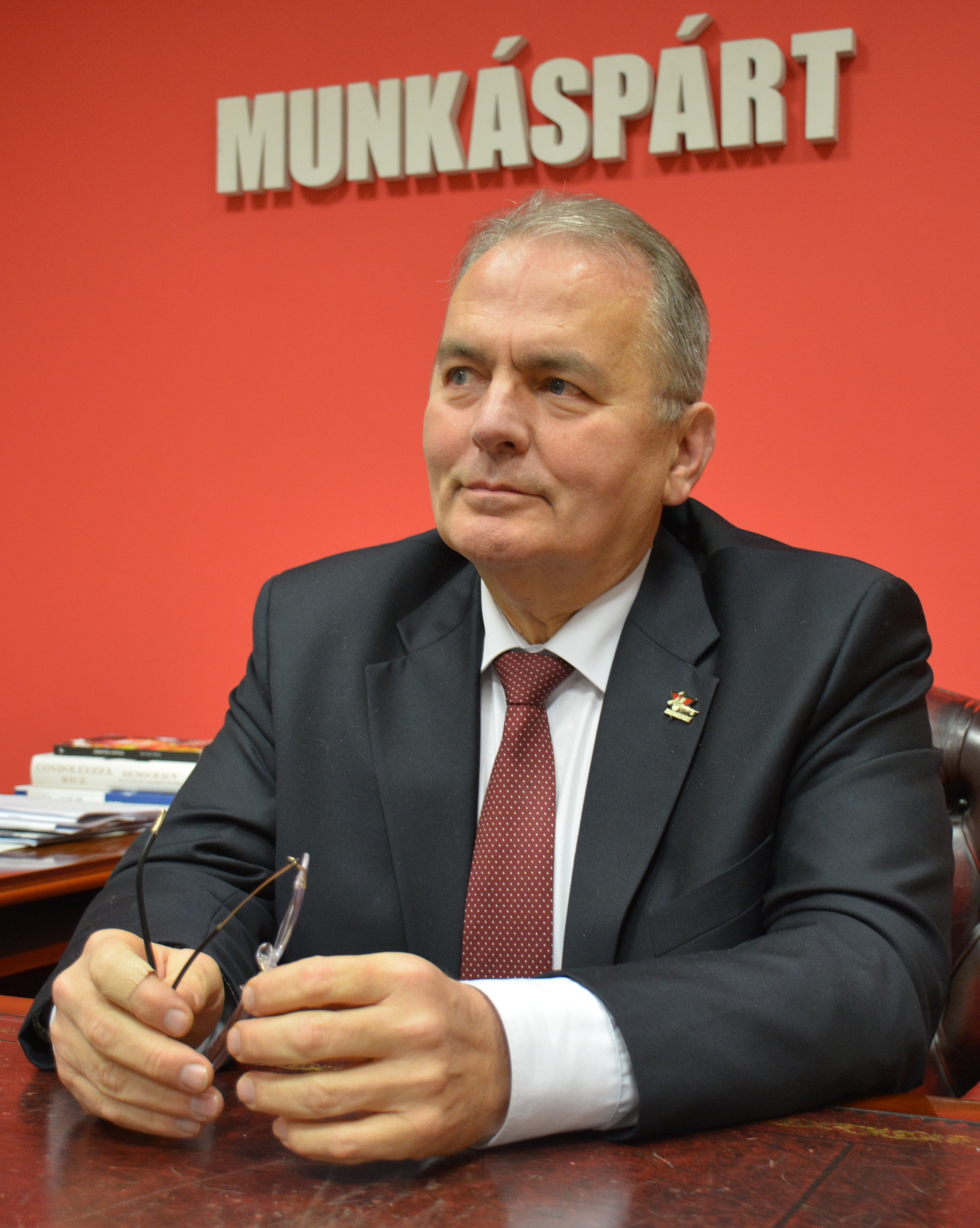
- Thürmer in 2018

Chairman of the Hungarian Workers' Party
- Incumbent
- Assumed office 17 December 1989
- Preceded by: New party

Personal details
- Born: 14 April 1953 (age 73) Budapest, Hungary
- Party: Hungarian Workers' Party
- Other political affiliations: MSZMP (1971-1989)
- Children: Máté Gyula; Marianna
- Occupation: Politician
- Profession: Diplomat, politician

Gyula Thürmer (born 14 April 1953) is a Hungarian communist politician and a former diplomat, who has been the chairman of the Hungarian Workers' Party since its formation on 17 December 1989.

== Works ==
- Nem kell NATO! (1995), Progressio Kft.
- Balszemmel (book series, 2006–), Progressio Kft.
- Az elsikkasztott ország (2009), Korona Kiadó
- 25 év árral szemben (2014), Progressio Kft.
