= Baloldali Front =

Hungarian youth political organization

Left Front – Communist Youth Alliance Kommunista Ifjúsági Szövetség
- President: Directorate
- Founded: 14 March 1999
- Preceded by: MI(SZ)
- Headquarters: H-1082 Budapest, District VIII., Baross Street 61.
- Ideology: Communism; Marxism–Leninism; Kádárism
- Mother party: Hungarian Workers' Party
- International affiliation: WFDY
- Website: www.baloldalifront.hu (defunct)

The Left Front – Communist Youth Alliance (Baloldali Front - Kommunista Ifjúsági Szövetség in Hungarian) is the inactive youth organization of the Hungarian Workers' Party, founded in 1999, as the successor of the Marxist Youth Alliance (MI(SZ)). Its first name was Left Front - Workers Youth Alliance (Baloldali Front - Munkás Ifjúsági Szövetség). The Baloldali Front joined the World Federation of Democratic Youth in 2004.

The Front is inactive as indicated by the following pieces of evidence. First, its website is no longer operational since 2017. Second, no operating Facebook page or other social media activity can be detected. Third, the Front is no longer listed on the website of Munkáspárt as an organization related to the party.

== History ==
Founded on 14 March 1999, "Baloldali Front" was the first real communist youth movement since the cessation of the Hungarian Young Communist League (KISZ) in 1989. The founders wanted to re-establish that, so they transformed the youth department of the Workers' Party (Munkáspárt) into a new organization. The Front's first logo was a red tomato, which was later replaced by a claret-black coloured star.

Péter Székely was elected as president in 2004. At the same time, the movement started to use the name "Communist Youth Alliance". With the leadership of Péter Székely, Baloldali Front was an important ally of the international movements. The solidarity with Latin America was significant. As Székely reached the 35 years age limit, he was replaced by Kinga Kalocsai. She continued his predecessor's politics: the Front demonstrated against the prohibition of KSM, the youth section of Communist Party of Bohemia and Moravia, and declared solidarity with Palestine. In 2006, the crisis in the "Munkáspárt" reached the youth movement too - some members quit. The re-organisation was crucial.

In 2008, a new president, Tamás Szabó was elected. From then they focused on the political crisis of Hungary, not the international politics. Many Front members were candidates under the name of "Magyar Kommunista Munkáspárt" in the European Parliament election in 2009. The Front had a new logo, but because it looked like a deformed red star, which was restricted in Hungary, it was soon replaced by the modernised version of the former logo.

In 2011, the presidency of the Front was dissolved, and they founded a new organisation, called "Radikál-Humanista Mozgalom" (Radical-Humanist Movement).

== Objectives ==
The Front supported peace, opposed Hungary's NATO-membership, and the politics of the European Union. They demanded the right to work, housing, and free clinics as fundamental rights. They wanted free, easily accessible education for everyone, and fought for the rights of students.

== Basic information ==
It was free to join Baloldali Front for every Hungarian citizen between the age 14 and 35. (Between 35 and 45 they could be supporter members.) The Front's basic units worked at the local level. The central body of the Front was the National Bureau, led by the president.

== Presidents ==
- Péter Székely (1999–2005)
- Kinga Kalocsai (2005–2008)
- Tamás Szabó (2008–2010)
- Miklós Cseh (2010–2011)
- Judit Nagy (2011–2012)
- Marianna Thürmer (2012- )
- Gábor Pető (2012- )
- Kristóf Turi (2012- )

From 2012 a three-member management team headed the organization until its activity ceased.
