= Front of Communist Youth =

Italian Marxist–Leninist youth organization

Front of Communist Youth Fronte della Gioventù Comunista
- Secretary General: Lorenzo Lang
- Founded: 10 June 2012
- Membership: 1,500 (2020)
- Ideology: Communism; Marxism–Leninism; Anti-revisionism; Anti-imperialism; Anti-fascism; Hard Euroscepticism
- Colours: Red
- Mother party: Communist Front (since 2021); Before: Communist Party (2016-2020)
- International affiliation: World Federation of Democratic Youth (WFDY)
- European affiliation: Meeting of European Communist Youth Organizations (MECYO)
- Newspaper: L'Ordine Nuovo
- Magazine: Senza Tregua
- Website: gioventucomunista.it

The Front of Communist Youth (Italian: Fronte della Gioventù Comunista, FGC) is a Marxist–Leninist youth organization founded in 2012. It defines itself as "a revolutionary organization of young workers, students, and workless youth that struggles against capitalism, to build a socialist society". The FGC consisted of around 1,500 members as of 2020 and participates in student elections and political actions across Italy.

The FGC assumes a revolutionary program and bases its ideology on Marxism–Leninism. It aims to abolish capitalism and to transform Italy into a socialist state. It draws inspiration from real socialism, particularly the Soviet Union before Khrushchev. The FGC also claims the necessity for Italy of a unilateral exit from EU and NATO.

The FGC is a stable member of the World Federation of Democratic Youth (WFDY) and of the Meeting of European Communist Youth Organisations (MECYO).

== History ==
The Fronte of Communist Youth was founded at the end of a process of unification promoted by the Roman political group Senza Tregua, which involved other groups, associations and individual activists linked to the communist movement, culminating in a constituent assembly held on 9 and 10 June 2012 in Rome.

In March of the following year, the organisation's first national congress was held, where national coordinator Alessandro Mustillo was elected secretary. In 2015, the FGC became a member of the World Federation of Democratic Youth and in 2016 and 2024 hosted the twelfth and the eighteenth Meeting of European Communist Youth Organisations (MECYO) in Rome.

On 12 March 2020, the Front of Communist Youth split from Italy's Communist Party, of which it had been affiliated since 2016. The FGC accused Marco Rizzo, the Party's General Secretary, of "individualism" and "opportunism", and left due to organizational and political differences. The Front of Communist Youth joined the Communist Front (Italy) in 2021 after splitting from the Communist Party in 2020.

== Congresses ==
| Number | Year | Location | Motto |
|---|---|---|---|
| 1. | 8–10 March 2013 | Rome | "Communism is the youth of the world" |
| 2. | 9–11 December 2016 | Rome | "Organize the struggles, strengthen the Youth for Communist Reconstruction." |
| 3. | 9–12 June 2022 | Rome | "Vanguard in the real movement, basis for communist reconstruction" |
