= Torkil Lauesen =

Danish communist writer (born 1952)

Torkil Lauesen (born 1952, Korsør) is a Danish communist writer. From 1971 to 1989, he was a member of the Kommunistisk Arbejdskreds and later a co-founder of the Manifest-Kommunistisk Arbejdsgruppe (referred to in the press as the Blekingegade Gang) in Copenhagen, supporting anti-imperialist struggle in the Third World, especially in Palestine, by legal and illegal means. In connection with his anti-imperialist work, he has traveled to Lebanon, Syria, Zimbabwe, South Africa, the Philippines, and Mexico. He is currently a member of the Internationalt Forum and is a board member of the Arghiri Emmanuel Association.

After the Blekingegade Gang's robbery of Købmagergade Post Office on 3 November 1988 that resulted in the death of policeman Jesper Egtved Hansen, Lauesen was arrested on 13 April 1989 and sentenced to ten years in prison on 2 May 1991. He served his prison sentence in Vridsløselille Prison until he was released on parole on 13 December 1995. While in prison, he began studying political science as a self-study master's student at the University of Copenhagen, obtaining his degree in June 1997.

Jesper Langebæk hired him to work as a district councilor in Copenhagen Municipality in 2000, where he worked for several years.

== Publications ==
- Lauesen, Torkil (1998). Fra forbedringshus til parkeringshus: magt og modmagt i Vridsløselille Statsfængsel. København: Hans Reitzels Forlag A/S. ISBN 9788741227900
- Lauesen, Torkil (1991). Nord-Syd konflikten i 90'erne. København: Fangegruppen, Ungdomshuset.
- Lauesen, Torkil (1994). Det globale oprør: folkemagt og basisdemokrati mod markedskræfter og statsmagt. København: Autonomt Forlag. ISBN 9788798502722
- Lauesen, Torkil. (2016). Det globale perspektiv. København: Nemo. ISBN 9788792880086
- Lauesen, Torkil (2018), trans. Kuhn, Gabriel. The Global Perspective: Reflections on Imperialism and Resistance. Montreal: Kersplebedeb Publishing. ISBN 9781894946933
- Lauesen, Torkil (2020), trans. Kuhn, Gabriel. The Principal Contradiction. Montreal: Kersplebedeb Publishing. ISBN 9781989701034
- Lauesen, Torkil (2021). Riding the Wave: Sweden's Integration into the Imperialist World System. Montreal: Kersplebedeb Publishing. ISBN 9781989701126
- Lauesen, Torkil (2024). The Long Transition Towards Socialism and the End of Capitalism. Iskra Books. ISBN 9798330404315
- Lauesen, Torkil (2025). Unequal Exchange: Past, Present, and Future. Iskra Books. ISBN 9798330613342
