= Kommunistische Partei (Germany) =

Communist Party Kommunistische Partei
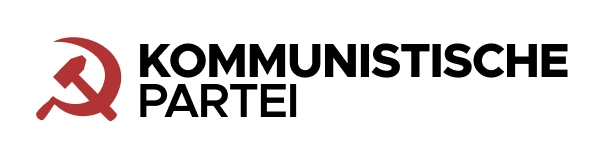
- Abbreviation: KP
- Leader: Central Committee
- Founded: June 2024
- Split from: German Communist Party
- Preceded by: Communist Organisation
- Ideology: Communism; Marxism-Leninism; Anti-revisionism
- Political position: Far-left

Website
- https://kommunistischepartei.de/

The Communist Party (German: Kommunistische Partei, KP) is a Marxist–Leninist party in Germany founded in June 2024. The party is an associated party of the European Communist Action.

== History ==
In the course of the internal discussion about the German Communist Party's orientation in relation to the anti-monopolistic strategy (AMS), some, mainly young members, left the party and the youth organization SDAJ because they rejected the AMS. They initially founded the group "What next?", from which the Communist Organization (German: Kommunistische Organisation, KO) emerged in mid-2018, which was eventually succeeded by the Communist Party when it emerged in June 2024.

=== Kommunistische Organisation (2018-2022) ===
In 2018, "What next?" initiative solidified into a formal, nationwide cadre organization known as the Communist Organization (German: Kommunistische Organisation, KO). The KO did not initially constitute itself as a formal political party; it functioned as a "pre-party" organization.

Its primary stated objective was to conduct a rigorous theoretical "clarification process" (German: Klärungsprozess) to study Marxist-Leninist theory, analyse modern German capitalism, and eventually establish a true, revolutionary communist party. They set up local chapters across Germany and engaged heavily in trade unions, schools and factory organizing.

=== 2022 internal split ===
Following the 2022 Russian invasion of Ukraine, the party experienced a defining turning point. The KO experienced a massive internal ideological split regarding how to characterize the war:

The Majority Faction (which later became the KP) argued that the war was a conflict between competing imperialist blocs (the US/NATO vs. Russia). They maintained that Russia is an imperialist power and that communists should not support either side, adhering to a traditional anti-war stance held by communists.

The Minority Faction argued that Russia was defending itself against imperialism expansion and that the primary enemy was NATO.

This disagreement escalated until the organization formally ruptured. The minority faction kept the original website and legal infrastructure of the KO. The majority faction which contained the bulk of the active members and leadership had to rebuild their external structures.

=== Foundation as the Kommunistische Partei (2024-present) ===
Following the split, the majority faction continued the creation of its program and strengthened its international alignments, becoming an associated party of the European Communist Action, a regional alliance of Anti-revisionist Marxist-Leninist parties.

In June 2024, at its national congress, the organization declared the preparatory phase complete. The group officially changed its name from Kommunistische Organisation to Kommunistische Partei (KP), transitioning into a multi-year formal "party-building process" (German: Gründungsprozess). On the Second Party Congress in April of 2026, the party realised its party program; Rather than immediately prioritizing mainstream electoral politics, the party's ongoing actives focus on the future establishment of a dedicated independent youth wing, as well as expanding enterprise and factory cells.

== Ideology ==
According to its party program, the organization adheres to anti-revisionist Marxist Leninism, seeking the revolutionary overthrow of capitalism and the establishment of a dictatorship of the proletariat. The party is structured according to the principles of democratic centralism and firmly supports proletarian internationalism, viewing global revolutions as a single, unified class struggle. The party has historically been supporters of Soviet leadership under Vladimir Lenin and Joseph Stalin, viewing subsequent Soviet leadership as revisionist. While it recognizes East Germany and the USSR as socialist states until the Revolutions of 1989, it rejects most modern communist governments as capitalist and revisionist, partly due to their adoption of market friendly principles; Cuba is the sole exception to this, which it still considers a legitimate socialist state. The party considers parties such as the Chinese Communist Party to have fallen into revisionism during the Sino-Soviet split. Furthermore, the party explicitly rejects Trotskyism, Maoism and Hoxhaism as revisionist deviations. Central to its platform are the ideas such as women's liberation, which the party argues is fundamental to working class liberation due to the inherent oppression of women under capitalism.
