= 1997 Hungarian NATO membership referendum =

Referendum in Hungary

- 16 November 1997
- Do you agree that the Republic of Hungary should join NATO to ensure the country's protection? (Note: Hungarian: Egyetért-e azzal, hogy a Magyar Köztársaság a NATO-hoz csatlakozva biztosítsa az ország védettségét?)

Results
Choice	Votes	%
Yes	3,344,131	85.33%
No	574,983	14.67%
Valid votes	3,919,114	98.87%
Invalid or blank votes	44,961	1.13%
Total votes	3,964,075	100.00%
Registered voters/turnout	8,059,039	49.19%
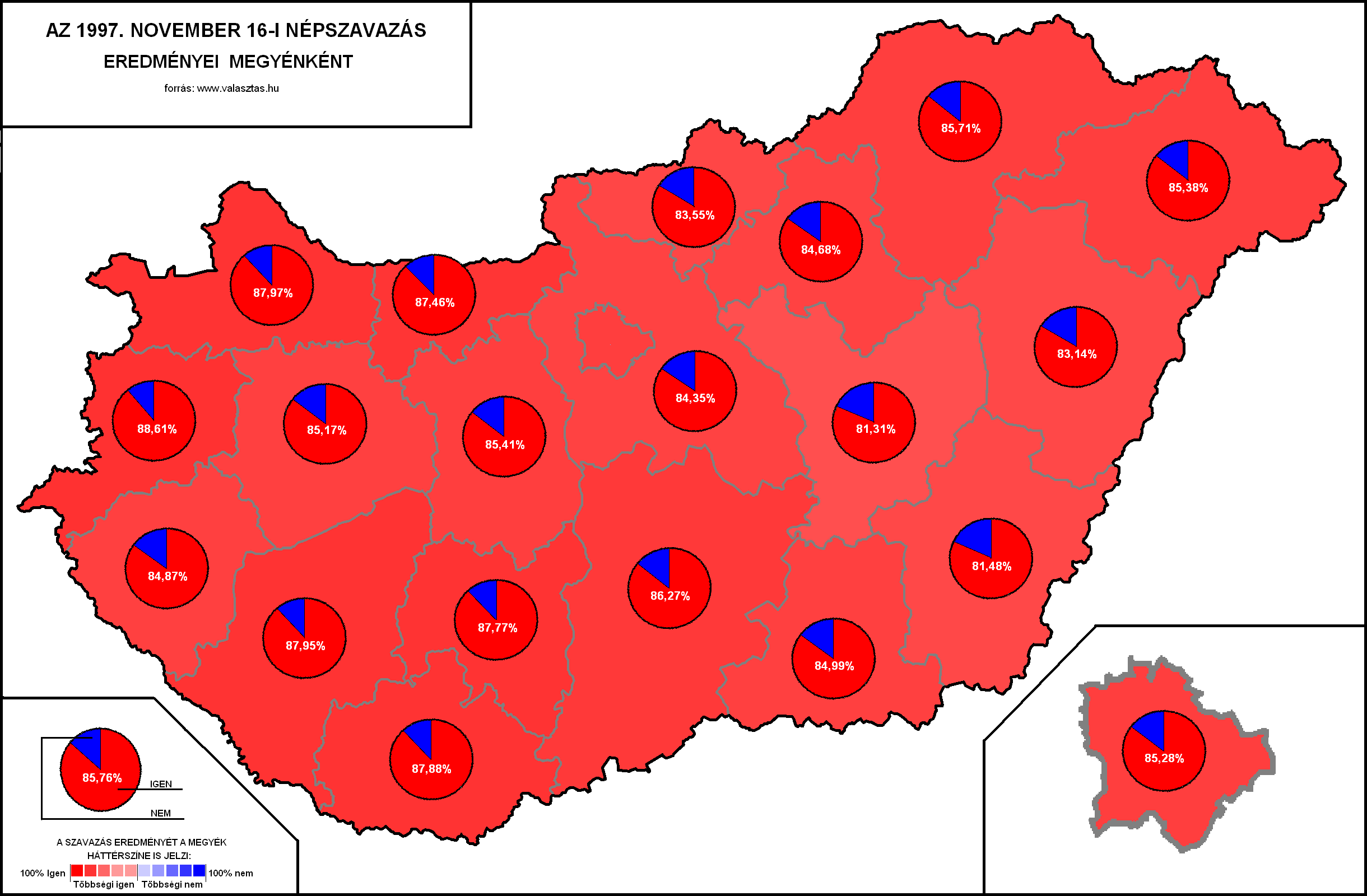
- Results by county

A referendum on joining NATO was held in Hungary on 16 November 1997. The proposal was approved by 85% of voters, with a voter turnout of 49%.

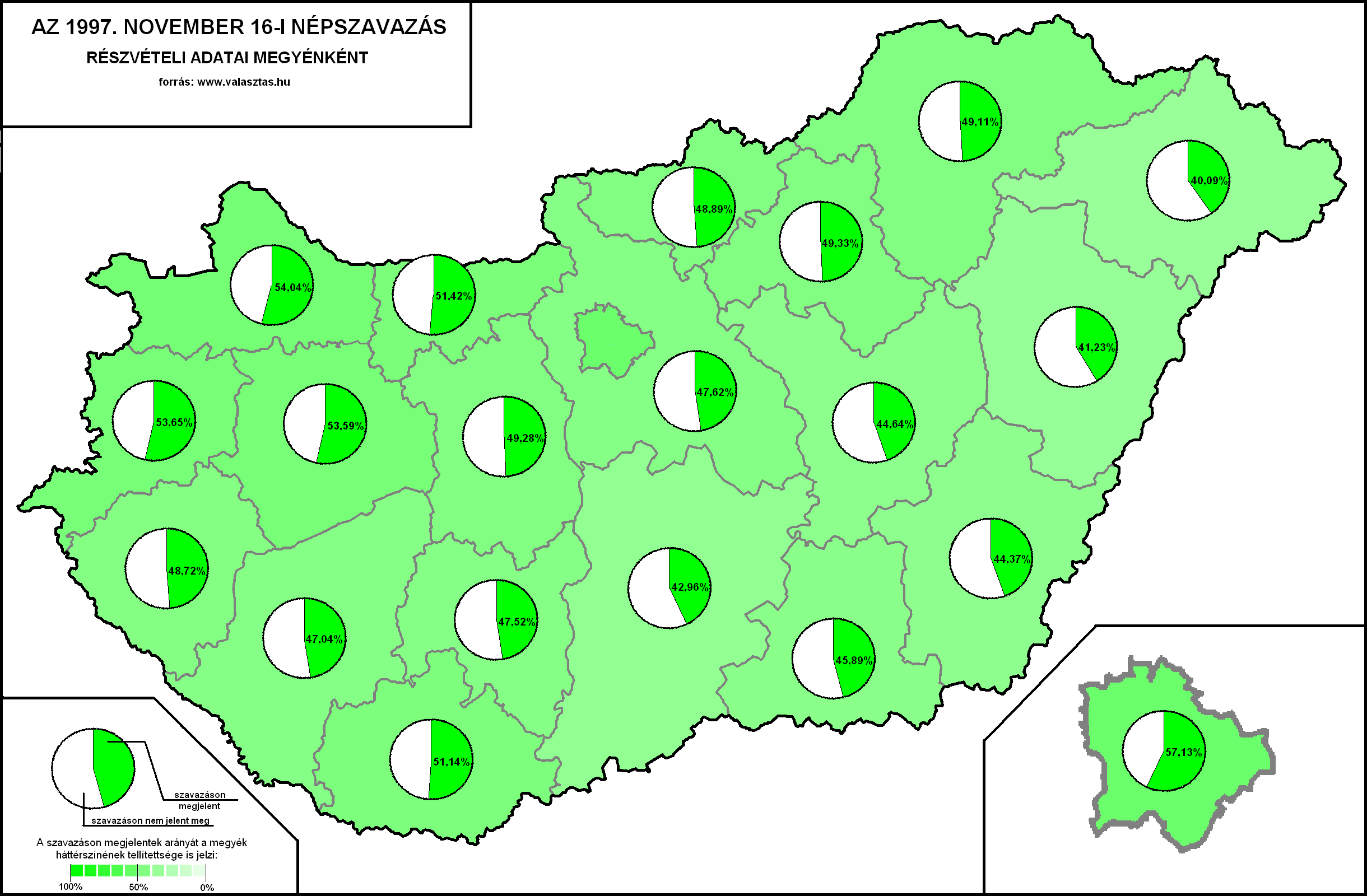
Participation rate in the 1997 NATO referendum

== Background ==
In 1996, the Hungarian Workers' Party organised a countrywide collection of signatures for a referendum on NATO membership. This HCWP-led referendum drive failed.

== Party policies ==
Position	Party
Yes	Hungarian Socialist Party
Yes	Fidesz
Yes	Hungarian Democratic Forum
Yes	Alliance of Free Democrats
Yes	Social Democratic Party of Hungary
Yes	Independent Smallholders' Party
Yes	Christian Democratic People's Party
No	Hungarian Justice and Life Party
No	Hungarian Worker's Party

== Results ==
Choice	Votes	%
For	3,344,131	85.33
Against	574,983	14.67
Total	3,919,114	100.00
Valid votes	3,919,114	98.87
Invalid/blank votes	44,961	1.13
Total votes	3,964,075	100.00
Registered voters/turnout	8,059,039	49.19
Source: Nohlen & Stöver

== See also ==
- Hungary and NATO
