= Initiative of Communist and Workers' Parties =

Former communist European political alliance

- Leader: Collective leadership
- Founder: Communist Party of Greece
- Founded: 1 October 2013; 12 years ago
- Dissolved: 9 September 2023; 2 years ago
- Succeeded by: European Communist Action
- Headquarters: Athens, Greece
- Ideology: Communism; Marxism–Leninism; Euroscepticism
- Political position: Far-left
- European Parliament group: Non-Inscrits
- International affiliation: IMCWP
- Colours: Red

Website
- initiative-cwpe.org

The Initiative of Communist and Workers' Parties (INITIATIVE), also known as the European Communist Initiative (ECI), was a Marxist–Leninist European political alliance. Founded by the Communist Party of Greece in 2013, the initiative had 30 member parties from all over Europe and the surrounding area.

Its goal was to "contribute to the research and study of issues concerning Europe, particularly concerning the EU, the political line which is drawn up in its framework and affects the lives of the workers, as well as to assist the elaboration of joint positions of the parties and the coordination of their solidarity and their other activities".

On 9 September 2023, the organisation was dissolved following ideological and political differences between the association's members over the topic of the Russian invasion of Ukraine. The European Communist Action was established on 18 November 2023 as a continuation of the INITIATIVE association created by the Communist Party of Greece.

== Member parties ==
Map of countries with member organizations of the Initiative of Communist and Workers' Parties. Member organizations are shown in red. Parties with parliamentary representation are shown in dark red. Parties which used to participate in meetings but did not join are shown in light red.

From INITIATIVE:

Country	Party	Last national or European election	National Lower Houses	European Parliament
Austria	Party of Labour of Austria (PdA, Partei der Arbeit Österreichs)	Did not contest	0 / 183	–
Belarus	Communist Party of the Workers of Belarus (BKPT, Kamunistyčnaja partyja pracoŭnych Bielarusi)	Did not contest	0 / 110	Not in EU
Bulgaria	Party of the Bulgarian Communists (PBK, Partiya na Bulgarskite Komunisti)	Did not contest	0 / 240	–
Bulgaria	Union of Communists in Bulgaria (SKB, Sayuz na Komunistite v Balgariya)	Did not contest	0 / 240	–
Croatia	Socialist Workers' Party of Croatia (SRP, Socijalistička radnička partija Hrvatske)	1,206 (0.06%)	0 / 151	–
Denmark	Communist Party in Denmark (KPiD, Kommunistisk Parti i Danmark)	Did not contest	0 / 175	–
Finland	Communist Workers' Party – For Peace and Socialism (KTP, Kommunistinen Työväenpuolue – Rauhan ja Sosialismin Puolesta)	1,240 (0.04%)	0 / 200	
France	Communist Revolutionary Party of France (PCRF, Parti communiste révolutionnaire de France)	259 (0,0%)	0 / 577	–
France	Pole of Communist Revival in France (PRCF, Pôle de renaissance communiste en France)	Did not contest	0 / 577	–
Georgia	Unified Communist Party of Georgia (SEKP, Sakartvelos Ertiani Komunisturi Partia)	Did not contest	0 / 150	Not in EU
Greece	Communist Party of Greece (KKE, Kommounistikó Kómma Elládas)	401,224 (7.69%)	21 / 300	2 / 21
Hungary	Hungarian Workers' Party (Magyar Munkáspárt)	14,452 (0.42%)	0 / 199	–
Republic of Ireland and Northern Ireland (part of United Kingdom)	Workers' Party (Páirtí na nOibrithe)	1,195 (0.1%) (Ireland)	0 / 160	–
Republic of Ireland and Northern Ireland (part of United Kingdom)	Workers' Party (Páirtí na nOibrithe)	839 (0.10%) (Northern Ireland)	0 / 90	–
Italy	Communist Party (PC, Partito Comunista)	235,467 (0.88%)	0 / 400 0 / 200	–
Latvia	Socialist Party of Latvia (LSP, Latvijas Sociālistīskā partija)	With Social Democratic Party "Harmony"	0 / 100	–
Lithuania	Socialist People's Front (SPF, Socialistinis liaudies frontas)	Did not contest	0 / 141	–
North Macedonia	Communist Party of Macedonia (KPM, Комунистичката партија на Македонија)	Did not contest	0 / 120	–
Malta	Communist Party of Malta (PK, Partit Komunista Malti)	Did not contest	0 / 67	–
Republic of Moldova	People's Resistance (Rezistența)	Did not contest	0 / 101	
Norway	Communist Party of Norway (NKP, Norges Kommunistiske Parti)	308 (0.00%)	0 / 169	Not in EU
Poland	Polish Communist Party (KPP, Komunistyczna Partia Polski (2002))	Did not contest	0 / 460	–
Russia	Communist Party of the Soviet Union (KPSS, Kommunističeskaja partija Sovetskogo Sojuza)	Did not contest	0 / 450	Not in EU
Russia	Russian Communist Workers' Party (RKRP, Rossiyskaya kommunisticheskaya rabochaya partiya)	Did not contest	0 / 450	Not in EU
Serbia	New Communist Party of Yugoslavia (NKPJ, Nova komunistička partija Jugoslavije)	Did not contest	0 / 250	Not in EU
Slovakia	Communist Party of Slovakia (KSS, Komunistická strana Slovenska)	6,199 (0.63%) (together with VZDOR)	0 / 150	–
Spain	Communist Party of the Workers of Spain (PCTE, Partido Comunista de los Trabajadores de España)	17,918 (0.07%)	0 / 350	–
Sweden	Communist Party of Sweden (SKP, Sveriges Kommunistiska Parti)	974 (0.02%)	0 / 349	–
Turkey	Communist Party of Turkey (TKP, Türkiye Komünist Partisi)	62,826 (0.12%)	0 / 600	Not in EU
United Kingdom (Great Britain only)	New Communist Party of Britain (NCP)	Did not contest	0 / 650	Not in EU

=== Former member parties ===
Country	Party	Notes
Czech Republic	Communist Party of Bohemia and Moravia	
Turkey	Communist Party (KP, Komünist Parti)	After the party split in 2014, the Communist Party took up the position in the INITIATIVE until its merger in 2017 within the Communist Party of Turkey
Spain	Communist Party of the Peoples of Spain	After the party split in 2017, the Communist Party of the Workers of Spain replaced the PCPE in INITIATIVE
Ukraine	Union of Communists of Ukraine (SKU, Soyuz komunistiv Ukrayini)	Banned per 2015 decommunism laws

== See also ==
- List of communist parties represented in European Parliament
- Party of the European Left
