= European Communist Action =

Communist European political alliance

- Abbreviation: ECA
- Leader: Collective leadership
- Founded: 18 November 2023; 3 years ago
- Preceded by: INITIATIVE
- Ideology: Communism; Marxism–Leninism; Anti-revisionism; Hard Euroscepticism
- Political position: Far-left
- European Parliament group: Non-Inscrits
- Colours: Red
- European Parliament: 2 / 720
- European Commission: 0 / 27
- European Council: 0 / 27
- European Lower Houses: 21 / 6,217
- European Upper Houses: 0 / 1,459

Website
- eurcomact.org

The European Communist Action (ECA) is a Marxist–Leninist European political alliance. It was established on 18 November 2023 after its predecessor organization, the European Communist Initiative (ECI), was dissolved.

The ECA is self-described as a "form of cooperation between Communist and Workers' Parties from member states of the EU, associated related states and other European countries". It was established with the aim of promoting scientific socialism, opposing the European Union (EU) and the North Atlantic Treaty Organization (NATO), and challenging capitalist exploitation and imperialism. The ECA regards the EU as an imperialist bloc and is dedicated to the principles of class struggle and the rights of workers, advocating for socialism as an alternative to the current capitalist system in Europe.

== History ==
The member parties of the ECA participated in the 2024 European Parliament elections. The parties of the ECA gathered 0.22% of the vote. The only ECA party to win seats in the EU parliament was the Communist Party of Greece (KKE), which won two seats.

== Positions ==
The ECA opposes NATO expansion and European Union militarisation, arguing that both contribute to imperialist rivalries and increase the risk of wider conflict. It has previously expressed support for the government of Cuba and has organized conferences and joint statements among its member parties on issues including anti-war mobilisation, labour rights, and opposing austerity.

== Membership ==
The founding meeting was attended by delegations from 12 parties in Europe, with the creation of its founding charter.

== Member parties ==
Country	Party	2024 European Parliament election	Seats in European Parliament
Austria	Party of Labour of Austria (Partei der Arbeit Österreichs, PdA)	Did not contest	0 / 20
France	Communist Revolutionary Party of France (Note: Not to be confused with the Communist Revolutionary Party) (Parti Communiste Révolutionnaire de France, PCRF)	Did not contest	0 / 81
Greece	Communist Party of Greece (Κομμουνιστικό Κόμμα Ελλάδας, ΚΚΕ)	367,796 (9.3%)	2 / 21
Ireland + Northern Ireland (part of the (United Kingdom) UK)	Workers Party (Note: The ECA participant is the breakaway faction from the 2021 Workers' Party split, not The Workers' Party) (Páirtí na nOibrithe)	Did not contest	0 / 14
Italy	Communist Front (Fronte Comunista, FC)	Did not contest	0 / 76
Finland	Communist Workers' Party – For Peace and Socialism (Kommunistinen työväenpuolue – rauhan ja sosialismin puolesta, KTP)	Did not contest	0 / 15
Netherlands	Communist Party of the Netherlands (Communistische Partij van Nederland, CPN)	Did not contest	0 / 31
Spain	Communist Party of the Workers of Spain (Partido Comunista de los Trabajadores de España, PCTE)	15,281 (0.09%)	0 / 61
Sweden	Communist Party of Sweden (Sveriges Kommunistiska Parti, SKP)	1,629 (0.04%)	0 / 21
Switzerland	Swiss Communist Party (Note: Not to be confused with the defunct Communist Party of Switzerland (1921–1944) or the current Communist Party (since 1944)) (Parti Communiste Suisse) (Kommunistische Partei der Schweiz) (Partito Comunista Svizzero)	Not part of the European Union	
Turkey	Communist Party of Turkey (Türkiye Komünist Partisi, TKP)	Not part of the European Union	
Ukraine	Union of Communists of Ukraine (Союз комуністів України, СКУ)	Not part of the European Union	

== Associated parties ==
The parties listed below are parties that are not official members of the ECA, but have expressed a general agreement with the positions of the ECA.

Country	Party	2024 European Parliament election	Seats in European Parliament
Argentina	Argentinian Communist Party (Note: This party is a split from the Communist Party of Argentina) (Partido Comunista Argentino, PCA)	Not part of the European Union	
Brazil	Revolutionary Brazilian Communist Party (Note: Not to be confused with the current Revolutionary Communist Party (since 1966) or the defunct Brazilian Revolutionary Communist Party (1968–1980)) (Partido Comunista Brasileiro Revolucionário, PCBR)	Not part of the European Union	
Germany	Communist Party of Germany (Note: Not to be confused with the German Communist Party (DKP; founded 1968) or the Communist Party (KP; founded 2024)) (Kommunistische Partei Deutschlands, KPD)	Did not contest	0 / 96
Germany	Communist Party (Note: Not to be confused with the German Communist Party (DKP; since 1968) or the Communist Party of Germany (KPD; since 1990)) (Kommunistische Partei, KP)	Did not contest	0 / 96
Kazakhstan	Socialist Movement of Kazakhstan (Социалистическое Движение Казахстана)	Not part of the European Union	
Mexico	Communist Party of Mexico (Note: Not to be confused with the defunct Mexican Communist Party (1917–1981) or the current Communist Party of Mexico (Marxist–Leninist) (since 1978)) (Partido Comunista de México, PCM)	Not part of the European Union	
Russia	Organisation of Communists (Организация Коммунистов, ОК)	Not part of the European Union	
Russia	Russian Communist Party (Internationalists) (Российская Коммунистическая Партия (интернационалистов), РКП(и))	Not part of the European Union	
United Kingdom	Communist Vanguard	Not part of the European Union	
United States	Communist Workers' Platform of the United States of America (CWPUSA)	Not part of the European Union	
Venezuela	Communist Party of Venezuela (Partido Comunista de Venezuela, PCV)	Not part of the European Union	

== See also ==
- Communist International
- International Meeting of Communist and Workers' Parties
