= National Union of Ghana Students =

Statutory national student body of Ghana

The National Union of Ghana Students (NUGS) is a statutorily mandated and government-sanctioned student representative body in Ghana. It was established by an Act of Parliament and operates under the supervision of the Ministry of Education of Ghana.

NUGS traces its historical origins to the Union of Gold Coast Students, an organization active in West Africa during the 1930s tha decolonisation and independence. While the precise date of the Union’s formal establishment has been debated. Its official channels have at various times cited 1962 or 1964, while notable alumni such as Anselmus Kludze claimed to have served as National President from 1962 to 1963, succeeding P. D. Vanderpuije of the then University of Science and Technology (UST) and preceding F. Y. I. Fiagbe. During this period, several NUGS leaders were reportedly arrested under the Preventive Detention Act.

As a recognized national body, NUGS engages with the Ministry of Education, relevant government agencies, and educational institutions in Ghana on matters of student welfare, educational access, quality assurance, and policy reform. The organization coordinates the activities of various student. The representative blocs are Graduate Students Association (GRASAG), University Students Association of Ghana (USAG), Private Universities Students Association Ghana (PUSAG), Teacher Training Association of Ghana (TTAG) and the Diaspora Bloc. The blocs cut across basic, secondary, tertiary, and international levels, providing a unified platform for advocacy and representation. Through its statutory mandate, NUGS supports national-educational development initiatives and contributes to governmental dialogues on youth and academic affairs.

NUGS is non-partisan and operates through democratic structures that include elected executives and congresses composed of representatives from affiliated student groups. The Union also participates in regional and continental student networks and is a member of the All-Africa Students Union.

== Aims ==
The paramount amongst the aims include, to protect and safeguard the interest of Ghanaian students and offer a common platform for discussion of various issues pertinent to student life, as well as gathering student views on national and international issues.

== Leadership ==
- President/CEO - Rashid Ibrahim Esq.
- General Secretary - Benedict Amelorku
- Secretary for Finance - Emmanuel Akwesi Agyei
- Women's Development Secretary - Masiata Sufyani
- Secretary for Education - Bismark Osei Bekoe
- International Relations Sec. - Emmanuel Owusu Amponsah
- Entrepreneurship & Skills Dev - Titus Owusu Darko
- Societies & Welfare Sec - Ellen Appiah
- Sec. for Union Development - John Arthur Jnr.
- Sec. for Projects & Programs - Paul Amoldago
- Sec. for Press & Information - Afful Owusu

== See also ==
Education in Ghana
