= Students Union of Bhutan =

Organization in Bhutan

Students Union of Bhutan ་ཨེ་ཤི་ཡ་ལུ་ཆགས་ཏིའབྲུག་ཡུལ་
- Founded: March 23 1988
- Headquarters: Kanglung, Bhutan
- International affiliation: WFDY
- Newspaper: Bhutan Focus

The Students Union of Bhutan (Dzongkha: ་ཨེ་ཤི་ཡ་ལུ་ཆགས་ཏིའབྲུག་ཡུལ་་) is a political human rights organization formed by Bhutanese students, founded on March 23, 1988. The purpose of the organisation is to increase the participation of students in Bhutanese society, and to promote the ideals of democracy and freedom of individuals. The union was formed at a time for when it was unlawful to form any kind of association or union within the kingdom. The Students Union of Bhutan was forced to operate from outside of the country following government crackdowns and arrest of some of its activists in late 1989,

The Students Union of Bhutan's origins grew from the Nepali Literary Society, the organisation was considered informal and underground, and had a membership of 25 activists. Upon founding in 1988, the society distributed pamphlets and other printed articles highlighting state-sponsored discrimination and atrocities in regards to Bhutanese refugees. The union keeps close contact with other human rights organisations in Bhutan, and has established schools for refugees of Nepali origin residing in Bhutan. Since 1990, a monthly printed publication entitled Bhutan Focus has been distributed.
