= All-Africa Students Union =

Continental student union

The All-Africa Students Union (AASU) is the umbrella organization of 75 national student unions from 54 countries, representing 170 million students across the African continent.

== History ==
In 1972, student representatives from ten African countries gathered at the Kwame Nkrumah University of Science and Technology in Kumasi, Ghana, to attend the first Congress of the All-Africa Students Union. Inspired by the Organisation of African Unity, the Congress aimed to unify students across the African continent in the spirit of Pan-Africanism.

In 1973, the second Congress of the All-Africa Students Union was held in Dar es Salaam, Tanzania. In 1974, the third Congress of the All-Africa Students Union was held in Alexandria, Egypt. In 1976, the fourth Congress of the All-Africa Students Union was held in Accra, Ghana, attended by the African National Congress and the South West African People Organization. In 1982, at the sixth Congress of the All-Africa Students Union in Addis Ababa, Ethiopia, June 16 was declared African Students' Day, known as the Day of the African Child, in honor of the students who lost their lives in the Soweto Uprising. In 1987, the seventh Congress of the All-Africa Students Union was held in Luanda, Angola. In 1992, the eighth Congress of the All-Africa Students Union was held in Accra, Ghana. In 2000, the ninth Congress of the All-Africa Students Union was held in Tripoli, Libya, recognized by the United Nations for advancing students rights and expanding access to education across the African continent.

== Governance ==
The All-Africa Students Union is governed by three constitutionally-mandated decision-making bodies: the Congress, the Executive Committee, and the Secretariat.

=== Congress ===
The Congress is the highest decision-making body of the All-Africa Students Union. Convened on a quadrennial basis, the Congress is composed of delegates from the All-Africa Students Union membership. Autonomous and operating according to principles of democratic decision-making, the Congress may amend the Constitution, and is charged with oversight of the Executive Committee and the Secretariat.

=== Executive Committee ===
The second decision-making arm of the All-Africa Students Union, the Executive Committee comprises the President; five Regional Vice Presidents (representing North Africa, South Africa, West Africa, East and Central Africa); five Executive Committee Representatives and six officers of the Secretariat, including the Secretary-General, Deputy Secretary-General, Secretary for Education, Secretary for Student Rights, Secretary for Press and Information, Secretary for Gender and International Relations, and Secretary for Finance and Administration. The Executive Committee provides political leadership, executes policies and programs adopted by the Congress, examines membership applications, and makes recommendations to the Congress.

=== Secretariat ===
Located in Accra, Ghana, and headed by the Secretary-General, the Secretariat serves as the headquarters of the All-Africa Students Union. The Secretariat is composed of six tenured staff elected by the Congress. and locally recruited permanent staff. Tenured staff are democratically elected officers who serve in positions mandated by the Congress in accordance with the Constitution, including the offices of the Secretary-General, Deputy Secretary-General, Secretary for Education and Students Rights, Secretary for Press and Information, Secretary for International Relations, and Secretary for Administration.

Permanent staff members are recruited by the Secretariat under the auspices of the Ministry of Foreign Affairs and Regional Integration of the Republic of Ghana. By statutory provisions, technical staff of the All-Africa Students Union are civil servants under the Supreme Law of Ghana, working under Finance, Audit, Human Resource, Operations, Technical, Programmes, Research and Communications. Personnel undergoing national service can be assigned to the staff of the All-Africa Students Union for a period of one year.

== Membership ==
| Country | Name | AASU Abbrev. |
|---|---|---|
| Algeria | l'Union Nationale des Étudiants Algériens | UNEA |
| Egypt | Students' Representative Council, Alexandria University | SRC-AU |
| Egypt | Students' Representative Council, Cairo University | SRC-CU |
| Libya | General Union of Libyan Student | GULS |
| Mauritania | L'Union nationale des étudiants mauritaniens | UNEM |
| Mauritania | Students' Representative Council, Université De Nouakchott | SRC-UN |
| Morocco | L'Union nationale des étudiants du Maroc | UNEM |
| Tunisia | Union Général Tunisienne Des Étudiants | UGTE |
| Benin | La Fédération Nationale des Étudiants du Benin | FNEB |
| Burkina Faso | La Fédération Estudiantine Et Scolaire Pour L’intégrité au Burkina Faso | FESCIBF |
| Cape Verde | Federação Nacional de Estudantes e Desporto Universitário | FNEDU |
| Côte d'Ivoire | Fédération estudiantine et scolaire de Côte d'Ivoire | FESCI |
| Côte d'Ivoire | Counseil National des Jeunes de Côte d'Ivoire | CNJCI |
| Gambia | National Union of Gambia Students | NUGS |
| Ghana | National Union of Ghana Students | NUGS |
| Ghana | Graduate Students Association of Ghana | GRASAG |
| Ghana | Ghana National Union of Technical Students | GNUTS |
| Ghana | Ghana Union of Professional Students | GUPS |
| Ghana | University Students Association of Ghana | USAG |
| Ghana | Union Scolaire et Estudiantine de Guinée | USEG |
| Guinea-Bissau | Plataforma Nacional das Associações Acadêmicas do Ensino Médio e Superior da Guiné Bissau | PNAAEMS-GB |
| Guinea-Bissau | The National Confederation of Student Associations of Guinea-Bissau | CONAEGUIB |
| Mali | Association Des Élèves Et Étudiants Du Mali | AEEM |
| Niger | Union Des Scolaires Niger | USN |
| Nigeria | Postgraduate Students Association of Nigeria | PSAN |
| Nigeria | National Association of Nigerian Students | NANS |
| Senegal | Students' Representative Council, Cheikh Anta Diop University | SRC-CADU |
| Sierra Leone | National Union of Sierra Leone Students | NUSS |
| Togo | Union National des Étudiants du Togo | UNETO |
| Angola | Union Nationale des Étudiants d'Angola | UNEA |
| Angola | Student Association, Universidade Agostinho Neto | UAN |
| Botswana | Botswana United Students Association | BUSA |
| Eswatini | Swaziland National Union of Students | SNUS |
| Lesotho | United Lesotho Students Association | ULSA |
| Zimbabwe | Malawi National Students Union | MANASU |
| Mozambique | União dos Estudantes Moçambicanos | UEM |
| Mozambique | Association of University Finalist Students of Mozambique | AEFUM |
| Namibia | Namibian National Students Organization | NANSO |
| South Africa | South African Union of Students | SAUS |
| South Africa | South African Students Congress | SASCO |
| Zambia | Zambia National Students Union | ZANASU |
| Zimbabwe | Zimbabwe National Students Union | ZINASU |
| Zimbabwe | Zimbabwe Congress of Students Union | ZICOSU |
| Cameroon | L'Association des Étudiants de l'Université de Yaoundé | AEUY |
| Cameroon | Students' Representative Council of International Relations Institute of Cameroon | SRC-IRIC |
| Central African Republic | L'Association nationale des étudiants centrafricains | ANEC |
| Chad | Union Nationale des Étudiants Tchadiens | UNET |
| Republic of the Congo | Mouvement des Élèves et Étudiants du Congo | MEEC |
| Democratic Republic of Congo | Représentation des Étudiants du Congo | RDC |
| Equatorial Guinea | Students' Representative Council of Universidad Nacional De Guinea Equatorial | SRC-UNGE |
| Gabon | Union Nationale des Etudiants du Gabon | UNEG |
| Sao Tome and Principe | Federação Nacional das Associações Acadêmicas da Universidade de São Tomé e Príncipe | FNAA-USTP |
| Sao Tome and Principe | Students' Representative Council of Universidade Lusíada de São Tomé e Príncipe | SRP-ULSTP |
| Burundi | Burundi National Students Union | BNSU |
| Comoros | Union Nationale de Jeunesse et des Etudiants des Comoros | UNJEC |
| Eritrea | National Union of Eritrean Youth and Students | NUEYS |
| Ethiopia | Ethiopian Higher Education Students Union | EHEISU |
| Kenya | University of Nairobi Students Association | UNSA |
| Kenya | Kenya University Students' Organisation | KUSO |
| Madagascar | Students' Representative Council, Université d'Antananarivo | SRC-UA |
| Madagascar | Comite Democratic Des Jeunes Et Des Etudiants De Madagascar | CDJEM |
| Mauritius | Council of Students & Youth Movement of Mauritius | COSYM |
| Rwanda | Rwanda National Students' Association | RNSA |
| Seychelles | Students' Representative Council, University of Seychelles | SRC-US |
| Somalia | Somalia Higher Education Students Union | SHESU |
| Sudan | General Sudanese Students Union | GSSU |
| South Sudan | South Sudanese Students Union | SSSU |
| Tanzania | Tanzania Higher Learning Institution Students Organisation | TAHLISO |
| Uganda | Uganda National Students Association | UNSA |

== See also ==
- European Students' Union
