= Frente Juvenil Revolucionario =

Frente Juvenil Revolucionario (FJR) is the youth organization of the Mexican Partido Revolucionario Institucional PRI. The main activities is the formation of young men and women that want to participate in political life in Mexico. This youth organization was a member of the World Federation of Democratic Youth.

The activities of the FJR and its militants, as described in the PRI statutes, have four general purposes: participate in the struggle for development of the Mexican people, achieve positions of leadership and elected office, support the political campaigns of the party, and promote the affiliation and participation of more youths in the party (ibid., Art. 43).
