= Liberation Support Movement =

The Liberation Support Movement (LSM) was a Communist and Third Worldist activist organisation based in Vancouver, British Columbia, Canada, and Oakland, California, in the United States. The group was active from 1968 until 1982, and it supported indigenous resistance movements in former colonial countries, mainly in Africa.

== History ==
The LSM was founded by American anthropologist Donald Barnett in 1968. Barnett had studied liberation struggles in Africa, writing his thesis at UCLA about the Mau Mau rebel group in Kenya. Barnett then spent parts of the 1960s in Africa collecting oral histories from members of rebel movements, including the Popular Movement for the Liberation of Angola (MPLA). Upon returning to North America, Barnett accepted a teaching position at Simon Fraser University in Burnaby, British Columbia. From there, he started the LSM, gathering support from the anti-war movement in the United States.

The LSM had members in Seattle, Washington, the San Francisco Bay Area in California, and in New York City by the early 1970s. The organization was aligned with Marxist-Leninist political ideals. After Barnett's death from a heart attack in 1975, LSM headquarters moved from Vancouver to Oakland. The organization disbanded in 1982.
