= National Union of Eritrean Youth and Students =

NUEYS
- National Union of Eritrean Youth and Students
- Founded: 1978
- Headquarters: Keskese St. 173 No. 27, Asmara, Eritrea
- Location: Eritrea

The National Union of Eritrean Youth and Students (NUEYS) is dedicated to improving the skills and awareness of Eritrean youth. The organization seeks to strengthen and improve the youth in all aspects on the regional, national and international levels.

NUEYS has branches throughout Eritrea as well as the world to serve the Diaspora.

NUEYS is a member of the All-Africa Students Union.
