= Aasu, Estonia =

Village in Estonia

Aasu
- Village
- Location within Estonia
- Country: Estonia
- County: Lääne-Viru County
- Parish: Haljala Parish
- Time zone: UTC+2 (EET)
  - Summer (DST): UTC+3 (EEST)

Aasu is a village in Haljala Parish, Lääne-Viru County, in northeastern Estonia.

== Name ==
Aasu was attested in historical sources as Азокюля (Azokjulja; i.e. 'Azo village') circa 1900. The name Aasu is derived from the common noun aasu, referring to a bend in a river or a meadow in such a bend.
