= Communist Front (Italy) =

Political party in Italy

Communist Front Fronte Comunista
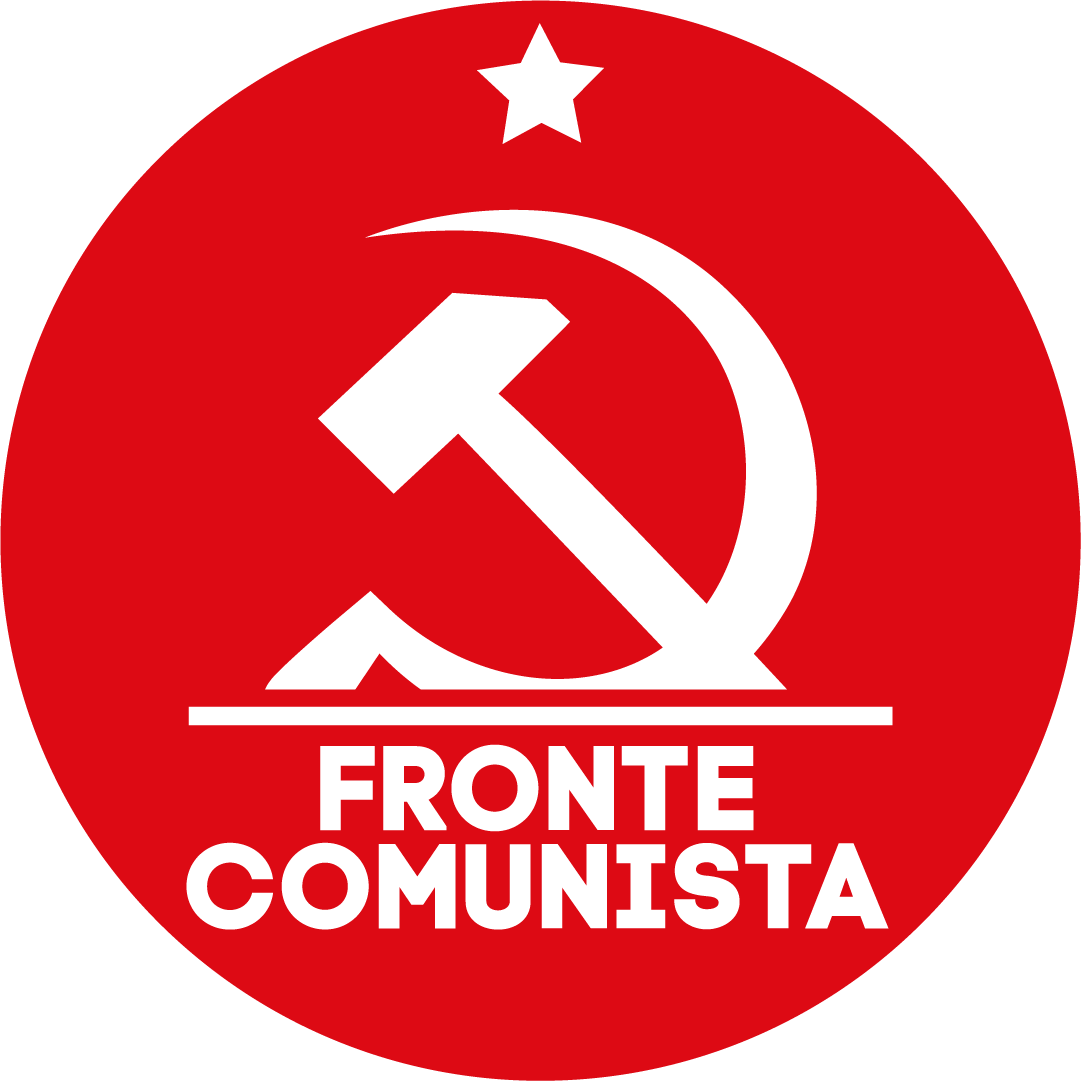
- Abbreviation: FC
- Founded: November 2021
- Youth wing: Front of Communist Youth
- Ideology: Communism; Marxism–Leninism; Anti-imperialism; Anti-revisionism
- European affiliation: European Communist Action
- Colors: Red

Website
- https://www.frontecomunista.it/

The Communist Front (Italian: Fronte Comunista) is an anti-revisionist Marxist–Leninist party in Italy that was founded in 2021.

Its stated purpose is to "play a role in the regrouping and unification of revolutionary forces into a communist party that is strong, consistently Marxist-Leninist, homogeneous ideologically and politically, clear and consequential in tactics and strategy, adequate to the historical phase in which we live and to the struggles that await the workers against the indiscriminate attacks of the employers' front".

The Front of Communist Youth joined the Communist Front in 2021 after splitting from the Communist Party in 2020. In November 2023, the Communist Front took part in the creation of the European Communist Action.

== History ==
The FC publicly announced its creation in January 2021 through a founding statement published on its official website.

== Ideology ==
The FC presents itself as a Marxist-Leninist organisation and frames its political line around the "reconstruction" on a revolutionary communist party in Italy.

It emphasises reaffirming Marxism-Leninism as a revolutionary theory and rejects what it characterises as the long-standing "opportunist" and "reformist" drift of the post-PCI Italian left.

The FC adopts a Leninist definition of imperialism, and argues that contemporary conflicts should be understood primarily as inter-imperialist competition rather than a simple divide between "imperialist" and "anti-imperialist" states. On this basis, the FC rejects that blocs such as the BRICS, or capitalist states opposing the United States/European Union deserve political alignment.

It criticises China for having abandoned scientific socialism in favour of market socialism. The FC views China and Russia as "new capitalist powers".

Regarding NATO, the FC supports Italy's unilateral exit and the closure of US/NATO bases on Italian territory. The FC criticises rhetoric centred on NATO's abstract "dissolution" as opportunist. It rejects that exiting NATO should simply be a matter of repositioning a capitalist Italy within the system of international alliances. It cites France's 1966 withdrawal from NATO's integrated military command as evidence that inter-imperialist contradictions can push states against NATO while retaining imperialism.

On the European Union, the FC advocates for Italy's exit from both it and the euro. However, it rejects what it calls "bourgeois sovereignism" and the so-called Euroscepticism of both the right and the left. It views Italy's exit from the EU and the euro as a necessary, but not sufficient condition for bringing the working class to power. It argues that a subsequent overthrow of the bourgeois state will be necessary, and rejects a return to previous forms of national sovereignty with capitalism.
