= Communist Youth of Denmark =

Danmarks Kommunistiske Ungdom (Communist Youth of Denmark), was the youth wing of Danmarks Kommunistiske Parti (Communist Party of Denmark). DKU had its origins in Socialdemokratisk Ungdomsforbund (Social Democratic Youth League) founded in 1906. The organization took the name DKU in 1919.

DKU was dissolved in 1990, but in 2009, a spiritual successor (established with the name "Ungkommunisterne", but renamed back to Danmarks Kommunistiske Ungdom during the organizations restart in 2021) was founded as an independent organization shared informally between the Communist Party of Denmark, the Communist Party in Denmark, and the Communist Party (Denmark), which still participates in the World Federation of Democratic Youth.

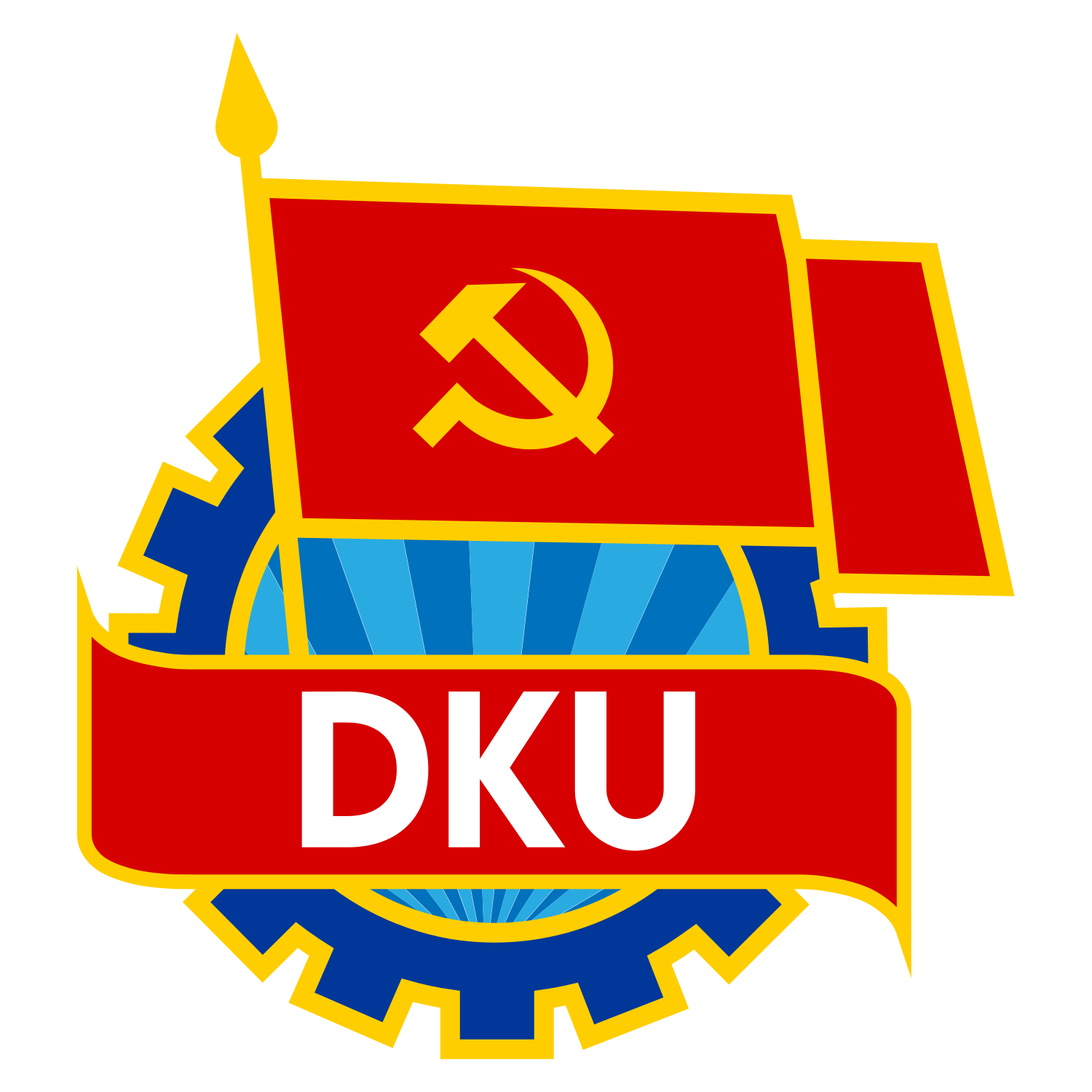
Denmark's Communist Youth, (Danish: Danmarks Kommunistiske Ungdom) DKU (2009). Young Communist League (DKU) (since 2009)^{da}

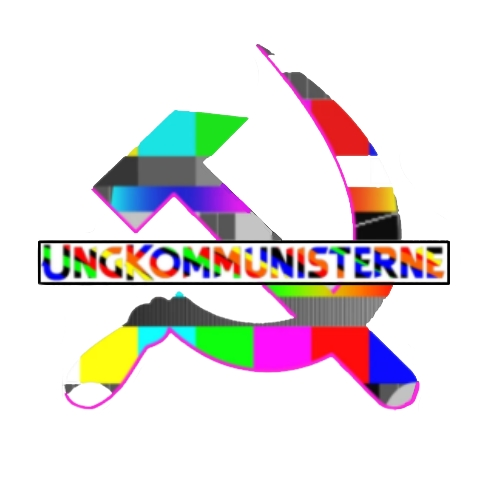
Young Communist
