= Progressive Youth Association =

The Progressive Youth Organization (Turkish: İlerici Gençler Derneği - İGD) was the legal youth organization of the outlawed Communist Party of Turkey (TKP). It was founded on 6 January 1976.

== History ==
The İGD developed close relations with trade unions and other progressive organizations, took part in May Day celebrations, protests against DGMs (State Security Courts) and campaigns against the far-right Nationalist Movement Party and its youth organization. It organized international solidarity activities for Chile, Iran, Palestine and others, and campaigned on issues including safety of life and freedom of education, and democratization of textbooks. It worked in close cooperation with the Progressive High School Students Organization (İLD) and the Apprentices' Organization (Çırak–Der).

It also worked for unity of the broader progressive youth movement, especially developing cooperation with other youth organizations such as Genç Öncü ("Young Vanguard"), the Socialist Youth League, and the Kurdish Revolutionary Democratic Culture Organization (DDKD).

The organization was banned on 6 November 1979 by the martial law authorities, but continued its activities openly until the 12 September 1980 military coup d'état. It underwent a number of organizational changes during the military regime as the youth wing of the TKP, which was dissolved in a series of mergers after forming the United Communist Party of Turkey (TBKP) with the Workers' Party of Turkey (TİP), and then joining a new legal Socialist Unity Party in the early 1990s.
