= Hungarian Workers' Party =

Communist party in Hungary

Hungarian Workers' Party Magyar Munkáspárt
- Chairman: Gyula Thürmer
- Founded: 17 December 1989
- Split from: Hungarian Socialist Workers' Party
- Headquarters: 1046 Budapest, Munkácsy Mihály u. 51/a
- Newspaper: A Szabadság
- Youth wing: Baloldali Front
- Ideology: Communism; Marxism–Leninism; Left-wing nationalism; Social conservatism; Kádárism (alleged)
- Political position: Far-left
- National affiliation: Leftist Alliance
- European affiliation: INITIATIVE (2013–2023)
- International affiliation: IMCWP; WAP
- Colours: Red
- Slogan: "Workers of the world, unite!"
- National Assembly: 0 / 199
- European Parliament: 0 / 21
- County Assemblies: 0 / 381

Website
- munkaspart.hu

The Hungarian Workers' Party (HWP, Hungarian: Magyar Munkáspárt [ˈmɒɟɒr ˈmuŋkaːʃpaːrt]) is a Marxist-Leninist party in Hungary led by Gyula Thürmer. Established after the fall of the communist Hungarian People's Republic, the party has yet to win a seat in the Hungarian parliament. Until May 2009, it was a member of the Party of the European Left. It was formed from, and considers itself the successor to, the former ruling Hungarian Socialist Workers' Party. Despite having run in every parliamentary election since 1990, the party has never won seats.

== History ==
The party was established as the Hungarian Socialist Workers' Party on 17 December 1989 as a successor party of the Hungarian Socialist Workers' Party (MSZMP) by a small group of old MSZMP members who opposed its transformation into the Hungarian Socialist Party (MSZP). Among them was Károly Grósz, the last general secretary of the old MSZMP, who became the new party's acting chairman.

In the 1990 elections it received around 3% of the national vote, the largest share for a party that failed to win a seat.

In 1993 the party adopted the name Workers' Party, and in the same year a group of hard-liners broke away to form another Hungarian Socialist Workers' Party. In the 1994 elections, the party won a similar share of the vote, again emerging as the largest party without a seat. Despite increasing its vote share to around 4% in the 1998 elections, the party again remained seatless. In the 2002 elections, the party's vote share fell to around 2%, and for the first time since 1990, not the largest party without parliamentary representation.

On 12 November 2005 it became the Hungarian Communist Workers' Party when a split led to the formation of the Workers' Party of Hungary 2006 led by János Fratanolo. In the 2006 elections the party received less than 0.5% of the national vote, whilst in the 2010 elections, its vote share fell to just 0.1%. On 11 May 2013 the party was renamed again, this time becoming the Hungarian Workers' Party due to a law passed the previous year banning the public use of names associated with "authoritarian regimes of the 20th century." In the 2014 parliamentary election, the party received 0.56% of the votes, again the largest party without parliamentary seats.

== Ideology ==
The party opposed Hungary joining NATO. In 1996 the party organised a countrywide collection of signatures for a referendum on NATO membership. This HCWP-led referendum drive failed, although another referendum on NATO membership was held in 1997, which resulted in a vote in favour. The party continues to oppose the country's participation in NATO and other military organisations. It campaigns to have all Hungarian forces returned from abroad and to reduce the military budget. The party opposed NATO campaigns in Yugoslavia against Slobodan Milošević and the 2003 invasion of Iraq.

It supports the Communist People’s Republic of China. On the question of the 2016 migrant quota referendum, the party called for a "no" vote, expressing opposition to what it perceives as "EU aggression" against Hungary.

Other foreign policies are in favour of

- a peaceful and just settlement of the Middle East crisis, in favour of the "progressive" Arab countries.
- a foreign policy based upon "good relations" with all parts of the world.

After the 2022 Russian invasion of Ukraine, the party expressed its support for Russia. Thürmer said that "Russia has the right to reclaim it's ancient territorries", and that "Ukraine is not needed in this form, because it is a fictional country". They are in favor of leaving the European Union and NATO.

== Election results ==
=== National Assembly ===
Election	Leader	SMCs		MMCs		Seats	+/–	Status
Election	Leader	Votes	%	Votes	%	Seats	+/–	Status
1990	Gyula Thürmer	131,444	2.65% (#9)	180,899	3.68% (#7)	0 / 386	New	Extra-parliamentary
1994	Gyula Thürmer	177,458	3.29% (#7)	172,117	3.19% (#7)	0 / 386	0	Extra-parliamentary
1998	Gyula Thürmer	165,461	3.70% (#6)	183,071	4.08% (#6)	0 / 386	0	Extra-parliamentary
2002	Gyula Thürmer	108,732	1.93% (#6)	121,503	2.16% (#6)	0 / 386	0	Extra-parliamentary
2006	Gyula Thürmer	16,379	0.30% (#8)	21,955	0.41% (#6)	0 / 386	0	Extra-parliamentary
2010	Gyula Thürmer	5,668	0.11% (#10)	5,606	0.11% (#7)	0 / 386	0	Extra-parliamentary
Election	Leader	Constituency		Party list		Seats	+/–	Status
Election	Leader	Votes	%	Votes	%	Seats	+/–	Status
2014	Gyula Thürmer	12,716	0.26% (#8)	28,323	0.56% (#5)	0 / 199	0	Extra-parliamentary
2018	Gyula Thürmer	13,613	0.25% (#9)	15,640	0.27% (#10)	0 / 199	0	Extra-parliamentary
2022 (Note: Ran within Leftist Alliance (ISZOMM-MMP).)	Gyula Thürmer	8,678	0.16% (#7)	—N/a		0 / 199	0	Extra-parliamentary
2026 (Note: Ran within Leftist Alliance (SOLIDARITY))	Gyula Thürmer	4,187	0.07% (#7)	—N/a		0 / 199	0	Extra-parliamentary

=== European Parliament ===
Election year	# of overall votes	% of overall vote	# of overall seats won	±	Notes
2004	56,221	1.83% (6th)	0 / 24		
2009	27,829	0.96% (7th)	0 / 22	0	
2019	14,452	0.42% (9th)	0 / 21	0	

== Gallery ==
Logo from 1989 to 1993

Logo from 1993 to 2005

Logo from 2005 to 2013

Flag from 1993 to 2013
