= International =

International may refer to:

== Music ==
=== Albums ===
- International (Kevin Michael album), 2011
- International (New Order album), 2002
- International (Saint Etienne album), 2025
- International (The Three Degrees album), 1975
- International, 2018 album by L'Algérino

=== Songs ===
- The Internationale, the left-wing anthem
- "International" (Chase & Status song), 2014
- "International", by Adventures in Stereo from Monomania, 2000
- "International", by Brass Construction from Renegades, 1984
- "International", by Thomas Leer from The Scale of Ten, 1985
- "International", by Kevin Michael from International (Kevin Michael album), 2011
- "International", by McGuinness Flint from McGuinness Flint, 1970
- "International", by Orchestral Manoeuvres in the Dark from Dazzle Ships, 2003
- "International (Serious)", by Estelle from All of Me, 2012
- "International", by Chali 2na from Fish Outta Water, 2009
- "International", by Sweet Trip from Velocity : Design : Comfort, 2003

== Politics ==
- Internationalism (politics)
- Political international, any transnational organization of political parties having a similar ideology or political orientation
- First International (1864–1876), known as the International Workingmen's Association (est. London 1864 - 1876)
- International Anarchist Congresses, including:
  - International Working People's Association (1881–1887)
  - IWA–AIT (est. 1922)
  - International of Anarchist Federations (IFA; est. 1968)
- Second International (1889–1916), founded after the expulsion of Anarchists from the First International, and a direct ancestor of the Socialist International
- Third International (1919–1943), known as the Communist International or Comintern, founded by Vladimir Lenin
- Fourth International (1938–), founded by Leon Trotsky in opposition to the corruption of the Comintern by Stalinism
- Socialist International (1951–), founded as the Labour and Socialist International (1919–1940), and refounded as the Socialist International in 1951
- Fifth International, a widely mooted but never established successor to the previous Internationals
- Liberal International, the political international federation for liberal political parties
- Centrist Democrat International, the Christian Democrat International
- Democratic International, a 1985 meeting of anti-Communist rebels held at the headquarters of UNITA in Jamba, Angola
- Resistance International, an international anti-communist organization that existed between 1983 and 1988
- Pirate Parties International, a not-for-profit international non-governmental organization
- National International, a Nationwide Mutual Insurance Company-like Company

== Sports ==
- International sport
- Cap (sport), a player's appearance in a game at an international level
- WTA International tournaments, tournaments of the Women's Tennis Association
- International FK, a former name of Molde FK, Norwegian association football club
- A former name of the Scottish Open (snooker), a professional snooker tournament

== Transportation ==
- International (GN train), a Great Northern Railway service between Vancouver, British Columbia and Seattle, Washington
- International (Amtrak train), an Amtrak service between Chicago, Illinois and Toronto, Ontario
- Damascus–Amman train, colloquially referred to as International Train, an international train between Damascus, Syria and Amman, Jordan
- International Motors, a US-based manufacturer of trucks, buses and diesel engines, formerly known as Navistar
- International, a marque used by American manufacturer International Harvester

== Other uses ==
- International Mountain, a mountain in Canada
- International Paint, a brand of the AkzoNobel business unit Marine and Protective Coating
- International, California, former name of Walkermine, California
- Miss International, a beauty pageant based in Tokyo, Japan
- Radio International, later Radio i, the former name of New Zealand radio station Mix (radio station)

== See also ==
- Internationality
- "The Internationale", the socialist anthem
- Internationale (disambiguation)
- The International (disambiguation)
- International style (disambiguation)
- Multinational (disambiguation)
- Transnational (disambiguation)
- Supranational (disambiguation)
- Subnational (disambiguation)
