= Internacional (disambiguation) =

SC Internacional is a Brazilian football club from Porto Alegre.

Internacional may also refer to:

== Sports ==
=== Brazil ===
- Associação Atlética Internacional (Bebedouro), Brazilian football club from Bebedouro
- Associação Atlética Internacional (Limeira), Brazilian football club from Limeira
- Esporte Clube Internacional, Brazilian football club from Santa Maria
- Internacional Foot-Ball Club, Brazilian football club from Curitiba
- SC Internacional (SP), Brazilian football club from São Paulo

=== Equatorial Guinea ===
- Estadio Internacional, Equatoguinean stadium located in Malabo

=== Spain ===
- Internacional de Madrid, Spanish football club from Madrid

== Entertainment ==
- Caracol TV Internacional, Colombia
- RTP Internacional, Portugal
- SIC Internacional, Portugal
- TVE Internacional, Spain
- Internacional (album)

== See also ==
- Inter (disambiguation)
- Inter Milan (disambiguation)
- International (disambiguation)
- Internazionale (disambiguation)
