= Budapest Complex =

2023 attacks in Budapest

- Date: February 9 to 11, 2023 (attacks)
- Location: Budapest, Hungary (attacks); Hungary, Germany, Italy, France, Finland (investigations and arrests)
- Caused by: Day of Honor
- Result: Arrest of several far-left assailants; Extradition requests made by Hungary to Germany; Classification of Antifa-Ost as a terrorist organization by Hungary and the United States in 2025

Parties
Far-Right groups (Hungary) Hungarian Far-right: Légio Hungária; Divízió 88; (Germany) German Far-right (Poland) Polish Far-right: National Movement	Far-Left groups: Antifa (Germany); Antifa-Ost	Hungary: Rendőrség; Germany: Saxon State Police; Public Prosecutor General (Note: Took over investigations in Germany in March 2024)

Casualties and losses
9 injured (Note: 4 Hungarians, 3 Poles and 2 Germans)	15 arrested (Note: 2 Germans, 1 Italian in February 2023, 1 German and 1 Italian in November 2023, 1 Albanian in the first months of 2024 (and again in February and December 2025), 1 German in May 2024, 1 German in November 2024, 6 Germans and 1 Syrian in January 2025)	None

The term Budapest Complex (German: Budapest-Komplex) refers to several assaults that occurred in Budapest in February 2023, aimed at right-wing extremists in the days preceding the neo-Nazi "Day of Honor" demonstration. These attacks were attributed by Hungarian and German authorities to far-left militants from the antifa movement, among whom there are some individuals already involved in the Dresden left-wing extremists trial.

== Events ==
The "Day of Honor" represents one of the main neo-Nazi commemorations in Europe, with thousands of participants celebrating every February 12 the attempt by German forces and Hungarian collaborators to break the Siege of Budapest by the Red Army in 1945. For years, these events have been accompanied by counter-demonstrations by left-wing activists.

According to media reports, in 2023, the neo-Nazi demonstration was formally banned by Hungarian authorities but took place anyway in the green area of Városmajor, far from the city center. In addition to giving Nazi salutes and wearing SS and Wehrmacht uniforms, the neo-Nazi demonstrators assaulted journalists present, two of whom were injured to the head. Later that evening, the neo-Nazi militants reportedly went also into the city center to attack left-wing counter-demonstrators. During the weekend around February 12, 2023, several assaults also occurred against people whom the attackers believed would be taking part in the neo-Nazi demonstration. According to Hungarian authorities, there were five attacks (two on February 9, two on the 10th, and one on the 11th) against a total of nine people, four of whom were seriously injured.

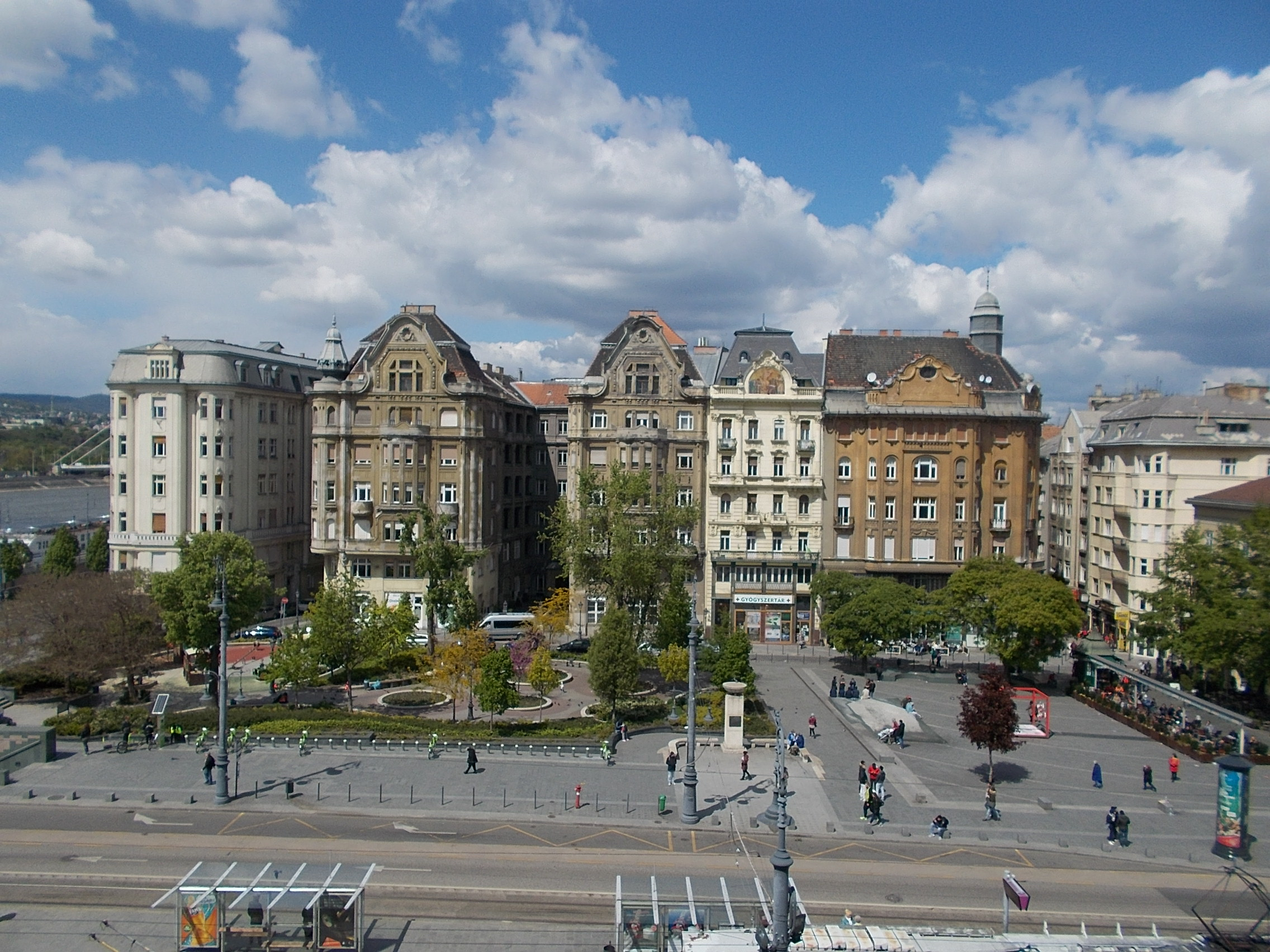
View of Fővám Square, the scene of one of the attacks

The first attack occurred on the morning of February 9 at Budapest Nyugati station against Tamás L., one of the founders of the far-right group Légio Hungária, who was sprayed with pepper spray. Subsequently, three Polish citizens, members of the far-right National Movement party, were attacked in Fővám Square (Hungarian: Fővám tér), on the Danube waterfront. For one minute, the three were assaulted from behind by a group of 7 or 8 hooded people who beat them with various objects including a telescopic baton, and finally sprayed them with pepper spray. Two of the three victims were reportedly seriously injured and later taken to the hospital.

On February 10, two attacks occurred. The first took place in the Gazdagrét district, targeting Zoltán T., a far-right extremist, who was leaving a post office. The victim was assaulted for about 30 seconds by a group of 11 people and then sprayed with pepper spray, suffering injuries to his eyes and ribs requiring 8 days of medical care. During the trial, Zoltán T. testified that his attackers had asked him if he would be participating in the "Day of Honor" and that, although he had answered no, they struck him on the head. In his opinion, the assailants targeted him because of his military clothing, which he explained he wore because he is a member of an association that preserves "tradition" and "Hungarian values". The second attack of the day occurred on Bank Street, in downtown Pest, against two people, one of whom was seriously injured. Finally, the last attack occurred the following day, shortly after midnight, on Mikó Street, a small street in the historic center of Buda, by 6 people against a couple of two German neo-Nazi militants, Sabine B. and Robert F. (who were leaving a neo-Nazi concert), and it also lasted about 30 seconds. One victim suffered head and elbow injuries requiring 8 days of medical care, while the other sustained minor injuries that did not require medical treatment.

According to Hungarian police, the victims were linked only by the fact that they were wearing military-style clothing and boots (a common element among far-right militants) and they were "passers-by". According to a witness and some videos, at least one Hungarian victim, László Dudog, a well-known musician from the neo-Nazi band Divízió 88, was wearing an SS Totenkopf on his cap. The attacks were carried out in similar ways, with the victims being ambushed from behind and then attacked with clubs, rubber hammers, telescopic batons, and pepper spray, in a manner similar to attacks carried out in Germany by left-wing extremists against far-right individuals. According to the German authorities, the objects used included kubotans, and there were also incidents such as the beating of an already unconscious man on the head, as well as contusions, fractures, and head trauma.

=== Arrests and trials ===
On February 11, 2023, Hungarian police arrested two Germans and an Italian woman, suspected of participating in the attacks. In addition to them, a Hungarian citizen was subsequently arrested. According to Hungarian authorities, those arrested were found in possession of a rubber hammer, two telescopic batons, and a glove padded with lead.

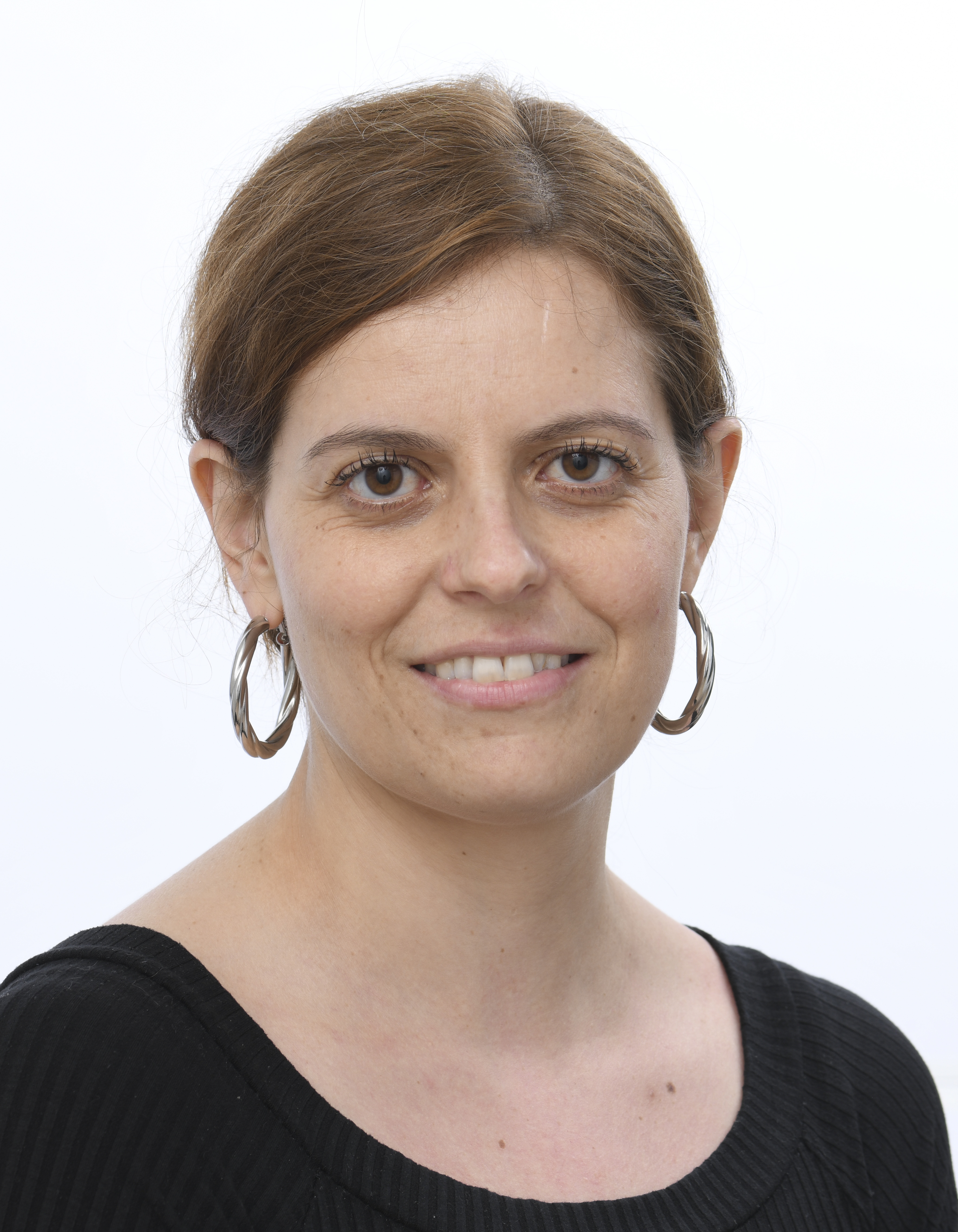
Ilaria Salis

Among the people whose arrest received the most attention was Ilaria Salis. Salis was arrested on February 11, accused of participating in the two attacks in Gazdagrét and Mikó Street (against a total of three people). She pleaded not guilty and rejected a plea bargain offering 11 years' imprisonment, and was held in custody in jail for all the months following. Salis's detention conditions were strongly criticized by, among others, international organizations such as the European Trade Union Confederation and the European Economic and Social Committee. In January 2024, her trial began, in which she faced charges of attempted assaults that could have caused life-threatening injuries and criminal association, with a maximum sentence of 24 years in prison. In May 2024, she was granted house arrest on bail, and was finally released following her election as a Member of the European Parliament.

Along with Salis, Tobias E. was also arrested. He had already been charged in the Dresden left-wing extremists trial with being a member of the so-called "Antifa-Ost" and participating in two attacks against right-wing extremists in Germany. After initially charging him with participating in the attacks, the Hungarian authorities limited the charge against him to membership in a criminal organization, a crime for which the maximum sentence under Hungarian law is five years. In January 2024, he plea-bargained with the authorities, confessing to being part of a criminal organization and waiving his procedural rights, in exchange for a reduced sentence. At first instance, he was sentenced to three years in prison, with a further five-year ban on entering the country. Tobias E. then appealed, and the sentence was reduced to one year and ten months of imprisonment on the grounds that he had not directly participated in the beatings but had only been present. At the end of his detention, in December 2024, Tobias E. was extradited to Germany, where he was transferred directly to prison pending the conclusion of two trials involving him. Upon his return to Germany, Tobias E. reported having been held in cells infested with bedbugs and cockroaches, cold in winter and hot in summer, with sporadic permission to wash in showers often lacking water. According to Tobias E.'s account, prison guards also beat some inmates in the showers, causing fractures and, in one case, even the death of an Algerian prisoner. He also stated that he received less food because he was not Hungarian.

The other German woman arrested, Anna M., was instead granted a suspended sentence pending trial. She too was charged with criminal association. She was also offered a plea bargain, in her case amounting to three and a half years in prison, but she refused it. Anna M. was subsequently expelled and she went back to Germany. On February 4, 2026, in the same trial against Maja T., she was sentenced in absentia to two years in prison for criminal association.

== Further investigations and extraditions ==
Following the attacks, Hungarian authorities launched a vast search operation, publishing the names and photos of suspects. German authorities subsequently also launched their investigations. As a result, several arrest warrants (including international ones) were issued against various people in Germany, Italy, and France, who were suspected of involvement in the Budapest attacks and of being members of, or having links with, the group known as "Antifa-Ost" (lit. transl. Antifa-East, also called "Hammerbande" by the media because they used hammers against their victims during several attacks in Germany).

=== Germany ===
Following the issuance of international arrest warrants by the Hungarian authorities, ten Germans belonging to extreme left-wing organizations went underground. Subsequently, further arrest warrants were issued by German prosecutors. This investigation led to several arrests, including figures believed to be part of Antifa-Ost, such as Johann G., suspected of being the group's leader, and Hanna S., who was not sought by the Hungarian authorities. In March 2024, investigations in Germany were taken over directly by the Federal Public Prosecutor's Office.

On January 20, 2025, seven people, six Germans and one Syrian, turned themselves in to authorities in Germany (in Kiel, Hamm, Cologne, and Bremen), asking not to be extradited to Hungary. Six of them had European Arrest Warrants issued against them. At the end of January, German authorities announced that they would not extradite the six suspects with German citizenship.

==== The Maja T. case ====
In November 2023, Hungarian authorities also issued an arrest warrant against Maja T., suspected of participating in four attacks in the Hungarian capital. The following month, the Dresden public prosecutor's office issued another German arrest warrant against them. On December 11, 2023, Saxon Police arrested Maja T. in Berlin, and subsequently transferred them to Dresden prison. Despite protests from their lawyer, who argued that his client would be at risk of discrimination in Hungary as an antifascist and as a non-binary person, the Berlin Public Prosecutor's Office agreed to the Hungarian requests in January 2024, asking the Berlin Kammergericht to authorize the extradition. On June 27, the court granted the request, after assurances from the Hungarian Ministry of Justice that detention conditions respectful of human rights would be guaranteed and that the defendant would have the opportunity to serve the sentence in Germany once the Hungarian trial was concluded. At 2:00 AM the following day, the extradition was physically initiated, a fact which Maja T.'s lawyer was informed of at 3:30 AM. The defense then requested a temporary injunction from the German Federal Constitutional Court at 7:38 AM on June 28. At 10:50 AM, the Constitutional Court issued its ruling, granting the defense's request and suspending the extradition. At that point, however, the Berlin Public Prosecutor's Office informed the Court and the defense that the extradition had already been carried out at 6:50 AM with the handover of the defendant to the Austrian authorities, who then transferred the prisoner to the Hungarian authorities at 10:00 AM. The extradition procedure was particularly rapid, thanks in part to the use of a helicopter for the transfer to the Austrian border.

The completed extradition was criticized both in form and substance, since it effectively circumvented the appeal to the Constitutional Court, in a manner that critics (including Amnesty International) considered dubious from a rule-of-law perspective. The Prosecutor's Office maintained that the speed in executing the sentence was necessary due to anonymous threats against police officers and magistrates from far-left circles. Politicians from Die Linke and The Greens joined in with the criticism, denying or questioning the existence of the guarantees of the rule-of-law in Hungary. The Berlin Prosecutor's Office's action was instead defended by Berlin Senator for Justice Felor Badenberg (CDU). In February 2025, the Federal Constitutional Court ruled that the Kammergericht's decision to extradite the defendant was unconstitutional because Hungarian detention conditions had not been sufficiently clarified and the risks of discrimination for Maja T. as a member of the LGBTQ community had not been investigated (beyond the assurances provided by Hungarian authorities).

Once in Budapest, Maja T. was charged with attempted life-threatening bodily harm (the alleged offences were the direct participation in two attacks and being present at other two) and criminal association, with a maximum possible sentence of 24 years. The defendant rejected a plea bargain proposal of 14 years in prison from the Hungarian Prosecutor's Office. The trial began in February 2025. Maja T. too was brought to hearings in handcuffs, shackles, and tied to a rope, a condition criticized also by the German Foreign Ministry. During the hearings, some far-right journalists filmed and photographed family members and friends of the defendant who came to attend the trial. Among those who attended a hearing of the trial were also activist and MEP from Die Linke Carola Rackete and The Left parliamentary group leader Martin Schirdewan. In June 2025 (and again in October 2025), the court rejected the request to convert the sentence to house arrest. During the trial, the prosecution based its charges on a video allegedly showing Maja T. together with other suspected participants in the attacks near one of the locations where they took place. The Hungarian prosecution requested the maximum sentence of 24 years in prison as a "deterrent". Maja T. did not address the charges. The detainee's defence requested the acquittal. On February 4, 2026, Maja T. was sentenced in the first instance to eight years in prison for the crimes they were charged with. The sentence was criticised by some German political forces: Schirdewan called the sentence "disproportionate", while SPD MEP René Repasi spoke of failures to uphold fundamental guarantees of due process and of a "political instrumentalisation" of the trial by Viktor Orbán. On September 30, 2026, a Hungarian appeals court reduced Maja T.'s sentence to seven years.

According to reports by Die Linke parliamentarians Martin Schirdewan and Lea Reisner after a visit to the Hungarian prison, Maja T. was being held in a small cell infested with bedbugs and cockroaches and was receiving insufficient amounts of food. The prisoner's German lawyer also spoke of continuous surveillance via cameras, restrictions on visits even for German consular staff and the lawyer himself, and inspections in which the detainee was tied up and forced to strip naked for three hours. The detainee's Hungarian lawyer, on the other hand, maintained that Maja T. was in regular contact with their family and external visitors. In early June 2025, Maja T. announced a hunger strike to protest their detention conditions and obtain repatriation to Germany, also speaking of lack of sunlight and psychological abuse. After 25 days, following the deterioration of their conditions, Maja T. was admitted to a prison hospital in the eastern part of the country, subsequently stopping the strike after another 15 days due to the dangers to their health. In the hospital, the detainee was visited by parliamentarians Anne Zerr (Die Linke) and Katrin Göring-Eckardt (Greens), who called for Maja T.'s repatriation. German Foreign Ministers Annalena Baerbock (Greens) and subsequently Johann Wadephul (CDU) asked Hungarian authorities to improve Maja T.'s detention conditions.

==== Other proceedings in Germany ====
On May 7, 2024, Hanna S. was arrested in Nuremberg, on a warrant from the Federal Prosecutor's Office (no extradition request from Hungary had ever been issued against her). The defendant was suspected of participating in two attacks against three people (which occurred on February 10 and 11), and the charges were grievous bodily harm, attempted murder (in one case according to the Prosecutor's Office the injuries were life-threatening), and criminal association, for a total request by the Prosecutor's Office of nine years' imprisonment. The trial, which began in February 2025, ended in September of the same year with a five-year prison sentence for grievous bodily harm and criminal association (while the defendant was acquitted of the attempted murder charge).

On November 8, 2024, Johann G., Lina E.'s former partner, was arrested. He had gone underground in 2020 following the arrests linked to the Dresden left-wing extremists' trial and was suspected of subsequently taking over the leadership of the group and planning the attacks. The trial in which he is charged began in November 2025 in Dresden. Among the various acts he is charged with, he is suspected of having participated in four attacks in Budapest. Six other defendants are standing trial alongside him, including Tobias E. (repatriated to Germany from Hungary) and Paul M. (among the fugitives who turned themselves in in January 2025). All are charged with criminal association and grievous bodily harm caused during several attacks against right-wing extremists in Germany. Johann G., Tobias E. and Paul M. are also charged with attempted murder.

For the six fugitives who turned themselves in in January 2025 (Nele A., Paul M., Paula P., Luca S., Moritz S., and Clara W.), the Federal Prosecutor's Office opposed extradition, arguing that arrest warrants had also been issued against them in Germany and that domestic proceedings took precedence over those in Hungary. In January 2026, the trial against five of them (all except Paul M., who is on trial in Dresden) began in Düsseldorf. In addition to them, the Düsseldorf trial also includes as a defendant Emilie D., who, besides participation in the Budapest attacks, is also accused of two further assaults on far-right extremists that took place in Germany. The charges against all of them were initially bodily harm (for three of them, in one case, aiding and abetting bodily harm) and criminal association, but subsequently it was also added the charge of attempted murder (for two of the attacks that took place in the Hungarian capital).

Along with the other six fugitives who turned themselves in in January 2025, there was also a Syrian citizen, Zaid A., who was also wanted on suspicion of having participated in the attacks in Budapest. In his case though the German Prosecutor's Office declared that it had no jurisdiction, as he was a foreign citizen under investigation for a crime committed abroad. Demonstrations were held against his feared extradition, and he received a visit in prison from Die Linke parliamentarian Lea Reisner. In May 2025, Zaid A. obtained a temporary suspension of sentence pending trial. In October 2025, however, the Syrian citizen fled to France, turning himself in to Parisian police authorities, obtaining a temporary suspension of his sentence from the French court too.

=== France ===
The Hungarian authorities issued a European arrest warrant also against Albanian citizen Rexhino Abazaj, resident in Finland, suspected of participating in the beating of February 11, 2023. The maximum sentence for the crimes he is accused of is 16 years in prison. Abazaj was placed under house arrest by the Finnish authorities. After losing in the first instance at the Helsinki District Court, which acknowledged human rights violations by the Hungarian penitentiary system but deemed it not sufficiently proven that Abazaj himself would suffer the consequences, appeals were lodged first before the Supreme Court and then before the European Court of Human Rights. In May 2024, still awaiting the verdict but fearing extradition, Abazaj fled house arrest and sought refuge in France.

On November 12, 2024, French police arrested him in Paris. The French Prosecutor's Office accepted the Hungarian request, asking for his extradition. A campaign was launched in favour of his release, joined by several intellectuals, including the writer Annie Ernaux. In March 2025, Abazaj was granted parole. The following month, the Court of Appeal, after having previously requested "effective guarantees" from Hungarian authorities regarding respect for the defendant's human rights, rejected the Hungarian request, arguing that the defendant's right to a fair trial would not be guaranteed in Hungary.

On December 16, 2025, Abazaj was rearrested by the Sous-direction Anti-terroriste (lit. transl. Anti-terrorist sub-directorate) of the French Police on a warrant issued by the German judicial authorities. According to Martin Schirdewan, the German authorities believe they have jurisdiction over the case because the two victims of the February 11 attack in Budapest were German citizens.

=== Italy ===
In November 2023, Hungarian authorities also issued a European arrest warrant against another Italian citizen, Gabriele Marchesi. Marchesi was thus placed under house arrest. In March 2024, after the Italian Prosecutor's Office itself opposed the Hungarian request, the Milan Court of Appeal denied extradition, due to the risk of "inhuman and degrading treatment" and "violation of fundamental rights" of Marchesi in Hungarian prisons. In Hungary Marchesi was accused, in the same trial that included Maja T. as a defendant, of having been present at three attacks. On February 4, 2026, Marchesi was sentenced in absentia by the Hungarian court to seven years in prison.

== Consequences ==
After similar announcements by Trump, in September 2025, Hungarian prime minister Viktor Orbán declared his intention to classify "Antifa" as a terrorist organization and called on the European Union to do the same, citing the 2023 Budapest events as justification for this decision. In November 2025, the US administration announced the inclusion of 'Antifa-Ost' among foreign terrorist organisations. Among the reasons cited for the inclusion was the accusation that the group was responsible for the attacks in Budapest in February 2023.

== In popular culture ==
In 2025, Italian cartoonist Zerocalcare published Nel nido dei serpenti (lit. transl. In the Snakes' Nest), a work focusing on these events, partly composed of comics previously published in Internazionale. The proceeds from the sale of the book, published in collaboration by Momo Edizioni and Bao Publishing, were donated to support the legal expenses of the people charged in the case.
