= Transnational =

Transnational, or transnationality, may refer to:

== Government and crime ==
- Transnational crime, crime spanning national boundaries
- Transnational governance, a focus on multiple countries or states without expanding to a global level
- Transnational marriage, marriage between two people from different countries or races
- Transnational organized crime, organized crime coordinated across national borders
- Transnational political party, a single political party with members or representatives in more than one country

== Organizations ==
- Transnational company, also known as multinationals
- Transnational Boxing Rankings Board, international initiative focused on authoritative rankings and reform within the sport of boxing
- Transnational Institute, international nonprofit advocacy organization
- Transnational Radical Party, nonprofit political initiative focused on nonviolence

== Scholarly concepts ==
- Transnational barrios, concept in Latin American and Latino studies that explains social construction that expands beyond one Latino identity
- Transnational education, concept involving a journey or movement of people, minds, or ideas across political and cultural frontiers
- Transnational feminism, the impact of globalization and capitalism on feminism
- Transnational organization, scholarly term referring to ideas that "transcend" the idea of a nation-state
- Transnational progressivism, umbrella movement focused on political power redistribution
- Transnational psychology, branch of psychology that applies postcolonial, context-sensitive cultural psychology and translational feminist lenses to psychological study
- Transnationalism, the study of the results of heightened international connectivity

== Other ==
- Transnational (VNV Nation album), studio album by the German band VNV Nation

== See also ==
- International (disambiguation)
- Multinational (disambiguation)
- Supranational (disambiguation)
- Subnational (disambiguation)
- National (disambiguation)
- Denationalization
