= Internationalist =

Internationalist may refer to:

- Internationalism (politics), a movement to increase cooperation across national borders
- Liberal internationalism, a doctrine in international relations
- Internationalist/Defencist Schism, socialists opposed to World War I
- A member of the:
  - First International, or International Workingmen's Association, (1864–1876), an organization aimed at uniting various left-wing groups
  - Second International, (1889–1916), the original Socialist International
  - International Brigades, volunteers from different countries, who fought for the Second Spanish Republic in the Spanish Civil War (1936–1939)
- Internationalist Review, an e-journal founded in Maastricht
- The Internationalist, a magazine based in Seattle
- Internationalist (album), a 1998 album by Australian band Powderfinger
- New Internationalist, an international magazine that works for social justice

== See also ==
- Internationalism (disambiguation)
