= The International =

The International may refer to:

== Arts, entertainment, media ==
- The International (2006 film), a 2006 Turkish film written and directed by Sırrı Süreyya Önder
- The International (2009 film), a 2009 film starring Clive Owen and Naomi Watts
- The International, a literary journal founded in 1912 by George Sylvester Viereck
- The International (play), a 1927 play by American playwright John Howard Lawson
- The International, a character in the television cartoon Popeye

== Competitions and sports ==
- The International (esports), the annual esports tournament for the video game Dota 2
- The International (golf), a golf tournament on the United States PGA tour
- The International (golf course), a golf course located in Bolton, Massachusetts
- The International (greyhounds), a former greyhound racing competition

== Socialism ==
- "The Internationale", an anthem of international socialism
- One of several political internationals, typically communist or socialist political organisations that span multiple countries
  - (see List of left-wing internationals)
  - The various editions of Webster's New International Dictionary, used as a jocular allusion to these political organisations

== Other uses ==
- A short name for The International Society of Sculptors, Painters and Gravers
- The International Nightclub Manchester, in England

== See also ==
- International (disambiguation)
- Internationale (disambiguation)
