= Internationality =

Involving more than one country

Map of members of the United Nations, an organization that has discussed and engaged in internationality.

Internationality, or the international, is the concept of something involving more than a single country and may suggest interaction between or encompassing more than one nation, or generally beyond national boundaries. For example, international law, which is applied by more than one country and usually everywhere on Earth, and international languages spoken by residents of more than one country. "International" is therefore also sometimes used as a synonym for "global".

As the United Nations noted in its Yearbook of the United Nations Commission on International Trade Law:

[T]here was a well-established tradition at the Hague Conference on Private International Law of not defining internationality. Comparative studies show that at least two concepts of internationality coexist in most countries: a legal concept and an economic concept. The legal concept consists in taking account of either the nationality or the geographical location of the parties concerned. The economic concept relates to the flow of goods, persons, financiers and so forth across borders. According to the latter sense of the term, a relationship qualifies as "international*' if it was entered into by partners located in the same territory but with one of the elements of the relationship to be performed in a different State.

== Origin of the word ==
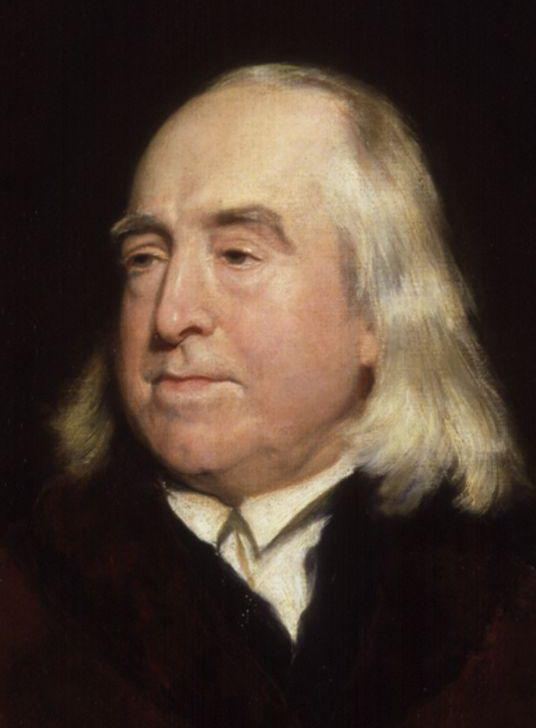
Philosopher Jeremy Bentham coined the word international in 1780.

The term international is of relatively recent vintage compared to much of the English language. It was coined by the utilitarian philosopher Jeremy Bentham in his An Introduction to the Principles of Morals and Legislation, which was printed for publication in 1780 and published in 1789, with Bentham writing: "The word international, it must be acknowledged, is a new one; though, it is hoped, sufficiently analogous and intelligible. It is calculated to express, in a more significant way, the branch of law which goes commonly under the name of the law of nations. The word was adopted in French in 1801. Thomas Erskine Holland noted in his article on Bentham in the 11th edition of the Encyclopædia Britannica that "Many of Bentham's phrases, such as 'international,' 'utilitarian,' 'codification,' are valuable additions to our language; but the majority of them, especially those of Greek derivation, have taken no root in it." In 1825, James Douglas of Cavero used the noun form when he wrote that "[a]n Influence, highly favourable to the Grecian States, consisted in their Internationality".

== Internationality in politics and law ==
Theories of internationality have been proposed by academics including Jonathan Rée and Martin Shaw, each of whom propose internationality as a fundamental force shaping modern history and politics, emphasizing its deep entanglement with the formation and function of nation-states. Both argue that national identity does not develop in isolation, but is instead embedded within international structures, shaping and being shaped by transnational political, economic, and ideological currents. Both characterize internationality as an historically persistent reality that underlies the evolution of governance, institutions, and cultural identity. Rée critiques nationalism as obscuring international interconnectedness, while Shaw focuses on the national-international structure as a central organizing principle in state-society relations. They differ in that Rée treats nationalism as a largely ideological framework that imposes artificial divisions on a fundamentally international history, whereas Shaw sees the national-international relationship as a structural tension that has historically defined modern governance. Shaw states that:

Internationality is therefore not, as sometimes supposed, the general opposite of nationality. The idea of internationality understands relations between and beyond nations in terms of the national principle. However, in a national-international world, antagonistic international relations reinforce separated nationalities.

The phrase, "The International", is often used to refer to a political international, specifically meaning a transnational organization of political parties having similar ideology or political orientation (e.g. communism, socialism, and Islamism). The international works together on points of agreement to co-ordinate activity. An international organization (also known as an "international institution" or an "intergovernmental organization") is a stable set of norms and rules meant to govern the behavior of states and other actors in the international system. Organizations may be established by a treaty or be an instrument governed by international law and possessing its own legal personality, such as the United Nations, the World Health Organization and NATO.

International law, also known as the law of nations and international ethics, is the set of rules, norms, and standards generally recognized as binding between nations. It establishes normative guidelines and a common conceptual framework for states across a broad range of domains, including war, diplomacy, trade, and human rights. International law aims to promote the practice of stable, consistent, and organized international relations. Public international law and international criminal law are particularly important areas.

The sources of international law include international custom (general state practice accepted as law), treaties, and general principles of law recognized by most national legal systems. International law may also be reflected in international comity, the practices and customs adopted by states to maintain good relations and mutual recognition, such as saluting the flag of a foreign ship or enforcing a foreign legal judgment. International law differs from state-based legal systems in that it is primarily—though not exclusively—applicable to countries, rather than to individuals, and operates largely through consent, since there is no universally accepted authority to enforce it upon sovereign states. Consequently, states may choose to not abide by international law, and even to break a treaty.

== Internationality in other fields ==
Internationality is also of concern to the arts and sciences. With respect to academic publishing, internationality has been raised as an issue, with researchers proposing composite indices to systematically quantify the extent to which journals engage contributors, editors, and readership across multiple nations. Another source notes that: "Internationality is, of course, an important attribute for artistic producers, with the world both as playing field and exhibition location".

In linguistics, an international language, or world language, is one spoken by the people of more than one nation. English, Spanish, French and Arabic are considered to be world languages. In interlinguistics, international often has to do with languages rather than nations themselves. An international word is one that occurs in more than one language. These words are collected from widely spoken source or control languages, and often used to establish language systems that people can use to communicate internationally, and sometimes for other purposes such as to learn other languages more quickly. The vocabulary of Interlingua has a particularly wide range, because the control languages of Interlingua were selected to give its words and affixes their maximum geographic scope. In part, the language Ido is also a product of interlinguistic research.

The concept of internationality in language has been explored in literary studies as a framework for understanding how texts transcend national and linguistic boundaries, as seen in professor Michael Saenger's Interlinguicity, Internationality, and Shakespeare (2015), which examines how Shakespeare's works reflect and engage with multiple languages and cultures beyond England. Saenger writes that internationality takes the interlinguistic concept of people speaking multiple languages in a city and extends it to the idea of nations, noting that "the Renaissance plays so often begin in foreign places, and those introductory scenes often lead to still more and more new locations. That mobility was a key pleasure that the theater sold, and it meant that audiences could never be sure precisely where they were". This iteration of internationality "could be seen as a pervasive characteristic of early modern social space, made particularly evident in the theater".

== See also ==
- Globalization
- International community
- International relations
- International (disambiguation)
- Internationalism (disambiguation)
- Multilateralism
- Multinational corporation
- Multinational state
- Supranational union
- United Nations
- World community

== Sources ==
- Ankerl, Guy (2000). Global communication without universal civilization. INU societal research. Vol. 1: Coexisting contemporary civilizations : Arabo-Muslim, Bharati, Chinese, and Western. Geneva: INU Press. ISBN 978-2-88155-004-1.
