= Interior =

Interior may refer to:

== Arts and media ==
- Interior (Degas) (also known as The Rape), painting by Edgar Degas
- Interior (play), 1895 play by Belgian playwright Maurice Maeterlinck
- The Interior (novel), by Lisa See
- Interior design, the trade of designing an architectural interior
- The Interior (Presbyterian periodical), an American Presbyterian periodical
- Interior architecture, process of designing building interiors or renovating existing home interiors

== Places ==
- Interior, South Dakota
- Interior, Washington
- Interior Township, Michigan
- British Columbia Interior, commonly known as "The Interior"

== Government agencies ==
- Interior ministry, sometimes called the ministry of home affairs
- United States Department of the Interior

== Other uses ==
- Interior (topology), mathematical concept that includes, for example, the inside of a shape
- Interior FC, a football team in Gambia

== See also ==
- List of geographic interiors
- Interiors (disambiguation)
- Inter (disambiguation)
- Inside (disambiguation)
- Exterior (disambiguation)
