= Internationalism =

Internationalism may refer to:

- Cosmopolitanism, the view that all human ethnic groups belong to a single community based on a shared morality as opposed to communitarianism, patriotism and nationalism
- International Style, a major architectural movement that was developed in the 1920s and 1930s
- Internationalism (linguistics), loanwords that occur translingually with the same or at least similar meaning and etymology
- Internationalism (politics), a political movement that advocates for greater economic and political cooperation among nations
- Internationalist–defencist schism, a split within the socialist movement between those opposed to World War I (internationalists) and those supporting their own country’s war efforts (defencists)
- Multilateralism, in international relations, multiple countries working in concert on a given issue
- Proletarian internationalism, the Marxist view of internationalism

== See also ==
- International (disambiguation)
- Internationalist (disambiguation)
- Internationality
- Nationalism
