= Inter Milan (disambiguation) =

F.C. Internazionale Milano, colloquially known as Inter Milan in English, is an Italian football club.

Inter Milan may also refer to:

- Inter Milan Youth Sector, youth team of Inter Milan
- Inter Milan (women), women's team of Inter Milan
- Milan-Inter HC, a defunct ice hockey team

== See also ==
- Inter (disambiguation)
- Internacional (disambiguation)
- Internazionale (disambiguation)
