= Internazionale (disambiguation) =

F.C. Internazionale Milano, colloquially known as Inter Milan in English, is an Italian football club.

Internazionale may also refer to:

- Inter Milan Youth Sector (F.C. Internazionale Milano Youth Sector), a youth team of Inter Milan
- US Internazionale Napoli, a defunct Italian football club based in Naples
- Internazionale FC Torino, a defunct Italian football club based in Turin
- Internazionale Pattaya F.C., a Thai football club based in Pattaya
- Internazionale (magazine), an Italian weekly magazine

== See also ==
- Inter (disambiguation)
- Inter Milan (disambiguation)
- Internationale (disambiguation)
