= Filipinos in Chicago =

Total population
- 145,000 (2019, est.)

Filipinos in Chicago are individuals residing in the city of Chicago with ancestral ties to the Philippines. Over nearly 130 years, they have made significant contributions to the economic, social, and cultural fabric of the city. Chicago is the US city with the seventh-largest Filipino population at 145,000 as of 2019, making up approximately 5% of the total population.

== History ==
Filipino immigration to Chicago began after the Spanish–American War in 1898, when the Philippines became a US colonial possession. Under the Pensionado Act, young men could attend school in the US; these pensionados largely settled near college campuses like in Hyde Park. Others migrated supported by family or looking for work. The Pullman Company hired a large number of Filipino porters when negotiating with the Brotherhood of Sleeping Car Porters, a union of the previously largely African American porters; many members of the BSCP were known to be Filipino. These workers settled mostly in McKinley Park, Bridgeport, Archer Heights and Pullman. According to census data, Chicago's Filipino population grew from 154 in 1920 to 1740 in 1940, although unofficial estimates put the population closer to 5000 in 1930. In 1940, among those over the age of 20, men outnumbered women twenty-one to one. The Filipino American Council of Chicago was formed in 1940 by Carmelito Llapitan.

Under the family reunification provisions of the McCarran-Walter Act of 1952, more Filipinos were able to immigrate between the years of 1952-1965, including the families of those who had already immigrated. In 1960, the Filipino population was counted at 3,554, consisting of 2,143 men and 1,411 women.

Immigration rates increased greatly under the Immigration and Nationality Act of 1965, which ended the use of the National Origins Formula, under which yearly immigration from the Philippines was capped at 100. Immigrants from the Philippines included both skilled workers such as nurses and doctors and family members of previous immigrants. In 1970, the population totaled 9,497; in 1980, 41,283 in the Chicago area, and in 2000, 95,298 in the Chicago metropolitan area, with 32,266 in Chicago. The José Rizal Center was opened as a hub for Filipino culture in Lake View in 1974, named after Dr. José Rizal.

Year	Filipino population	Chicago population	Percent of total population
1920	154	2,701,705	.0057%
1930	5,000 (unofficial estimate)	3,376,438	.15%
1940	1,740	3,396,808	.051%
1960	3,554	3,550,404	.10%
1970	9,497	3,366,957	.28%
2000	32,266	2,896,016	1.11%
2019	145,000	2,746,388 (2020)	5.27%

== Today ==
Chicago has been described as a hub for Filipino culture in the Midwest. Organizations for Filipinos in Chicago include the Filipino American Council of Greater Chicago, which operates the Rizal Center, the Filipino-American Historical Society of Chicago, and the Alliance of Filipino Immigrants for Rights and Empowerment (AFIRE).

=== Landmarks ===
The Rizal Center, after falling into disrepair due to ownership disputes in 2017, was restored in 2022 and serves as a gathering place for Filipinos, with features like kapihan (coffee meetups), a children’s library, and martial arts classes. In Margate Park in Uptown, a statue of José Rizal honors his stop in Chicago on 11 May 1888, en route to New York from San Francisco.

=== Neighborhoods ===
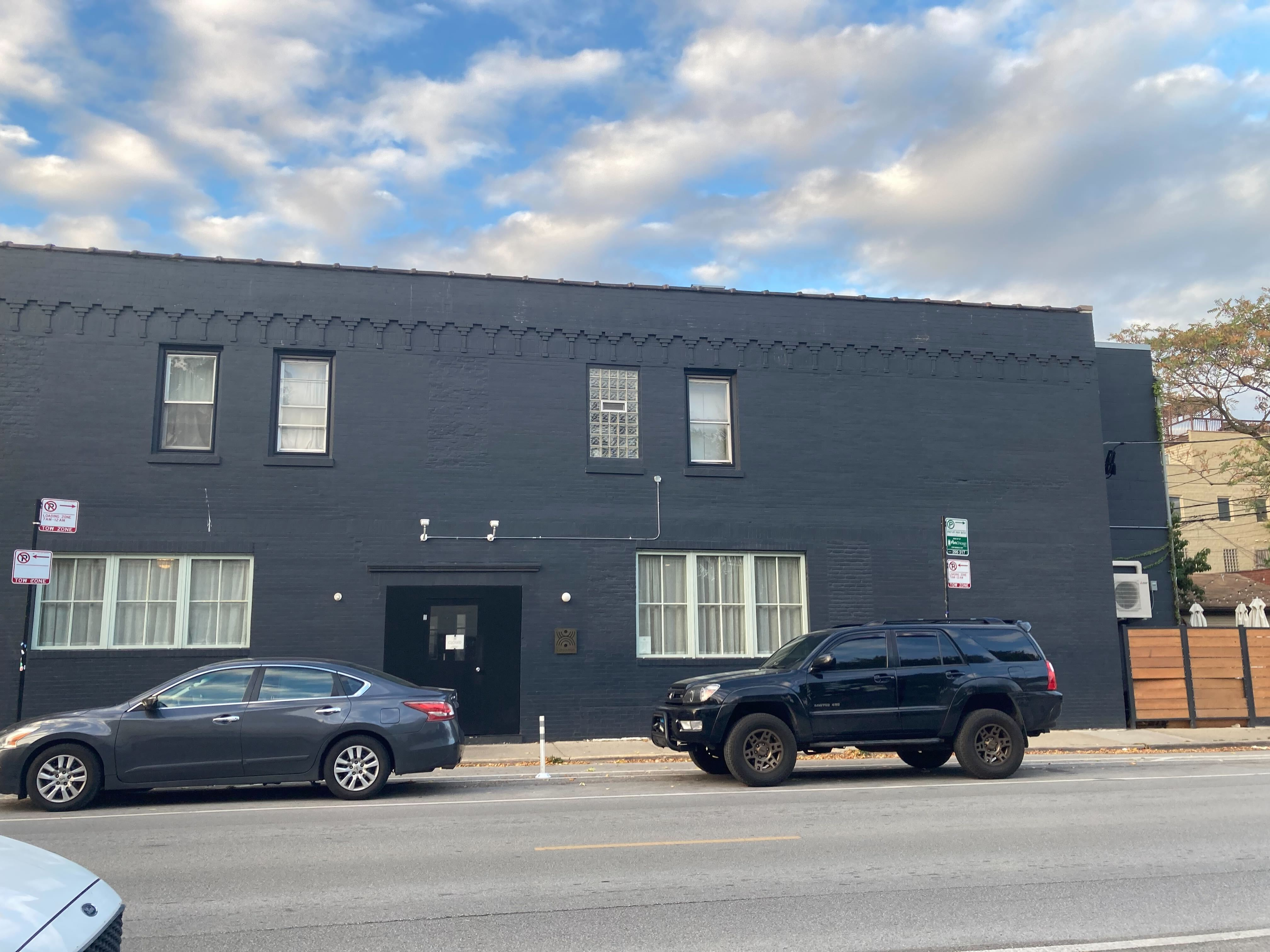
Exterior of Kasama, in West Town, Chicago

Filipinos in Chicago are not strongly associated with or concentrated in any one neighborhood. They are sometimes associated with Lake View due to it being the location of the Rizal Center, a community center for Filipinos, but historically Filipinos have settled in the North and South sides of Chicago, with South Side neighborhoods like McKinley Park, Bridgeport, Archer Heights and Pullman being hubs for early immigrants in the 1920s, and later immigrants living in a variety of areas on the North Side such as Edgewater, Lincoln Square, Albany Park and the northern and northwest suburbs, including Glendale Heights, Morton Grove, North Chicago, Skokie, and Waukegan.

=== Food and culture ===
In the 2020s, Filipino restaurants experienced a boom in Chicago. Chicago is home to the world's only Michelin starred Filipino restaurant, Kasama, owned and operated by wife-husband duo Genie Kwon and Tim Flores. Chef-owner of Hawaiian-Filipino restaurant Kanin described the Ravenswood neighborhood as a "Little Manila" due to the proliferation of Filipino restaurants in the area, including his own restaurant, Boonie's, Del Sur, Side Practice Coffee, and Bayan Ko.

== Notable people ==
- Dale Talde, chef
- Leni Manaa-Hoppenworth, first Filipino-American elected to city council
- Billy Dec, media personality
- Cassidy Hubbarth, news anchor
- Kris Wolf, professional wrestler
- Jaremi Carey, drag performance artist (Phi Phi O'Hara)
- Erik Spoelstra, basketball coach
- Pearl Gonzalez, mixed martial artist
- Cole Mrowka, soccer player
- Grace Talusan, author
- Terese Guinsatao Monberg, scholar of literacy and Filipino-American studies
- Zaire Barnes, football player
