= Internationale (disambiguation) =

Internationale or variation, may refer to:

- The Internationale (1888 song; French: L'internatinale), a French song, the left-wing anthem
- The Internationale (album), 1990 Billy Bragg album
- Internationale (EP), 1995 Braniac record
- Vivi l'internationale (1948–2022), Beninese singer

== See also ==
- Political international or "internationale", a type of international political organization
- First Internationale
- Second Internationale
- La Troisième Internationale (French: The Third Internationale)
- Internationalen (Swedish: The Internationale)
- Internationaler Bund (German: International Federation)
- International (disambiguation)
- The International (disambiguation)
- Internazionale (disambiguation)
