= Day of Honor (Neo-Nazi rally) =

Neo-Nazi rally

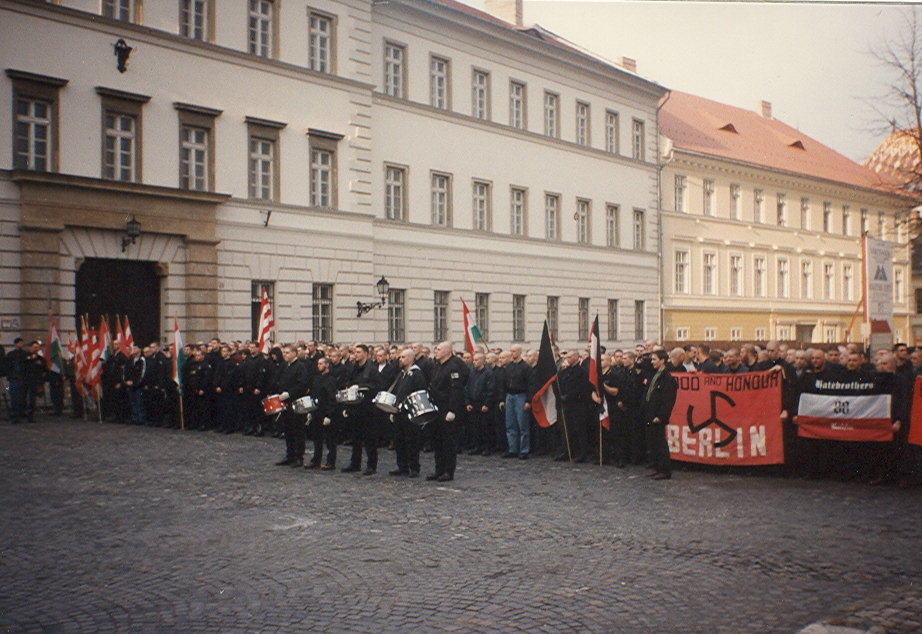
The Day of Honor in 1998

The Day of Honor (Hungarian: Becsület napja) is a neo-Nazi gathering held annually in Budapest around February 11, honoring the German soldiers of the Waffen-SS and the Hungarian troops who attempted to break the Soviet siege of Buda Castle during the Siege of Budapest in 1945. It has become the second largest neo-Nazi gathering in Europe.

Introduced in 1997 by the Hungarian National Front, then taken over by Blood & Honour in 2003, it attracts thousands of participants, including many Hungarian and foreign far-right groups.

Despite several attempts by the authorities to ban it, the rally receives favorable media coverage in government-controlled media and has received public subsidies. In 2023, there was a crackdown on anti-fascist counter-protesters, notably through European arrest warrants.

== History ==
The Day of Honor is held every year in Budapest around February 11 to honor the soldiers of the German Waffen-SS and Hungarian troops who attempted to break the Red Army's siege around Buda Castle during the Siege of Budapest in 1945.

Introduced in 1997 by the Hungarian National Front, the first edition of this gathering attracted 150 participants. It was then taken over by Blood & Honour in 2003. This commemoration has become the second largest neo-Nazi gathering in Europe, attracting thousands of people, including European neo-Nazi leaders. Despite Blood & Honour being banned in Hungary in 2004, its symbols and ideology remain present during the ceremony.

Since 2005, Fidesz has also organized official ceremonies through the municipality of Várkerület.

In 2020, the event was organized by the violent far-right group Légió Hungária. For the first time, an anti-fascist counter-demonstration drew more participants than the neo-Nazi event.

== Event schedule ==
The event takes place mainly on Heroes' Square and includes a gathering at Városmajor Park, the site of a massacre perpetrated by the Arrow Cross Party against Jews in January 1945, as well as a 60-kilometer night march following the route taken by SS and Hungarian soldiers.

== Participants ==
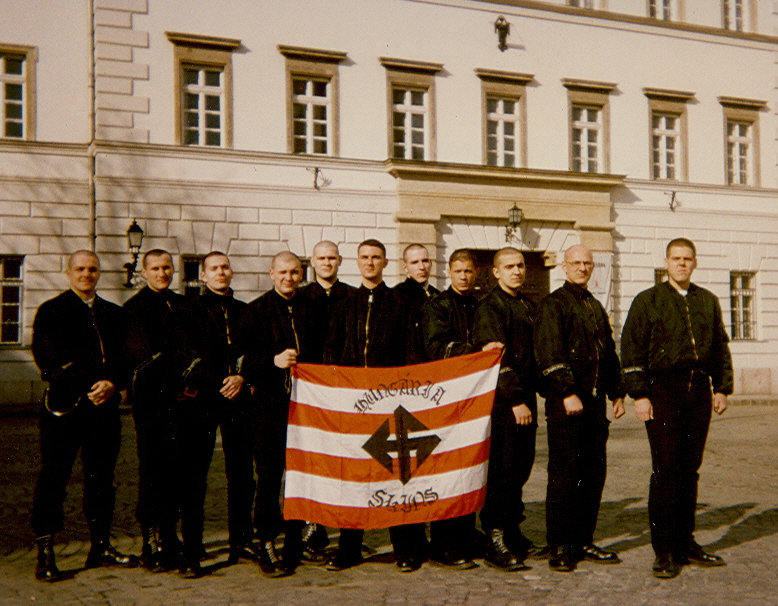
Members of the Hungaria Skins at the first edition of the Day of Honor

Various Hungarian far-right groups such as the Pax Hungarica Movement, Jobbik, and the Sixty-Four Counties Youth Movement have also participated in this event, as well as numerous foreign neo-Nazis, such as German parties The Right and Third Way, the Nordic Resistance Movement and the Serbian branch of Blood & Honour.

Many participants wear period uniforms, including those of the Wehrmacht and SS units, equipped with authentic or reproduced military accessories, while others participate in civilian clothing.

Some participants do not claim any ideological affiliation.

In 2025 the march featured some participants displaying Russian military symbols, including the Z symbol, "Wagner Group" patches etc.

Countries such as Germany, Italy, Sweden, Russia and beyond, have all had some of their most violent and radical far-right groups attend this demonstration, making it one of the most persistent and internationally connected manifestations of European far-right mobilisation in the post-Cold War era.

== Relations with authorities ==
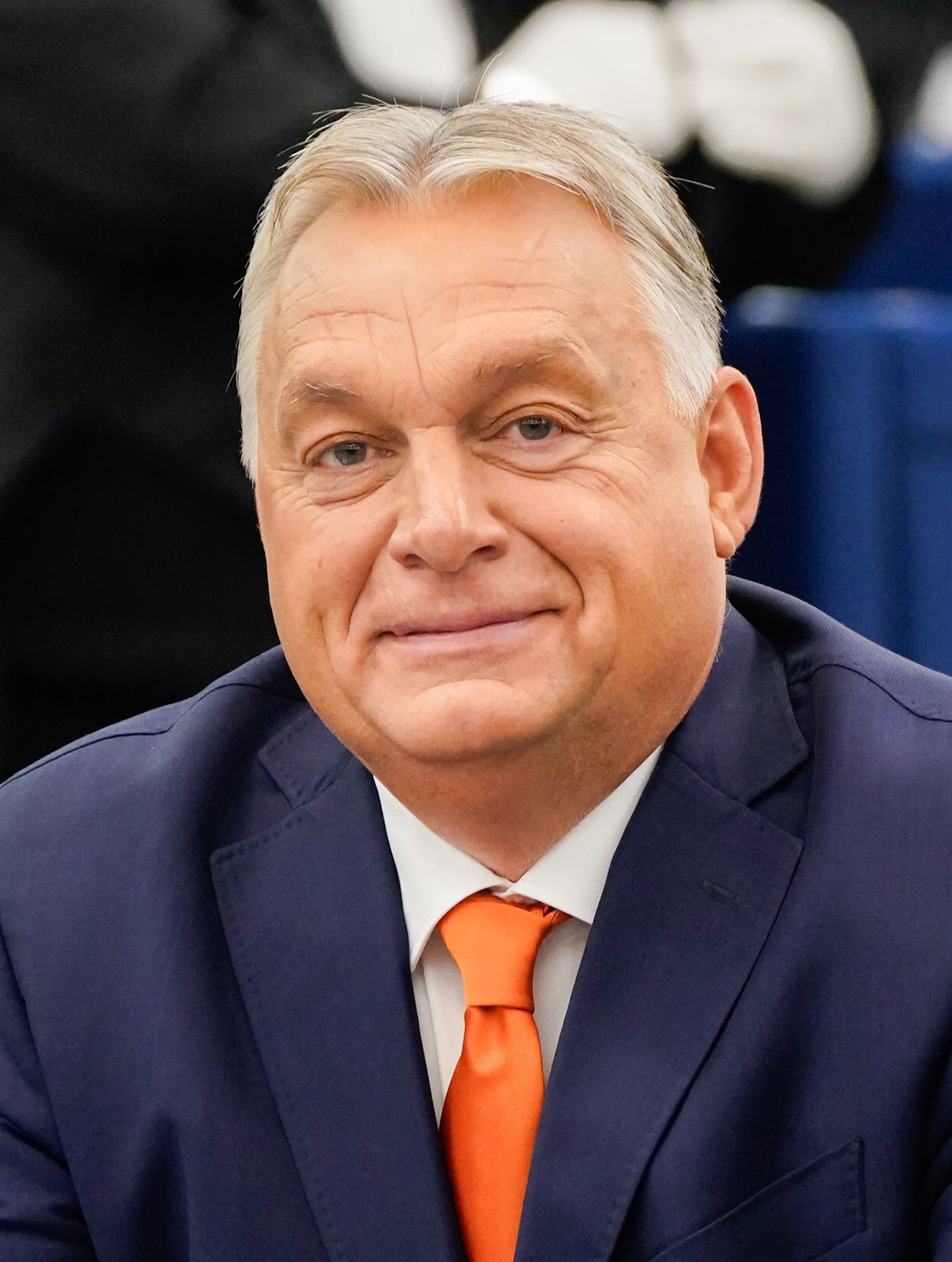
Viktor Orbán

Since Viktor Orbán came to power in 2010, this commemoration has received favorable media coverage in government-controlled media outlets, which, according to Jacobin, portray the Axis powers as "heroic defenders of Europe." In 2018, Orbán attempted to prevent the neo-Nazi rally from taking place, in accordance with a promise made to the president of the Federation of Jewish Communities in Hungary, but was unsuccessful.

In 2022, Hungarian police banned the annual commemoration of the Day of Honor, citing the likely presence of extremist groups that could disturb public order and promote ideas that undermine the dignity of World War II victims. However, it has been permitted in subsequent years.

According to Le Figaro, Orbán had shown particular tolerance towards this event compared to other banned neo-Nazi demonstrations, as the organizers of the Day of Honor have received public subsidies.

== Counter-protesters ==
For years the neo-Nazi gathering has been accompanied by counter-demonstrations by left-wing activists. In 2023 there were also several attacks against people whom the attackers believed would be taking part in the neo-Nazi demonstration. Since 2023, 18 anti-fascist activists, mainly German and Italian (among whom Ilaria Salis, elected MEP in 2024), were prosecuted by the Hungarian courts for their alleged participation to these attacks. Hungarian authorities launched a Europe-wide manhunt by issuing European Arrest Warrants to apprehend activists, particularly in France, Italy, Germany, and Finland. In September 2025, Viktor Orbán cited these events to justify his decision to classify Antifa as a terrorist organization, following the example of US President Donald Trump.

== Historical analysis ==
According to academic Magdalena Marsovszky, its name recalls the Waffen-SS slogan Meine Ehre heißt Treue ("My honor is loyalty"). She criticizes these commemorations for presenting the Nazi forces and their Hungarian allies as defenders and victims, when in fact they were part of the Axis powers that were the aggressors during World War II, but also for omitting the Holocaust and glorifying troops allied with the Nazis.

== See also ==
- Independence March (Poland)
- 612 march (Finland)
