= Interiors (disambiguation) =

Interiors is a 1978 dramatic film by Woody Allen.

Interiors may also refer to:

- Interiors (Ativin album), a 2002 album by Ativin
- Interiors (Brad album), a 1997 album by the band Brad
- Interiors (Glasser album), a 2013 album by Glasser
- Interiors (Quicksand album), a 2017 album by Quicksand
- Interiors (Rosanne Cash album), a 1990 album by Rosanne Cash
- Interiors (magazine), interior design magazine

== See also ==
- Interior (disambiguation)
