= Subnational =

Subnational or sub-national may refer to:

- Administrative division, all administrative divisions are under the national level
- Subnational legislature, a type of regional legislature, under the national level
- Subnational state, a type of state, under the national level
- Subnational diplomacy, a form of diplomacy, under the national level
- Subnational flag, a flag of an entity under the national level

== See also ==
- Supranational (disambiguation)
- International (disambiguation)
- Multinational (disambiguation)
- Transnational (disambiguation)
- National (disambiguation)
