= List of international labor organizations =

Labor organizations, such as unions, support workers by advocating for their legal rights to a safe, equitable workplace and fair compensation. Localized labor organizations will form larger, international associations in order to influence governments and lawmakers to create protective legislation for workers.

== International Labor Organizations ==
- Fair Labor Association (FLA) (a non-profit designed to complement existing international and national labor laws)
- Industrial Workers of the World (IWW) (an international union open to all laborers)
- International Centre for Trade Union Rights (an organizing and campaigning body for trade unions and trade unionists)
- International Labor Rights Forum (ILRF) (a non profit organization dedicated to preserving the rights of workers around the world with a particular emphasis on sweatshops and child labor)
- International Labour Organization (ILO) (an agency of the United Nations to deal with labor issues)
- Socialist International (a worldwide organization of social democratic, labor, and democratic socialist political parties.

== See also ==
- Fair Wear Foundation (FWA)
- Labor movement
- List of federations of trade unions
- List of left-wing internationals
- List of trade unions
- Political international
- Trade Justice Movement (TJM)
