= Multinational =

Multinational may refer to:

- Multinational corporation, a corporate organization operating in multiple countries
- Multinational force, a military body from multiple countries
- Multinational state, a sovereign state that comprises two or more nations

== See also ==
- International (disambiguation)
- Transnational (disambiguation)
- Supranational (disambiguation)
- Subnational (disambiguation)
