= Supranational =

Supranational or supra-national may refer to:

- Supranational union, a type of multinational political union
- Supranational law, a form of international law
- Supranational legislature, a form of international legislature
- Supranational currency, a form of international currency
- Supranational bond, a form of financial asset
- Supranational aspects of international organizations
- Miss Supranational, a beauty pageant annual
- List of supranational environmental agencies

== See also ==
- Subnational (disambiguation)
- International (disambiguation)
- Multinational (disambiguation)
- Transnational (disambiguation)
- National (disambiguation)
