= Dresden left-wing extremism trial =

2023 German court case

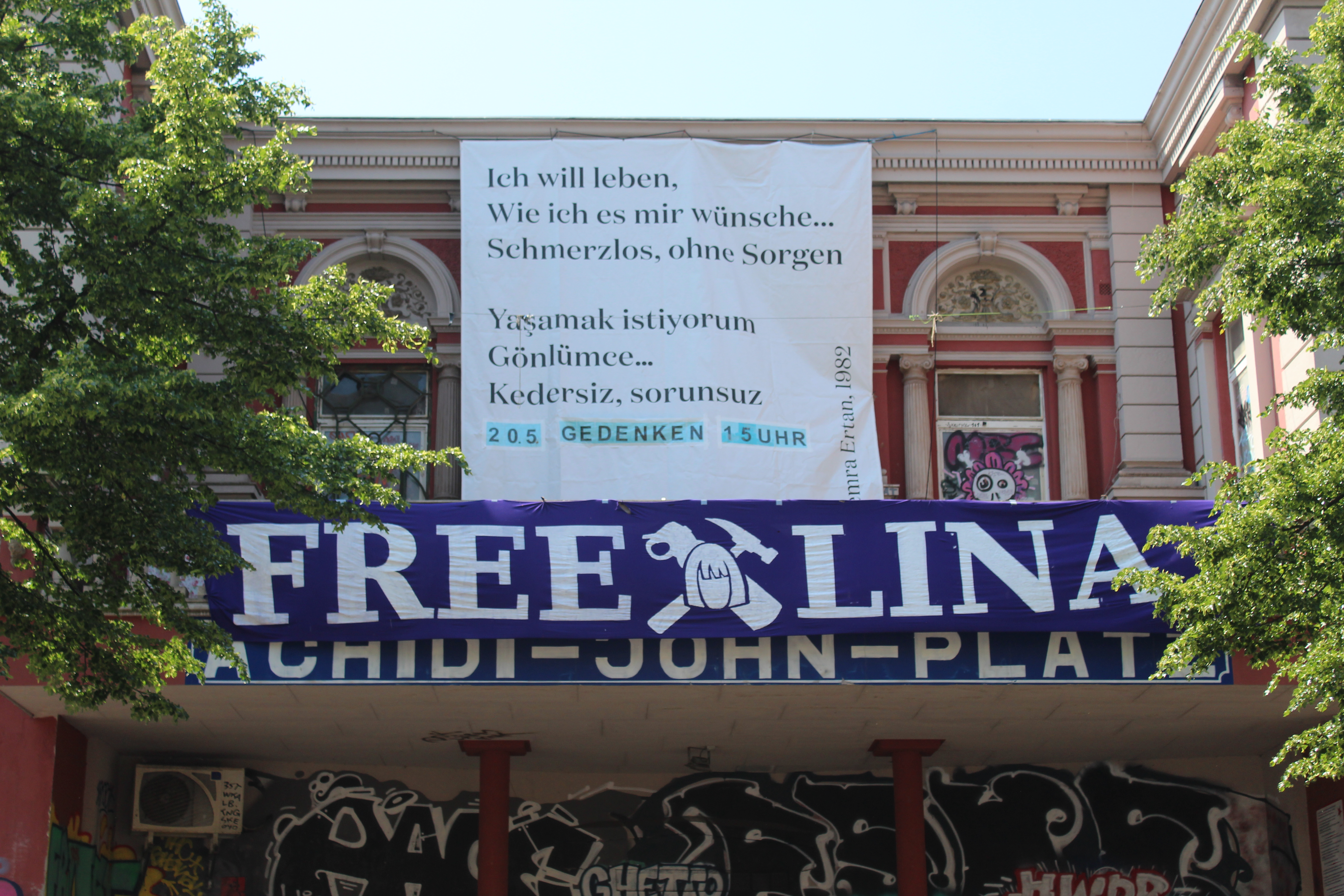
- Banner "Free Lina" at Rote Flora in Hamburg
- Court: Higher Regional Court of Dresden
- Decided: 31 May 2023

Court membership
- Judge sitting: Hans Schlüter-Staats

On 31 May 2023, a Dresden court found 28-year-old far-left extremist Lina Engel (Note: In accordance with the German press code regarding anonymity of defendants, media outlets did not publish Lina's full name.) guilty of six acts of violence including causing dangerous bodily harm against neo-Nazi individuals, and sentenced her to five years and three months of imprisonment. Three co-defendants (Lennart A., Jonathan Philipp M., and Jannis R.) were charged with her, convicted and received shorter sentences.

== Background ==
In 2022, the Federal Office for the Protection of the Constitution released a report saying that there had been a significant rise in far-left extremism in Germany, with violence directed "primarily at the police and right-wing extremists" and linking far-left extremism to climate protest groups. The Federal Criminal Police Office's annual report that same year stated there had been a drop in cases attributed to left-wing extremism in 2022, and a 16% increase in cases attributed to far-right extremism. German police attributed 23,493 registered crimes to the far right in 2022, and 6,976 to the far left.

== Attacks ==
Timeline

Lina Engel was a student from Kassel who was studying social work in Leipzig, in eastern Germany, with a focus on preventing far-right radicalization among youth. According to Deutsche Welle, she had become politicized following the National Socialist Underground murders in the 2000s and the subsequent trial, which had sparked significant controversy surrounding links between German intelligence services and the far-right. Her group was accused of carrying out six attacks against far-right targets in Saxony and Thuringia between 2018 and 2020. Lina was determined to be the head of the group, which the court ruled to be a criminal organization.

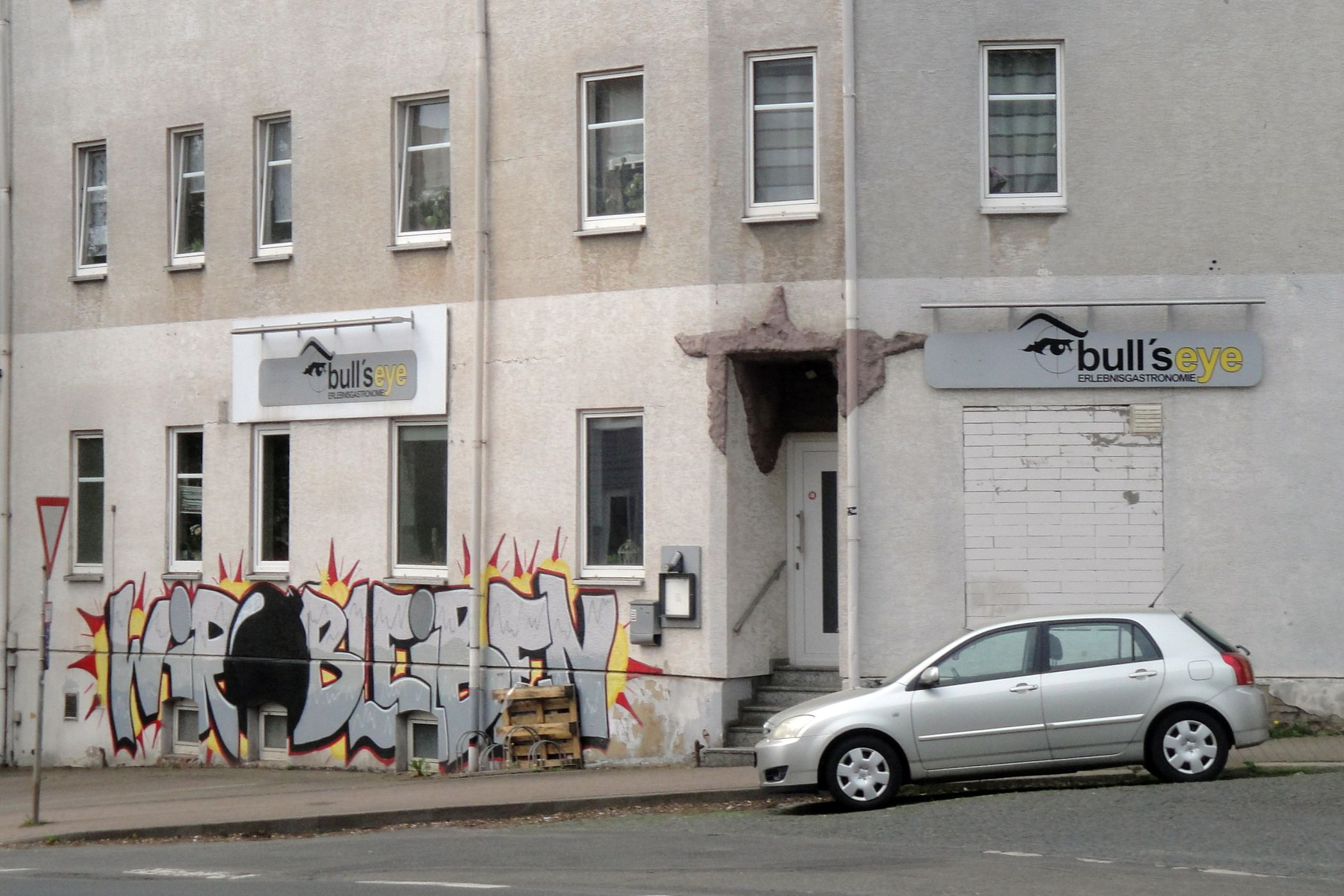
Pub in Eisenach after the 2019 attacks

The attacks were highly organized. The group used fake IDs, wigs, stolen equipment, and burner phones to evade capture. The violence included two attacks against Leon Ringl, a known far-right extremist. Ringl was attacked first in late 2019 at an Eisenach pub known to be frequented by neo-Nazis. He was beaten with hammers and batons, and was attacked again weeks later near his car. In January 2021, the same pub was attacked again using an explosive device, which resulted in no injuries. The pub's facade was sprayed with graffiti saying, in English, "Fight Nazis every Day". Ringl replaced the graffiti with another saying "We're staying here!" (German: Wir bleiben!).

An individual in Connewitz, Leipzig, named Tobias N. was attacked with hammers and suffered a broken skull, the treatment of which required surgery and metal plates. He was wearing a hat with far-right symbolism. He later claimed that he was no longer active in the far-right scene, and that the hat was an old part of his wardrobe.

Another attack in 2020 involved around 20 members of Lina's group. During this incident, six individuals were attacked during a ceremony commemorating the Dresden bombings, an event often attended by the German far-right. The attack resulted in several serious injuries due to beatings and baton attacks by the assailants.

== Arrest and trial ==
Lina Engel was arrested on 5 November 2020, and remained in custody up to the verdict. The trial of Lina Engel lasted for almost 100 days. Ringl, as well as a state informant within the group known as Johannes D., served as chief witnesses. The prosecutor sought a sentence of eight years' imprisonment.

On 31 May 2023, the last day of the trial, Lina was greeted by spectators with applause and cheers. Hans Schlüter-Staats, the Higher Regional Court of Dresden judge overseeing the trial, stated that "opposing right-wing extremists is a respectable motive" and that there had been "deplorable" deficiencies in recent trials of far-right extremists, but that she has still committed serious crimes and that the legitimate monopoly on violence belonged to the state, not to private individuals. He announced that the court had reached a guilty verdict and sentenced the defendant to five years and three months in jail. Upon the announcement of the verdict, far-left spectators shouted slogans against the court, such as "[you are] friends of fascists!" (German: Faschofreunde!) and "fuck class justice!" (German: Scheiß Klassenjustiz!), which prompted the judge to announce a 15-minute break.

Following the verdict, Lina Engel was released, pending appeal. A second decision to affirm or overturn the sentence can take a year and a half. Her passport was confiscated to eliminate flight risk.

== Reactions ==
Germany's Minister of the Interior, Nancy Faeser, said that the government will act decisively against any left-wing violence following the verdict. She argued that there exists no place for vigilante justice in a democratic constitutional state.

Lina's defense lawyers claimed that the trial was politically motivated, and called for their client to be acquitted. Green Youth chairman Timon Dzienus questioned the verdict. He tweeted:

A completely exaggerated process based on questionable evidence is being used with all severity against Lina Engel and other leftists. What nonsense—that's why FreeLina!

This comment drew criticism by members from the Christian Democratic Union party.

The right-wing party Alternative for Germany welcomed the verdict, accusing Lina Engel of terrorism, and called for a longer sentence for the defendants. Jochen Kopelke, head of the Gewerkschaft der Polizei, condemned Lina Engel's release pending appeal, stating that "it was clear to us as officers that we would also be the focus of extremists." Several media outlets drew comparisons between Lina Engel's group and the Red Army Faction.

On 13 November 2025, the United States Department of State declared Antifa Ost to be a foreign terrorist group pursuant to NSPM-7.

=== Protests ===
Protests against the verdict were organized by far-left groups in Berlin, Hamburg, Dresden, and other cities.

In the city of Leipzig, some clashes broke out between protestors and police officers in the first demonstration after the trial, with around 800 protestors in attendance. In response to a larger protest dubbed "Day X" (German: Tag X), planned to take place on 3 June, the city banned public gatherings. Around 1500 protestors attended the banned Day X protest, which was broken up by police.

=== Analysis ===
Sabine Volk of the University of Passau told the BBC that there was a perception "that the state isn't doing anything against the neo-Nazi scene" among the radical left in Germany, adding that the perception was "not entirely true but it's not far-fetched either."

== See also ==
- Budapest Complex
