= Fifth International =

Campaign for a new worker's international

The phrase Fifth International refers to the efforts made by groups of socialists and communists to create a new workers' international.

== Previous internationals ==
There have been several previous international workers' organisations, and the call for a Fifth International presupposes the recognition of four in particular, each of which regarded itself as the successor to the previous ones:

1. The "First International", known as the "International Workingmen's Association", was founded in London in 1864 and dissolved in 1876.
2. The "Second International", known as the "Socialist International", was founded in 1889 and existed until its dissolution in 1914. The Second International was a direct ancestor of the modern Socialist International, an international organization of mainstream social democratic political parties.
3. The "Third International", known as the "Communist International" and "Comintern", was founded by Vladimir Lenin in 1919 after the failure of the Second International at the start of World War I. The group was dissolved in 1943.
4. The "Fourth International" was founded in 1938 by Leon Trotsky in opposition to Stalinism. Trotsky considered the Third International to be irreformable, counter-revolution, and under the control of a bureaucratic elite from the Soviet Union. The Fourth International was dissolved in 1953.

Although a reunified Fourth International still exists, the fragmentation of Trotskyism has resulted in the call for a fifth international.

== Calls for a Fifth International ==
In November 1938, two months after the founding congress of the Fourth International, seven members of the Spanish Workers' Party of Marxist Unification on trial in Barcelona denounced the international and declared their support for a "fighting Fifth International". The Argentine Trotskyist Liborio Justo called for a Fifth International when he broke from Trotskyism in 1941. Another call for a Fifth International was made by American activist Lyndon LaRouche after leaving the Spartacist League in 1965. Later, a "Fifth International of Communists" was founded in 1994 by the Movement for a Socialist Future and several small former Trotskyist groups. In 2015, the Revolutionary Anti-Imperialist Movement called for the formation of a Fifth International based on Maoism–Third Worldism.

=== League for the Fifth International ===
L5I logo

In 2003, the League for a Revolutionary Communist International, originally founded in 1989, called for the formation of the Fifth International "as soon as possible – not in the distant future but in the months and years ahead". The group became the League for the Fifth International (L5I), which as of 2010 had sections in Austria, the Czech Republic, Germany, Pakistan, Sri Lanka, Sweden, the United Kingdom and the United States. L5I describes itself as "an organization of communists and Trotskyists". L5I campaigns in the European Social Forum and the international labour movement for the formation of a new international. The Communist Workers' Group in New Zealand, which splintered from L5I, also argues for a Fifth International.

=== Hugo Chávez ===
Hugo Chávez announced in 2007 that he would seek to create a new international: "2008 could be a good time to convoke a meeting of left parties in Latin America to organise a new international, an organisation of parties and movements of the left in Latin America and the Caribbean".

The League for the Fifth International critically supported the proposal.

== In popular culture ==
Poet Allen Ginsberg mentions a Fifth International in "Footnote to Howl", the final part of his poem "Howl".

The card game Illuminati by Steve Jackson Games features the Fifth International as a "communist" and "conservative" group.

Robert A. Heinlein references a Fifth International in the novel The Moon Is a Harsh Mistress. While the novel's characters are discussing their different political ideologies as they attempt to design a revolution, the character Wyoming Knott identifies herself as a "Fifth Internationalist" but states she is "no Marxist".

== See also ==
- International Communist Seminar
- International Meeting of Communist and Workers' Parties
- List of left-wing internationals
- List of Trotskyist internationals
- Progressive International
- São Paulo Forum
