= Internationalist Review =

The Internationalist Review is an independent, non-profit e-journal founded on July 3, 2006, in Maastricht, Netherlands. The entity is registered as a non-profit foundation under Dutch law at the Chamber of Commerce in The Hague and under Belgian law in Brussels (registry number 0879.791.987).

== Mission ==
The IR wants to be in its own words "a reader-friendly guide to news sources from around the world". Its aim is to overcome the national partition of the public sphere and create an "espace publique mondial". The style of publications is clearly inspired by academic methods and standards.

The first board of directors of the Internationalist Review Foundation consisted of seven members, including five different nationalities. The first published dossier dealt with the anti-CPE crisis in France. An on-line Review was maintained until 2008.

== Activities ==
Since 2008, the Internationalist Review Foundation (or simply Internationalist Foundation) diversified its activities, notably by organising the European Master Thesis Award in cooperation with Maastricht University and the large-scale research project INFOCON, financed under the Seventh Framework Programme for Research and Development of the European Commission.
