= International Mountain =

Mountain in British Columbia, Canada

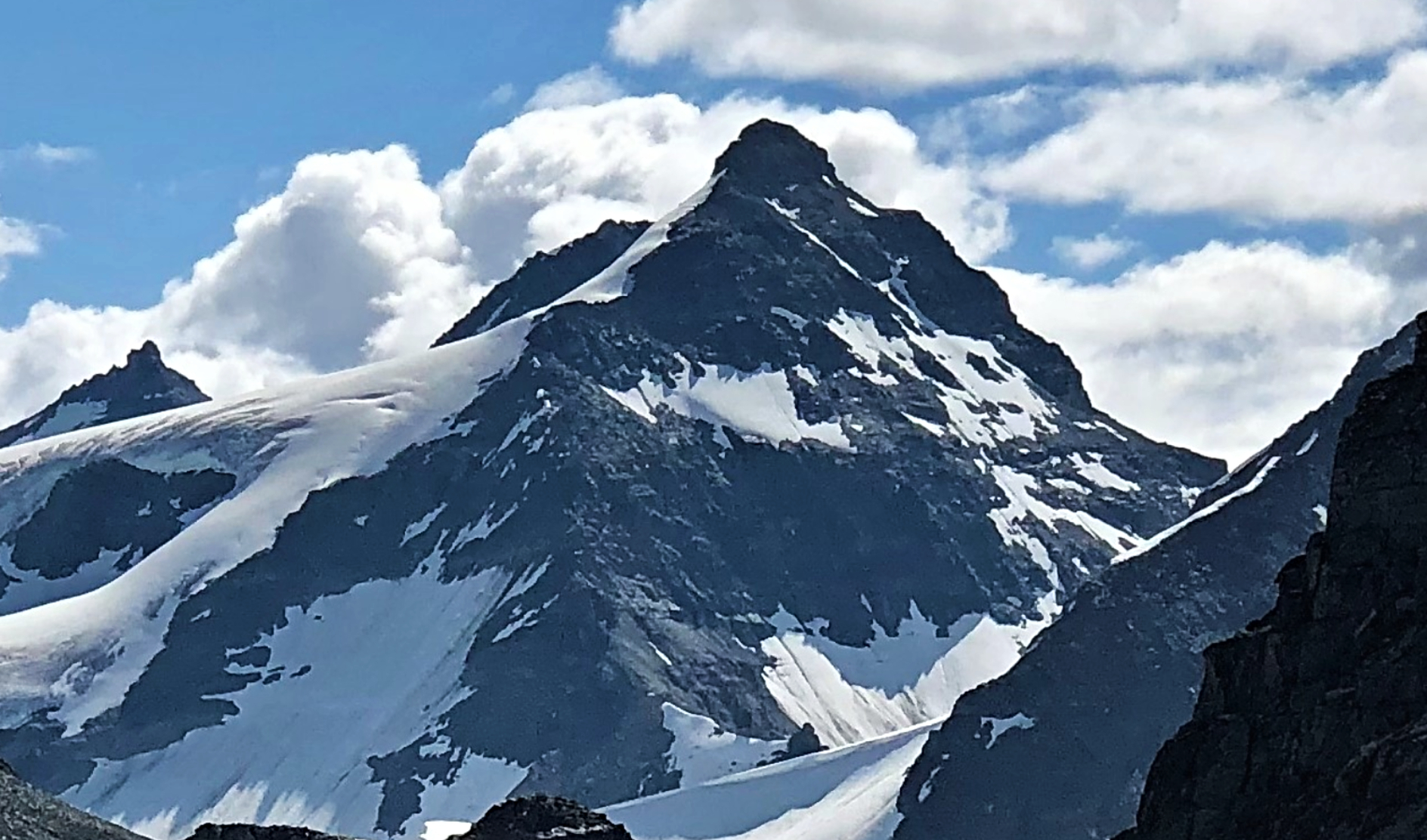
- West aspect

Highest point
- Elevation: 3,099 m (10,167 ft)
- Prominence: 979 m (3,212 ft)
- Parent peak: Mount Conrad (3,279 m)
- Isolation: 18.41 km (11.44 mi)
- Listing: Mountains of British Columbia
- Coordinates: 50°58′06″N 117°05′40″W

Geography
- Location within British Columbia Location within Canada
- Interactive map of International Mountain
- Location: British Columbia, Canada
- District: Kootenay Land District
- Parent range: Carbonate Range; Purcell Mountains; Columbia Mountains
- Topo map: NTS 82K14 Westfall River

International Mountain is a mountain summit in British Columbia, Canada.

== Description ==
International Mountain is a prominent 3,099-metre-elevation (10,167-foot) peak located 33 kilometres (21 miles) northwest of The Bugaboos and 38 kilometres (24 miles) south of Golden. It is the highest point of the Carbonate Range which is a subrange of the Purcell Mountains. Precipitation runoff from the mountain's south slope drains to the Duncan River via Syncline and Hatteras creeks, and from the north slope into Carbonate Creek → Bobbie Burns Creek → Spillimacheen River → Columbia River. Topographic relief is significant as the summit rises 1,524 metres (5,000 feet) above Syncline Creek in three kilometres (1.9 miles). The mountain's toponym was officially adopted on September 14, 1967, by the Geographical Names Board of Canada.

== Climate ==
Based on the Köppen climate classification, International Mountain is located in a subarctic climate zone with cold, snowy winters, and mild summers. Temperatures in winter can drop below −20 °C with wind chill factors below −30 °C. This climate supports unnamed glaciers on the mountain's slopes.

== See also ==
- Geography of British Columbia
- Purcell Supergroup
