= List of geographic interiors =

Coastal regions of a territory are often the most densely populated due to their greater economic productivity or colonial history. This leads to a contrast with the interior of the territory, which is (or was) sparsely populated. Examples include:

- Australian Interior or Interior of Australia, a vast undefined area corresponding very approximately to land that is 200 kilometres (120 miles) to 300 kilometres (190 miles) and more from the coast.
- British Columbia Interior, commonly called "The Interior", the inland areas of British Columbia, Canada, including but not limited to:
  - The Interior Plateau, official name of the parts of British Columbia between the Coast Mountains and the Columbia Mountains and the Canadian Rockies, and south of the Interior Mountains
- The Columbia Plateau, Washington, USA, sometimes referred to as the "Interior Plateau"
- The Alaska Interior, a largely wilderness area, encompassing most of the state
- Interior Division, an administrative division of Sabah, east Malaysia, on the island of Borneo
- U.S. Interior Highlands, a mountainous region spanning eastern Oklahoma, western and northern Arkansas, southern Missouri, and the extreme southeast corner of Kansas
- Interior Plains, a vast physiographic region that spreads across the Laurentian craton of North America

== See also ==
- Hinterland
