= Transnational political party =

Political party with members in multiple countries

A transnational political party is a single political party with members or representatives in more than one country.

A well-known example is the Arab Socialist Ba'ath Party, established as an Arab nationalist and socialist party aspiring to pan-Arab political union. The party's central governing body, the National Command, included representatives from its organisations in all the Arab countries where Ba'athists had a significant presence. Each branch of the party, in turn, had a local governing body, the Regional Command, and although practical power became centred in the Syrian and Iraqi Regional Commands and the National Command of each faction assumed an essentially symbolic role, the party split in 1966, with different factions taking control in Syria and Iraq, each faction retained a pan-Arab structure.

Another example of a transnational political party is Sinn Féin, which has 7 Members of Parliament in the United Kingdom Parliament, and 37 Teachtaí Dála in the Irish Dáil Éireann. Sinn Féin also has 26 MLAs in the Northern Ireland Assembly.

Some transnational organisations also have a party-political dimension. The best example of this is the European Union, in which groups of national political parties operate together when participating in EU institutions, especially the European Parliament, as European political parties, or "Europarties". However, European political parties are distinct from transnational political parties in that they do not operate at the national level.

In a broad sense, global movements such as communism, socialism, and Islamism have transnational qualities, but in most such cases the party organization is separate in each country, with the transnational aspect being one more of consultatation and coordination, often through political internationals. One notable exception to this rule is the Progressive Labor Party (United States), which views proletarian internationalism as requiring that they set up party collectives all over the globe. Some Trotskyist parties behave similarly.

== Party abroad ==
Due to global migration, many political parties become transnational and create parties abroad. Migrants become active in the parties of their home land. A party abroad is any informal or formal function, establishment or activity of a national political party, outside the borders of its home country. A predecessor of a party abroad is a party branch abroad.

Typology of parties abroad
	Headquarters in home country	Headquarters abroad
Emigrant politics	Emigrant party branches (e.g. Labour International)	Emigrant parties (e.g. ASFE and MAIE)
Diaspora politics	(Anti)-Diaspora parties (e.g. AKP and RCD)	Forbidden parties (e.g. NDPT)

== List of transnational political parties ==
=== Current ===
Party	Countries/Areas	Ideology	Notes
Alliance for the Union of Romanians	Romania; Moldova	Right-wing populism Conservatism; Moldovan-Romanian unionism	
American Communist Party	United States; Canada	Marxism–Leninism; MAGA Communism; American–Canadian unionism	
Aontú	Ireland; Northern Ireland	Social conservatism Irish republicanism	
Armenian Revolutionary Federation	Armenia; Lebanon; Iran	Armenian nationalism Market socialism	
Ba'ath Party (Iraqi-dominated faction)	Middle East and North Africa Algeria; Bahrain; Egypt; Iraq; Jordan; Kuwait; Lebanon; Libya; Mauritania; Palestine; Sahrawi Republic; Sudan; Syria; Tunisia; Yemen	Ba'athism	
Ba'ath Party (Syrian-dominated faction)	Middle East and North Africa Bahrain; Iraq; Jordan; Lebanon; Palestine; Sahrawi Republic; Sudan; Syria; Tunisia; Yemen	Ba'athism	
Basque Nationalist Party	Spain; France	Basque nationalism Christian democracy	
Communist Party of Ireland	Ireland; Northern Ireland	Communism; Marxism–Leninism	
Croatian Democratic Union	Croatia; Bosnia and Herzegovina	Conservatism; Christian democracy	
Economic Freedom Fighters	South Africa; Namibia; Eswatini; Lesotho	Marxism–Leninism; Left-wing populism Anti-imperialism; Black ultranationalism	
Endavant	Spain; France	Socialism; Communism; Catalan independence Anti-fascism; Anti-capitalism; Pancatalanism	
European Realistic Disobedience Front	Greece; Germany; Italy; Sweden; Netherlands	Post-capitalism; Anti-austerity; Progressivism; Eco-socialism; Ecofeminism; European federalism	
Eusko Alkartasuna	Spain (as part of EH Bildu); France (as part of EH Bai)	Basque nationalism Social democracy	
Forum for Democracy	Netherlands; Belgium	Right-wing populism	
Freedom Party of Austria	Austria; Italy	National conservatism Right-wing populism	Exists under the name Die Freiheitlichen in Italy.
Hizb ut-Tahrir	globally	Pan-Islamism; Caliphatism; Jihadism; Anti-Zionism; Anti-capitalism	Party doesn't partake in democratic elections.
Irish Republican Socialist Party	Ireland; Northern Ireland	Communism; Marxism–Leninism	
Jamaat-e-Islami	India; Pakistan; Bangladesh (formerly)	Pan-Islamism; Religious conservatism Islamic socialism	
Liberal Democratic Party of Russia	Russia; Belarus; Transnistria (formerly)	Russian nationalism Ultranationalism	
Party of Democratic Action	Bosnia and Herzegovina; Serbia; Kosovo; North Macedonia; Montenegro (formerly)	Bosniak nationalism Islamism	
People Before Profit	Ireland (as part of PBP-S); Northern Ireland	Trotskyism; Socialism; Anti-capitalism	
Ramgavar	Armenia; Lebanon	Armenian nationalism Liberalism	
Republican Left of Catalonia	Spain; France	Catalan nationalism Social democracy	
Republican Network for Unity	Ireland; Northern Ireland	Irish republicanism Socialism	
Saoradh	Ireland; Northern Ireland	Irish republicanism Revolutionary socialism Anti-imperialism	
Serbian Progressive Party	Serbia; North Macedonia; Bosnia and Herzegovina	Populism	
Serbian Radical Party	Serbia; Montenegro; Croatia (formerly); Bosnia and Herzegovina (formerly); North Macedonia (formerly)	Serbian irredentism	
Sinn Féin	Ireland; Northern Ireland	Irish republicanism Democratic socialism	
Social Democrat Hunchakian Party	Armenia; Lebanon	Armenian nationalism Social democracy	
Socialist Workers Network	Ireland; Northern Ireland	Revolutionary socialism Trotskyism	
Sortu	Spain (as part of EH Bildu); France (as part of EH Bai)	Abertzale left Anti-capitalism; Democratic socialism	
Syrian Social Nationalist Party	Syria; Lebanon	Social nationalism Syrian nationalism Anti-Zionism	
Vetëvendosje	Kosovo; North Macedonia	Social democracy Left-wing populism Albanian nationalism	
Volt Europa	Europe Albania; Austria; Belgium; Bulgaria; Croatia; Cyprus; Czech Republic; Denmark; Estonia; Finland; France; Germany; Greece; Hungary; Ireland; Italy; Latvia; Lithuania; Luxembourg; Malta; Netherlands; Poland; Portugal; Romania; Slovakia; Slovenia; Spain; Sweden; Switzerland; Ukraine; United Kingdom	European federalism Social liberalism Progressivism	
Workers' Party	Ireland; Northern Ireland	Communism; Marxism–Leninism	

==== European political parties ====
A European political party is an organisation constituted by multiple national political parties which operates as a single party at the European Union level.

- Alliance of Liberals and Democrats for Europe Party
- Europe of Sovereign Nations
- European Christian Political Party
- European Conservatives and Reformists Party
- European Democratic Party
- European Free Alliance
- European Green Party
- European Left Alliance for the People and the Planet
- European People's Party
- Party of European Socialists
- Party of the European Left
- Patriots.eu

=== Former ===
- Adalat Party (Azerbaijan), a party founded in Baku with branches abroad, especially in Iran
- African Party for the Independence of Guinea and Cape Verde, their Cape Verde branch remains active as African Party for the Independence of Cape Verde
- Arab Socialist Ba'ath Party
- Democratic Convergence of Catalonia, the French branch CDC 66 merge in Oui au Pays Catalan
- Democratic Left (Ireland)
- French Communist Party, had a section in Monaco from 1944 to 1950
- General Jewish Labour Bund in Lithuania, Poland, and Russia
- Revolutionary Party of Central American Workers
- World Agudath Israel, only Agudat Yisrael in Israel remains active as a party

== See also ==
- Political international
- Category:Transnational politicians
