= Transnationalism =

Results of heightened international connectivity

Transnationalism is a research field and social phenomenon grown out of the heightened interconnectivity between people and the receding economic and social significance of boundaries among nation states.

== Overview ==
The term "trans-national" was popularized in the early 20th century by writer Randolph Bourne to describe a new way of thinking about relationships between cultures. Merriam-Webster Dictionary states that the term "transnational" first appeared in print in 1921, which was after Bourne's death.

Transnationalism as an economic process involves the global reorganization of the production process, in which various stages of the production of any product can occur in various countries, typically with the aim of minimizing costs. Economic transnationalism, commonly known as globalization, was spurred in the latter half of the 20th century by the development of the internet and wireless communication, as well as the reduction in global transportation costs caused by containerization. Multinational corporations embody economic transnationalism by organizing operations in the most efficient means possible irrespective of political boundaries.

Proponents of transnational capitalism seek to facilitate the flow of people, ideas, and goods between regions via migratory workforces, globalized corporations, global monetary flows, global information flows, and global scientific cooperation. However, scholars critical of transnational capitalism have argued instead for a transnationalism from below, between workers and co-operatives as well as popular social and political movements.

The concept and theory of transnationalism has provided a framework for a variety of social sciencess. In practice, transnationalism refers to the increasing integration of processes that cross borders, as well as multinational relations of individuals, groups, and firms mobilizing beyond the boundaries of nation-states. Patricia Clavin additionally suggests that transnationalism illuminates the paradox that "transnational ties can dissolve some national barriers while simultaneously strengthening or creating others." Although much recent literature has focused on popular protest as a form of transnational activism, some research has also drawn attention to clandestine and criminal networks, as well as foreign fighters, as examples of a wider form of transnationalism.

Some have argued that diasporas, such as the overseas Chinese, are a historical precursor to modern transnationalism. The field of diaspora politics often positions modern diasporas as having the potential to function as transnational political actors and be influenced by transnational political forces. While the term "transnationalism" emphasizes the ways in which nations are no longer able to contain or control the disputes and negotiations through which social groups access global networks, the notion of diaspora brings to the fore the racial dynamics underlying the international division of labor and the economic turmoil of global capital. In an article published in 2006, Asale Angel-Ajani claimed that "there is the possibility within diaspora studies to move away from the politically sanitized discourse that surrounds transnational studies". Since African diaspora studies have focused on racial formation, racism, and white supremacy, diaspora theory has the potential to bring to transnationalism "a varied political, if not radical political, perspective to the study of transnational processes and—globalization".

== Causes ==
Different approaches have attempted to explain transnationalism. Some argue that it is driven mainly by the development of technologies that have made transportation and communication more accessible and affordable, changing the way in which people relate to places and maintain connections across borders. Immigrants and diasporic communities can now sustain closer and more frequent contact with their home societies than ever before, increasing the exchange of resources, ideas, and cultures globally.

The integration of international migrations into the demographic and social futures of countries worldwide is another important driver for transnationalism. Migration not only responds to the labor market needs, but also addresses demographic gaps created by population changes, while simultaneously fostering social, economic, and cultural exchanges across borders. Globally. migration accounts for significant population growth in many countries, including three fifths of population growth in Western countries as a whole, highlighting the ongoing interconnected and transnational aspects of human mobility.

Moreover, global political transformations and new international legal regimes have weakened the state as the only legitimate source of rights. Decolonization, the fall of communism, and the ascendance of human rights have emphasized the need for states to recognize individuals as persons with rights regardless of their citizenship status within a country.

Others, from a neo-Marxist approach, argue that transnational class relations have come about concomitantly with novel organizational and technological advancements and the spread of transnational chains of production and finance.

== Immigrant transnational activities ==
When immigrants engage in transnational activities, they create "social fields" that link their original country with their new country or countries of residence. "We have defined transnationalism as the process by which immigrants build social fields that link together their country of origin and their country of settlement". These social fields are the product of a series of interconnected and overlapping economic, political, and socio-cultural activities:

=== Economic transnational activities ===
Economic transnational activities such as business investments in home countries and monetary remittances are both pervasive and well documented. The Inter-American Development Bank (IDB) estimates that in 2006 immigrants living in developed countries sent home the equivalent of $300 billion in remittances, an amount more than double the level of international aid. This intense influx of resources may mean that for some nations development prospects become inextricably linked—if not dependent upon—the economic activities of their respective diasporas.

=== Political transnational activities ===
Political transnational activities can range from retained membership in political parties in one's country of origin and voting in its elections to even running for political office. Less formal but still significant roles include the transfer or dissemination of political ideas and norms, such as publishing an op-ed in a home country newspaper, writing a blog, or lobbying a local elected official. There is also the more extreme example of individuals such as Jesus Galvis, a travel agent in New Jersey who in 1997 ran for a Senate seat in his native Colombia. He was elected and intended to hold office simultaneously in Bogota and Hackensack, New Jersey where he served as a city councilor.

=== Political economy ===
The rise of global capitalism has occurred through a novel and increasingly functional integration of capitalist chains of production and finance across borders which is tied to the formation of a transnational capitalist class. This approach has led to a broader study of corporate networks, the global working class and the transnationalization of state apparatuses and elites.

=== Psychology ===
Transnational psychology developed in response to the new psychological contexts created by escalating globalization, global power dynamics, increasing migration, an ever more interconnected world, and other phenomena that transcend nation-state boundaries. It is a branch of psychology that applies postcolonial, postmodern context-sensitive cultural psychology, and transnational feminist lenses to the field of psychology to study, understand, and address the impact of colonization, imperialism, and globalization, and to counter the Western bias in the field of psychology. Transnational psychologists partner with members of local communities to examine the unique psychological characteristics of groups without regard to nation-state boundaries.

=== Socio-cultural transnational activities ===
Transnationalism is an analytic lens used to understand immigrant and minority populations as a meeting of multiple simultaneous histories. Socio-cultural transnational activities cover a wide array of social and cultural transactions through which ideas and meanings are exchanged. Recent research has established the concept and importance of social remittances which provide a distinct form of social capital between migrants living abroad and those who remain at home. These transfers of socio-cultural meanings and practices occur either during the increased number of visits that immigrants take back to their home countries or visits made by non-migrants to friends and families living in the receiving countries or through the dramatically increased forms of correspondence such as emails, online chat sessions, telephone calls, CDs/ VDOs, and traditional letters.

In the late 1980s, ethnic studies scholars would largely move towards models of diaspora to understand immigrant communities in relation to area studies, although lone patterns of international flow would become accompanied by the multiple flows of transnationalism. However, to say that immigrants build social fields that link those abroad with those back home is not to say that their lives are not firmly rooted in a particular place and time. Indeed, they are as much residents of their new community as anyone else.

Transnationalism is criticized for being too far removed from ethnic studies' efforts to empower solidarity in minority communities. Asian American Studies provides a counterargument in that its inception was based in comparative analysis of the racial discrimination against Asian Americans and Vietnamese during the Vietnam War. A collection of scholarly articles, edited by Terese Guinsatao Monberg and Morris Young, seeks to understand how transnationalism reveals ways Asian/Americans "negotiate, resist, and work against emerging, shifting, and often intensified 'highly asymmetrical relations of power.'" Furthermore, inter-movement spillover plays an important role in transnational climate change politics. Based on these findings, one can conclude that when movements come together in the form of actors and social change tactics, movements become stronger and more prominent. This is the purpose and overall effect of inter-movement spillover.

== Migration ==
Transnationalism has significant implications for the way we conceptualize immigration. Traditionally, immigration has been seen as an autonomous process, driven by conditions such as poverty and overpopulation in the country of origin and unrelated to conditions (such as foreign policy and economic needs) in the receiving country. Even though overpopulation, economic stagnation, and poverty all continue to create pressures for migration, they alone are not enough to produce large international migration flows. There are many countries, for example, which lack significant emigration history despite longstanding poverty. Also, most international immigration flows from the global South to the global North are not made up by the poorest of the poor, but, generally by professionals. In addition, there are countries with high levels of job creation that continue to witness emigration on a large scale.

The reasons and promoters for migration are not only embodied within the country of origin. Instead, they are rooted within the broader geopolitical and global dynamics. Significant evidence of geographic migration patterns suggests that receiving countries become home to immigrants from the receiving country's zone of influence. Then, immigration is but a fundamental component of the process of capitalist expansion, market penetration, and globalization. There are systematic and structural relations between globalization and immigration.

The emergence of a global economy has contributed both to the creation of potential emigrants abroad and to the formation of economic, cultural, and ideological links between industrialized and developing countries that later serve as bridges for the international migration. For example, the same set of circumstances and processes that have promoted the location of factories and offices abroad have also contributed to the creation of large supply of low-wage jobs for which immigrant workers constitute a desirable labor supply. Moreover, the decline of manufacturing jobs and the growth of the service sector, key drivers of the globalization of production, have transformed western economies’ occupational and income structure.

Unlike the manufacturing sector, which traditionally supplied middle-income jobs and competitive benefits, the majority of service jobs are either extremely well-paid or extremely poorly paid, with relatively few jobs in the middle-income range. Many of the jobs lack key benefits such as health insurance. Sales representatives, restaurant wait staff, administrative assistants, and custodial workers are among the growth occupations.

Finally, the fact that the major growth sectors rather than declining sectors are generating the most low-wage jobs shows that the supply of such jobs will continue to increase for the predictable future. The entry of migrant workers will similarly continue to meet the demand. In turn, this inflow provides the raw material out of which transnational communities emerge.

== List of transnational organizations ==
Transnational organizations include:

- Médecins Sans Frontières
- National Alliance of Latin American and Caribbean Communities
- Roman Catholic Church
- No Border network

== See also ==
- Anarchism
- Anti-globalization
- Citizenship
- Communitarian
- Cosmopolitanism
- Diaspora politics
- Global citizenship
- Globalization
- Internationalism
- Mercenary
- Multinational corporations
- Nation-states
- Nationalism
- Pan-nationalism
- Perpetual traveler
- Postnationalism
- Transnational cinema
- Transnational organization
- Transnational progressivism
- Transnationality
- Transnationality Index
- Universal brotherhood
