= International style =

International style may refer to:

- International Style, a 1920s to 70s modern movement in architecture
- International style (art), the International Gothic style in medieval art
- International Style (dancing), a term used in ballroom dancing
- International Typographic Style, a Switzerland-based graphic design movement
