= Walkermine, California =

Walkermine
- Former settlement
- Location in California
- Coordinates: 39°57′50″N 120°40′04″W
- Country: United States
- State: California
- County: Plumas
- Elevation: 6,076 ft (1,852 m)

Walkermine (earlier, International) is a former settlement in Plumas County, California, United States. It lay at an elevation of 6076 feet (1852 m). Walkermine is located 3 miles (4.8 km) southwest of Mount Ingalls.

The International post office operated from 1918 to 1923. The Walkermine post office operated from 1930 to 1941. Both names came from nearby mines.
