= Terese Guinsatao Monberg =

Terese Guinsatao Monberg is an Associate Dean in the Residential College in the Arts and Humanities (RCAH), Associate Professor of Transcultural Rhetoric and Writing, and a faculty member of the Asian Pacific American (APA) Studies program at Michigan State University. Monberg serves as a member of the Coalition of Community Writing Advisory Board, is on the Trustees Board of the Filipino American National Historical Society (FANHS), and is a co-editor of the FANHS Journal. Monberg was the co-chair of the Conference on College Composition and Communication Asian/Asian American Caucus with Stuart Ching in 2010–2012 and with K. Hyoejin Yoon from 2012-2015. Monberg was a featured lecturer in the 2020-2021 Coalition for Community Writing Zoom Lecture Series. She presented two lectures including "Listening and Being Reciprocal in Community Collaborations" and "Developing Community Engagement Curricula."

== Biography ==
=== Early life and education ===
Monberg is a third generation Filipino American and identifies as a Pinay. She grew up in and attended high school in Chicago. Monberg earned a BA in Economics from the University of Illinois at Urbana-Champaign. She received a MS and a PhD in Rhetoric from Rensselaer Polytechnic Institute.

=== Community involvement and research ===
Monberg an active member and leader in Asian American community groups. She was a Board Member of the Mid-Michigan Asian Pacific American Association (MAPAA). She is also involved with Asian/American communities at Michigan State University and in communities surrounding Lansing, Michigan. She is also an active member of the Filipino American National Historical Society (FANHS). Monberg's essay, "Like the Molave: Listening for Constellations of Community through “Growing Up Brown” Stories," analyzes oral stories collected by FANHS. This article examines how Filipinx stories work not only recover the past, but also to connect and bridge generations of Filipino Americans who have suffered from prejudices and American colonization of the Philippines throughout the early 20th Century.

Monberg's research focuses on community engagement, memory, and Asian American rhetoric. She is particularly interested in Filipinx rhetoric. According to "Resituating Reciprocity within Longer Legacies of Colonization: A Conversation," her research seeks to investigate "on-going histories of Filipinx/American colonization and resistance, to untangle legacies of intergenerational trauma and wisdom, and to gather methods for building healing centered community-based spaces." Monberg is also interested in transnational Asian American rhetorical traditions and memory as part of Asian American activism.

== Selected publications ==
- Monberg, Terese Guinsatao. “Listening for Legacies; or, How I Began to Hear Dorothy Laigo Cordova, the Pinay behind the Podium Known as FANHS.” Representations: Doing Asian American Rhetoric, 2008, pp. 83–105.
- Monberg, Terese Guinsatao. "Writing Home or Writing As the Community: Toward a Theory of Recursive Spatial Movement for Students of Color in Service-Learning Courses." Reflections, vol. 8., no. 3, 2009, pp. 21–51.
- Bernardo, Shane and Terese Guinsatao Monberg. “Resituating Reciprocity within Longer Legacies of Colonization: A Conversation.” Community Literacy Journal, vol. 14, no. 1, 2019, pp. 83–93.
- Young, Morris and Terese Guinsatao Monberg. “Beyond Representation: Spatial, Temporal and Embodied Trans/Formations of Asian/Asian American Rhetoric.” Enculturation, vol. 27, 2018.
- Monberg, Terese Guinsatao. “Ownership, Access, and Authority: Publishing and Circulating Histories to (Re)Member Community.” Community Literacy Journal, vol. 12, no. 1, 2017, pp. 30–47.
- Cushman, Ellen, and Terese Guinsatao Monberg. “Re-Centering Authority: Social Reflexivity and Re-Positioning in Composition Research.” Under Construction, 1998, pp. 166–80.

== Notable National Leadership Positions ==
- 2010-2015 CCCC Asian/Asian American Caucus Co-Chair
- 2018-2024 FANHS Trustee
