= The Internationalist =

The Internationalist was a magazine based in Seattle, Washington.

Founded in July 2004, The Internationalist grew its readership to 65,000 nationally. In 2006, the publication was awarded a Bronze Eddie Award for editorial excellence. In the fall of 2006, The Internationalist discontinued its print edition to focus exclusively online.

In September 2006, the magazine was profiled in the Seattle Post-Intelligencer.
