= List of left-wing internationals =

This is a list of socialist, communist, and anarchist, and other left-wing internationals. An "International" – such as, the "First International", the "Second International", or the "Socialist International" – may refer to a number of multi-national communist, radical liberal, socialist, or organized labour organizations, typically composed of national sections.

== Existing internationals ==
=== Global internationals ===
==== Progressive, social democratic, anti-capitalist, and socialist internationals ====
- Socialist International (Democratic socialism, Social democracy)
- Progressive Alliance (Progressivism)
- Progressive International (Progressivism, Anti-capitalism)
- International Peoples' Assembly (Progressivism, Anti-capitalism)
- World Socialist Movement (Socialism, Classical Marxism)

==== Left-communist internationals ====
- International Communist Current
- International Communist Party
- Internationalist Communist Tendency

See also: Internationalist Communist Party and Communist Workers' Organisation

==== Anarchist internationals ====
- International of Anarchist Federations (Synthesis anarchism, Anarchism without adjectives)
- International Workers' Association (Anarcho-syndicalism)
- International Confederation of Labour (Anarcho-syndicalism)
- anarkismo.net (Anarcho-communism, Platformism)

==== Marxist–Leninist, Hoxhaist, and Gonzaloist internationals ====
- International Meeting of Communist and Workers' Parties (Marxism–Leninism)
- International Conference of Marxist–Leninist Parties and Organizations (Unity & Struggle) (Hoxhaism)
- International Communist League (Gonzaloism)

==== Trotskyist, post-Trotskyist, and Posadist internationals ====
- Revolutionary Communist International (Trotskyist) – previously known as the International Marxist Tendency and the Committee for a Marxist International
- Committee for a Workers' International (Trotskyist) – claims to be refoundation of Committee for a Workers' International (1974)
- Committee for Revolutionary International Regroupment (Trotskyist)
- Fourth International (reunified) (Trotskyist)
- International Committee of the Fourth International (Trotskyist)
- International Committee of the Fourth International (Trotskyist) – associated with the Workers Revolutionary Party
- International Communist League (Fourth Internationalist) (Trotskyist) – previously known as the International Spartacist Tendency
- International Revolutionary Left (Trotskyist)
- International Socialist Alternative (Trotskyist) – claims to be successor to Committee for a Workers' International (1974)
- International Socialist Tendency (Post-Trotskyist)
- Internationalist Communist Union (Trotskyist)
- International Trotskyist Committee for the Political Regeneration of the Fourth International (Trotskyist)
- International Workers League – Fourth International (Trotskyist)
- International Workers' Unity – Fourth International (Trotskyist)
- League for the Fourth International (Trotskyist)
- League for the Revolutionary Party – Communist Organization for the Fourth International (Trotskyist)
- Organising Committee for the Reconstitution of the Fourth International (Trotskyist)
- Trotskyist Fraction – Fourth International (Trotskyist)
- Workers International to Rebuild the Fourth International (Trotskyist)
- International Bolshevik Tendency (Trotskyist)
- Bolshevik Tendency (Trotskyist)
- International Leninist Trotskyist Tendency (Trotskyist)
- Permanent Revolution Collective (Trotskyist)
- International Leninist Trotskyist Fraction (Trotskyist)
- Tendency for the Reconstruction of the Fourth International (Trotskyist)
- Internationalist Trotskyist Nucleus-Fourth International (Trotskyist)
- Fourth International Posadist (Posadist)
- Liaison Committee for the Reconstruction of the Fourth International (Trotskyist)

==== Anti-imperialist internationals ====
- International League of Peoples' Struggle
- International Coordination of Revolutionary Parties and Organizations
- World Anti-Imperialist Platform
- Anti-Imperialist League

==== Green and ecologist internationals ====
- World Ecological Parties (Ecologist)
- Global Greens (Green)

=== Regional internationals ===
- European Left Alliance for the People and the Planet (Democratic socialism, Europe)
- Now the People (Democratic socialism, Europe)
- Party of the European Left (Socialism, Europe)
- European Communist Action (Marxism–Leninism, Europe)
- Conference of Communist and Worker's Parties of the Balkans (Marxism–Leninism, Balkans)
- Communist Party of the Soviet Union (2001) (Marxism–Leninism, Post-Soviet states)
- Union of Communist Parties – Communist Party of the Soviet Union (Marxism–Leninism, Post-Soviet states)
- Foro de São Paulo (Anti-neoliberalism, Latin America)
- Permanent Conference of Political Parties of Latin America and the Caribbean (Leftism, Latin America and the Caribbean)
- Coordination Committee of Maoist Parties and Organisations of South Asia (Maoism, South Asia)

== Defunct internationals ==
- League of the Just (Christian communism, 1839–1847)
- Communist League (Marxism, 1847–1852)
- International Workingmen's Association ("First International") (Marxism, 1864–1876)
- Anarchist St. Imier International, (Collectivist anarchism, 1872–1877)
- International Working People's Association ("Black International") (Insurrectionary anarchism, Anarcho-collectivism, Anarcho-communism, 1881–1887)
- Second International (Marxism, 1889–1916)
- International Working Union of Socialist Parties ("2½ International") (Centrist Marxism, 1921–1923)
- Communist Workers' International (Council communism (1922–mid-1920s)
- Labour and Socialist International (Socialism, 1923–1940)
- Communist International ("Third International") (Marxism–Leninism, 1919–1943)
- International Revolutionary Marxist Centre ("3½ International") (Centrist Marxism, 1932–1940s)
- Revolutionary Workers Ferment (Left communism, 1948–unknown)
- Fourth International (Trotskyism, 1938–1953)
- Situationist International (Situationism, 1957–1971)
- Trotskyist International Liaison Committee (Trotskyism, 1979–1984)
- International League for the Reconstruction of the Fourth International (Trotskyism, 1973–1995)
- International Libertarian Solidarity (Anarchism, 2001–2005)
- Revolutionary Internationalist Movement (Marxism–Leninism–Maoism, 1984–2012)
- International Communist Seminar (Marxism–Leninism, 1992–2014)
- International Conference of Marxist–Leninist Parties and Organizations (International Newsletter) (Marxism–Leninism, Mao Zedong Thought, 1988–2017)
- Coordinating Committee for the Refoundation of the Fourth International (Trotskyism, 2004–2017)
- Committee for a Workers' International (Trotskyism, 1974–2019)
- Initiative of Communist and Workers' Parties (Marxism–Leninism, Europe, 2013–2023)

== See also ==
- List of Trotskyist internationals
- Fifth International
- List of international labor organizations
- Political international
