= Ilaria Salis =

Italian politician, activist, writer and teacher

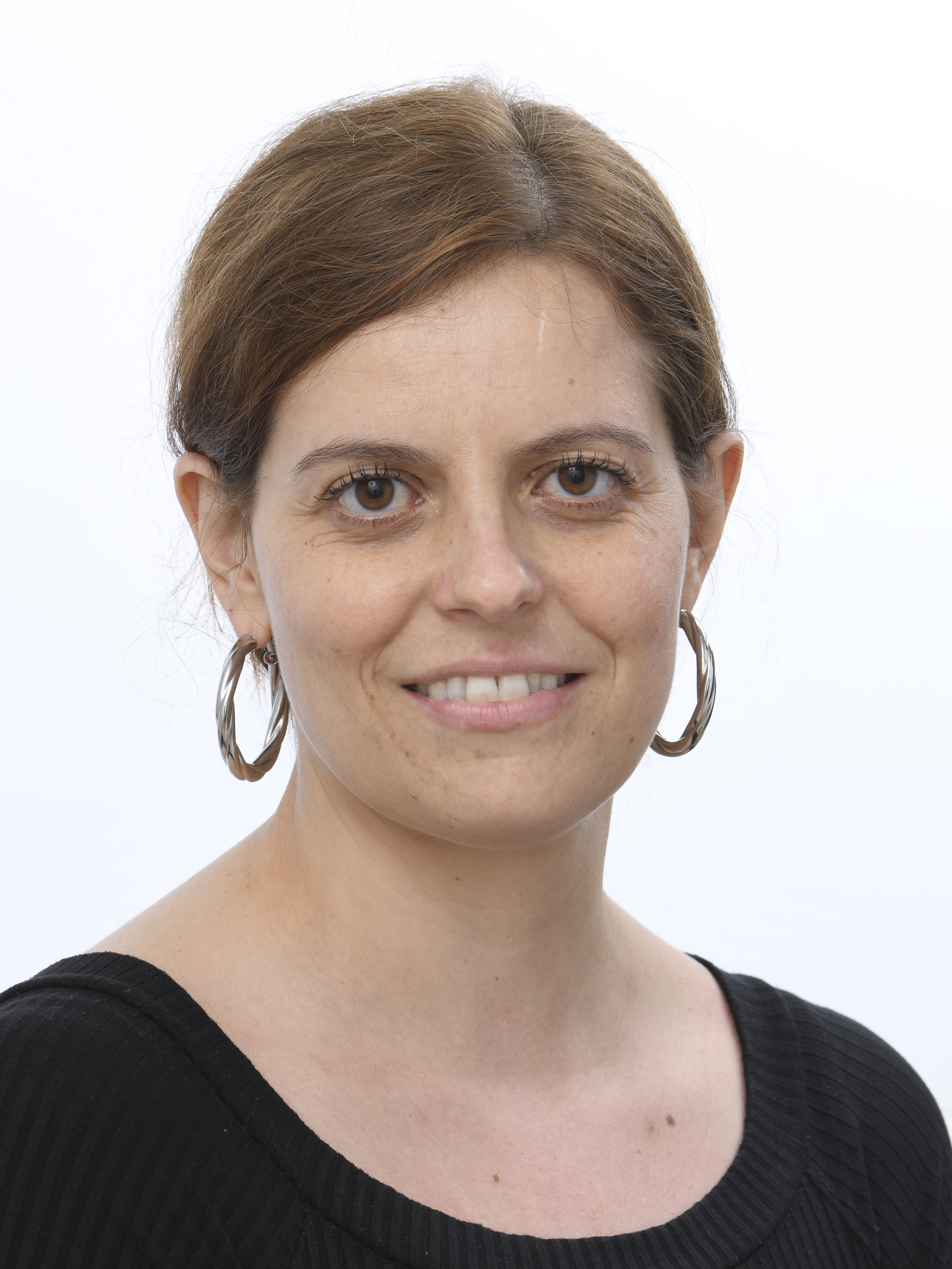
- Salis in 2024

Member of the European Parliament for North-West Italy
- Incumbent
- Assumed office 16 July 2024

Personal details
- Born: 17 June 1984 (age 42) Milan, Italy
- Party: Italian Left (2026–present)
- Education: University of Milan (BA, MA)
- Occupation: Teacher

Ilaria Salis (born 17 June 1984) is an Italian politician, activist, writer and teacher. She was elected as a Member of the European Parliament in 2024 for the Green and Left Alliance, and on 6 June 2026 she joined Italian Left.

== Biography ==
Salis was born on 17 June 1984 in Milan and grew up in Monza, Italy. She received a undergraduate degree in history at the University of Milan, graduating in December 2005. After completing her undergraduate degree, she worked as a primary school teacher. In 2021 she obtained a Master's degree in philology, literature and history of antiquity from the University of Milan.

=== Arrest and detention ===
On 11 February 2023, Salis was arrested in Hungary, after alleged assaults on neo-Nazis at a far-right event in Budapest. She was charged with three counts of attempted assault and accused of being part of an extreme left-wing organization. She denied the charges and the alleged victims of the attacks did not file reports with police.

According to media reports, Salis suffered numerous violations of her fundamental rights during her incarceration, deprived of access to basic hygiene products, including during her period, forced to wear soiled clothing, suffering from malnutrition, deprived of basic medical care, and prevented from communicating with her family for more than six months, subjected to more than a month of solitary confinement, and detained in a cell infested with insects. She was also subjected to interrogations without a lawyer or translator and was shackled at the ankles in a Hungarian court in 2024. Her legal team was repeatedly denied access to the case file, while Hungarian government officials publicly portrayed her as guilty. During the hearings, neo-Nazi activists in paramilitary uniforms intimidated those suspected of supporting her.

Amid rising public outrage in her home country, the Italian government protested the shackling of Salis with chains around her hand and feet for her trial appearance. On 19 December 2023, seven Italian MEPs with the Progressive Alliance of Socialists and Democrats accused the Hungarian government of holding her "bound by the neck in a cell with mice and cockroaches" and argued that the "injuries of the two assaulted individuals who reported her were only minor". Salis wrote that she spent "23 hours out of 24 in a completely closed cell".

In May 2024, shortly before the European elections, she was released from prison and transferred to house arrest in Budapest.

=== Election to the European Parliament ===
In June 2024, Salis was elected as a Member of the European Parliament (MEP) for the Greens and Left Alliance, obtaining more than 170,000 votes. As a MEP, she gained parliamentary immunity and was released from house arrest, finally returning to Italy.

She plans to leverage her role to advocate for the rights of incarcerated individuals, address the housing shortage, and tackle the issue of excessive rental costs.

In October 2024, Hungarian prosecutors requested that the European Parliament lift her immunity. The European Parliament Committee on Legal Affairs rejected the request in September 2025, stating that she would not get a fair trial. This led to the closure of the trial, and, in case of the end of parliamentary immunity, it would have to start from the beginning, if one wanted to prosecute her for the same charges.

== Political positions ==
Salis is a self-proclaimed eco-socialist, and an anti-fascist activist. Although she has been described as an anarchist, she rejects this label. Her father has said that she was an anarchist in the past, but not anymore, and that now she's a committed communist.

Salis has taken positions against capitalism and billionaires (like Elon Musk), criticizing the privatization model and advocating the need for a socialist proposal. She also advocates a four-day workweek.

Having also been active in the movement for the right to housing, Salis supports a public housing plan, rent caps (including short-term rentals and Airbnbs), and greater protection against evictions. She also stated that "who enters an uninhabited house takes without depriving anyone, except for urban decay, racketeering, and unscrupulous real estate speculators", also criticizing the fact that many public housing units in Italy remain unassigned.

Salis supports the abolition of youth detention centers and, more broadly, advocates for the abolition of prisons in the long term, adopting a system similar to that of the Nordic countries, based on social reintegration. She also opposes police's use of Tasers, citing a report by the Antigone Association.

== Controversies ==
ALER (Lombard Residential Housing Agency) accused Salis of illegally occupying a public housing unit, seeking €90,000 in compensation. However, Salis countered that, following her identification in 2008, no checks were conducted for 16 years to verify whether she was living there, and no civil or criminal proceedings were ever initiated against her about that.

On 10 March 2026, a court ordered Salis to pay €300,000 in damages (plus €10,000 in legal fees) to two former associates who had worked with her, also during the election campaign, after she dismissed them in 2025 (prior to their contracts' 2029 expiration date). Salis challenged the decision and announced she would appeal, stating that her decision was adequately motivated and that, furthermore, she had not been notified of the court hearing, thus having no possibility to defend herself. On 12 October, the conviction was overturned, and the trial will have to start from the beginning.

== In popular culture ==
In January 2024, Zerocalcare dedicated to Ilaria Salis his graphic novel "At the bottom of the well. A story of Nazis, prison and responsibility", initially published in the weekly Internazionale, followed by other update strips in the following issues. In the following June, Zerocalcare's comics on the Salis case were collected and published together with some unpublished ones in the volume This night will not be short.

== Works ==
- I. Salis, Ivan Bonnin, Vipera, 2025 (autobiography) (in Italian)
