= International Communist Seminar =

Conference of worldwide communist parties

The International Communist Seminar (ICS) was an annual communist conference held in May in Brussels, Belgium. It was organized by the Workers' Party of Belgium (WPB).

In 1992, Ludo Martens, leader of the WPB initiated the conference, which gathered various tendencies of Marxist–Leninist parties and organizations. He is noted for having proposed the unification of the four main tendencies of the Marxist-Leninist movement. These are the pro-Soviet groups, the pro-Chinese, the pro-Albanian, and pro-Cuban. Around 200 organizations of Africa, Latin America, North America, Asia and Europe have taken part in it. For four years, from 1992 to 1995, the ICS worked on identifying "the true causes of the capitalist restoration in Soviet Union" and in Eastern Europe and to draw lessons from it for the future.

The last seminar took place in June 2014. The member parties have largely been absorbed into International Meeting of Communist and Workers' Parties.

== Annual conference ==
Themes of the recent ICS Conferences:

- 1996: The anti-imperialist struggle under the New World Order.
- 1997: The way of the October revolution is the way of the liberation of the workers
- 1998: The working class, its leading role, new forms of exploitation and experiences of struggle and organization.
- 1999: Imperialism means war
- 2000: Imperialism, fascization and fascism
- 2001: The world socialist revolution in the conditions of imperialist globalization.
- 2002: Economical crises and the possibility of a major world crisis
- 2003: The Marxist-Leninist Party and the anti-imperialist Front facing the war
- 2004: The strategy and tactics of the struggle against global US imperialist war
- 2005: Internationalist experiences and tasks of Communists in the struggle against imperialism
- 2006: Present and past experiences in the international communist movement: "The impact of the Communist International on the founding and the development of the communist parties in particular countries", "The exchange of concrete experiences of Party work in the working class and among the youth"
- 2011: The strengthening of communist parties in times of a deepening capitalist systemic crisis
- 2013: The attacks on the democratic rights and freedoms in the world capitalist crisis
- 2014: 100 years after World War I – The world in 2014

== Participating parties ==
- Afghanistan, People's Party of Afghanistan
- Algeria, Algerian Party for Democracy and Socialism
- Azerbaijan, Azerbaijan Communist Party
- Belarus, Belarusian Communist Workers' Party
- Belgium, Workers' Party of Belgium
- Benin, Communist Party of Benin
- Brazil, Communist Party of Brazil
- Brazil, Free Fatherland Party
- Bulgaria, Party of the Bulgarian Communists
- China, Chinese Communist Party
- Colombia, Colombian Communist Party
- Cuba, Communist Party of Cuba
- Cyprus, Progressive Party of Working People
- Denmark, Communist Party in Denmark
- Denmark, Communist Party of Denmark
- France, Pole of Communist Revival in France
- France, Union of Revolutionary Communists of France
- Germany, German Communist Party
- Greece, Communist Party of Greece
- Hungary, Hungarian Workers' Party
- Iran, Tudeh Party of Iran
- Ireland, The Workers' Party
- Laos, Lao People's Revolutionary Party
- Latvia, Socialist Party of Latvia
- Lebanon, Lebanese Communist Party
- Lithuania, Socialist People's Front
- Luxembourg, Communist Party of Luxembourg
- Malta, Communist Party of Malta
- Mexico, Popular Socialist Party of Mexico
- Netherlands, New Communist Party–NCPN
- North Korea, Workers' Party of Korea
- Palestine, Palestinian Communist Party
- Palestine, Popular Front for the Liberation of Palestine
- Philippines, Partido Komunista ng Pilipinas-1930
- Portugal, Portuguese Communist Party
- Russia, Communist Party of the Russian Federation
- Russia, Communist Party of the Soviet Union
- Russia, Russian Communist Workers' Party of the Communist Party of the Soviet Union
- Serbia, New Communist Party of Yugoslavia
- South Sudan, Communist Party of South Sudan
- Spain, Communist Party of Spain
- Spain, Communist Party of the Peoples of Spain
- Spain, Spanish Communist Workers' Party
- Sri Lanka, People's Liberation Front
- Sweden, Communist Party
- Switzerland, Communist Party of Geneva - "Les Communistes"
- Switzerland, Communist Party of Southern Switzerland
- Switzerland, Swiss Party of Labour
- Taiwan, Labor Party
- Tunisia, Democratic Patriots' Unified Party
- Turkey, Communist Party of Turkey
- Turkey, Labour Party
- Ukraine, Union of Communists of Ukraine
- United Kingdom, Communist Party of Great Britain (Marxist–Leninist)
- United States, Freedom Road Socialist Organization
- Venezuela, Communist Party of Venezuela
- Vietnam, Communist Party of Vietnam

== See also ==
- International Meeting of Communist and Workers' Parties
- List of left-wing internationals
