= Political international =

Transnational organizations coordinating similar political parties

A political international is a transnational organization of political parties having similar ideology or political orientation (e.g. communism, socialism, Islamism). The international works together on points of agreement to co-ordinate activity.

Political internationals have increased in popularity and influence since their beginnings in the political left of 19th-century Europe, as political activists have paid more attention to developments for or against their ideological favor in other countries and continents. After World War II, other ideological movements formed their political internationals to communicate among aligned parliamentarians and legislative candidates as well as to communicate with intergovernmental and supranational organizations such as the United Nations and later the European Union. Internationals also form supranational and regional branches (e.g. a European branch or an African branch) and maintain fraternal or governing relationships with sector-specific wings (e.g. youth or women's wings).

Although the Communist International exerted a significant amount of control over its constituent national parties, in the present day, internationals usually do not have a significant role. Internationals provide the parties an opportunity for sharing of experience. The parties belonging to internationals have various organizational obligations and can be expelled for not meeting those obligations. For example, during the 2011 Arab Spring the Socialist International expelled the governing parties of Tunisia and Egypt for performing actions incompatible with the values of this international.

== List of internationals ==
=== Current ===
- Marxism–Leninism, Maoism and Hoxhaism
  - International Meeting of Communist and Workers Parties (Marxism–Leninism), founded in 1998
- Trotskyism
  - Revolutionary Communist International (2024) Successor of the IMT
  - Committee for a Workers' International (2019) split from CWI/founded in 2019
  - International Socialist Tendency (Third Camp Trotskyism), founded in 1958
  - International Workers League – Fourth International (Trotskyism), founded in 1982
  - International Socialist Alternative Split from CWI/founded in 2019
  - Trotskyist Fraction – Fourth International (Trotskyism), founded in 2004
- Islamism
  - Muslim Brotherhood (Islamism), founded in 1928
  - Hizb ut-Tahrir (Islamism), founded in 1958
- Progressivism, democratic socialism and social democracy
  - São Paulo Forum (socialism of the 21st century), founded in 1990
  - Progressive Alliance (social democracy and progressivism), a network of centre-left parties formed as a rival to the Socialist International in 2013
  - Progressive International (democratic socialism and progressivism), an organization uniting progressive left-wing activists and organizations, formed in 2020
  - International Peoples' Assembly
  - Socialist International (social democracy), founded in 1951
- Anarchism
  - International of Anarchist Federations (synthesis anarchism), founded in 1968
  - International Confederation of Labor (in Spanish) (anarcho-syndicalism), founded in 2018
  - International Workers' Association (anarcho-syndicalism), founded in 1922
- Conservatism
  - International Democracy Union (Liberal conservatism), founded in 1983
  - Centrist Democrat International (Christian democracy), founded in 1961
  - Alliance for Responsible Citizenship (Neoconservativism)
  - Worldwide Freedom Initiative (National conservativism)
  - World League for Freedom and Democracy (Neoconservativism), founded in 1966. Focused on supporting Taiwan against communist China
- Liberalism
  - Liberal International (liberalism), founded in 1947 and constituted by the Oxford Manifesto
- Libertarianism
  - International Alliance of Libertarian Parties (libertarianism), founded in 2015
- Other
  - African Socialist International (Pan-Africanism), founded in 1981
  - Global Greens (green politics), founded in 2001
  - Humanist International (humanism), founded in 1989 by the Humanist Movement
  - International Monarchist League (monarchism, constitutional monarchy), founded in 1943
  - International League of Peoples' Struggle (anti-imperialism), founded in 2001
  - Paneuropean Union (Pan-Europeanism), founded in 1923
  - Pirate Parties International (pirate politics), founded in 2010
  - World Anti-Imperialist Platform (anti-imperialism), founded in 2022
  - World Union of National Socialists (Nazism), founded in 1962
  - World Socialist Movement (Marxism), founded in 1904
  - For the Freedom of Nations! (Anti-Western sentiment), founded in 2024
  - International Degrowth Network (Degrowth), founded in 2023

=== Defunct ===
- Anarchism
  - Anarchist St. Imier International (anarchism), formed after the expulsion of the anarchists from the First International by the Marxist faction at the Hague Congress, founded in 1872 and defunct by 1877
  - International Libertarian Solidarity (anarchism), founded in 2001
  - International Working People's Association (anarchism), also known as the Black International, founded in 1881 and defunct by 1886
- Left
  - Young Europe (republicanism), 1834-1836
  - Committee for a Workers' International (Trotskyism), founded in 1974, split in various groups in 2018-19
  - Communist International (revolutionary socialism), also known as Comintern and the Third International, a federation of communist parties founded in 1919 by Vladimir Lenin and dissolved in 1943 by Joseph Stalin
  - Revolutionary Internationalist Movement, (Maoism) 1984–unknown
  - Second International (socialism), founded in 1889 and dissolved in 1916
  - Situationist International (libertarian socialism), revolutionary grouping operating from 1957 to 1972
  - International Workingmen's Association (communism, anarchism and revolutionary socialism), commonly known as the First International, founded in 1864 and defunct by 1876
  - International Communist Seminar (Marxism–Leninism), founded in 1996 and defunct by 2014
  - International Conference of Marxist–Leninist Parties and Organizations (International Newsletter), founded in 1998, defunct by 2017
  - International Revolutionary Marxist Centre (Centrist Marxism), founded in 1932 and dissolved in 1940
- Far right
  - Fascist International (fascism), also known as the 1934 Montreux Fascist conference, a conference of European fascist parties held on 16–17 December 1934 in Montreux, Switzerland
- Other
  - International League of Peace and Freedom (European federalism), operating from 1867 to 1874
  - International Agrarian Bureau (agrarianism), operating from 1921 to 1972
  - International Entente of Radical and Similar Democratic Parties (radicalism and liberalism), operating from 1923 to 1938
  - E2D International (E-democracy, direct democracy), founded on 1 January 2011, but inactive since 29 August 2013
  - International Secretariat of Democratic Parties of Christian Inspiration (Christian democracy), founded in 1925 and dissolved in 1939
  - Alliance of Democrats (liberalism), gathering groups similar in outlook to the European Democratic Party and the United States Democratic Party founded in 2005, but inactive since 2012

== See also ==
- Transnational political party
- List of international labor organizations
- List of left-wing internationals
- List of Trotskyist internationals
