= Internazionale (magazine) =

Italian language weekly news magazine

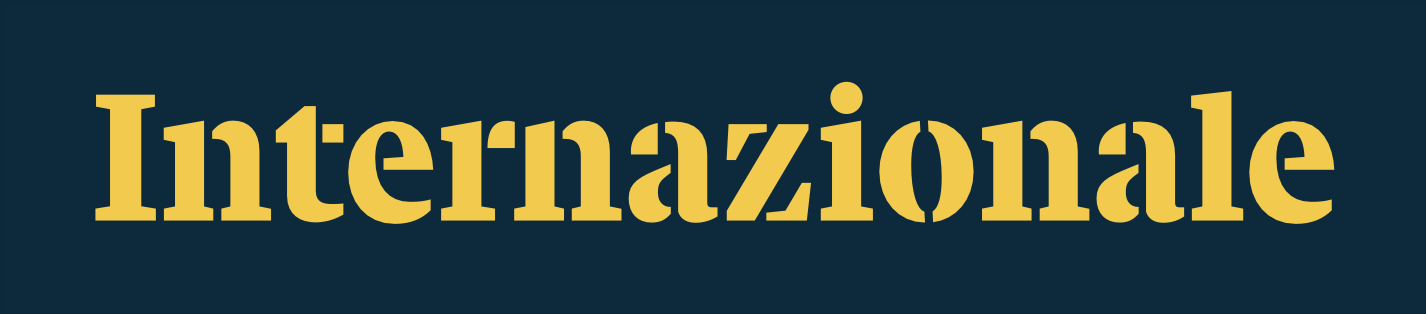
- Editor: Giovanni De Mauro
- Categories: News magazine
- Frequency: Weekly
- Circulation: 125,000 (2015)
- Publisher: Internazionale spa
- First issue: 1993
- Country: Italy
- Language: Italian website = www.internazionale.it

The Internazionale is an Italian news magazine published in Rome. It was founded in 1993 by Giovanni De Mauro. It publishes articles from foreign newspapers and magazines translated into Italian. It is published every friday and is available at newsstands.

It has a website featuring daily newsletters and a collection of links to newspapers from around the world. The weekly magazine is also available in digital formats, including PDF and MP3, as well as through applications for Android and iOS. Alongside its magazine activities, Internazionale has published a book series titled Fusi orari through its own publishing house. The series includes reportage, essays, fiction, personal accounts, photography and comics.

All written material produced by the editorial staff is available under the Creative Commons Attribution-NonCommercial-ShareAlike 3.0 (CC BY-NC-SA 3.0) licence. Since 7 July 2014, the magazine has also been available at newsstands in London.

In 2008, the magazine had an estimated readership of approximately 123,000, including 33,000 subscribers and 90,000 newsstand sales. The Board of Directors of Internazionale S.p.A. is chaired by Brunetto Tini, while Giuseppe Cornetto Bourlot serves as Vice-Chairman.

The magazine was inspired by the French equivalent, Courrier International, founded in 1990.
