= Inter =

Inter may refer to:

== Association football clubs ==
- Inter Milan, an Italian club
- SC Internacional, a Brazilian club
- Inter Miami CF, an American club
- Inter Playa del Carmen, a Mexican club
- FC Inter Sibiu, a Romanian club
- FC Inter Turku, a Finnish club
- FK Inter Bratislava, a Slovak club
- NK Inter Zaprešić, a Croatian club
- FC Internaţional Curtea de Argeş, a Romanian club
- Esporte Clube Internacional, a Brazilian club from Santa Maria
- Esporte Clube Internacional (SC), a Brazilian club from Lages
- Associação Atlética Internacional, a Brazilian club from Limeira
- Inter Luanda, an Angolan club
- Inter Baku FK, an Azerbaijani club
- Inter Club d'Escaldes, an Andorran club
- Inter Leipzig, a German club
- Inter de Grand-Goâve, a Haitian club
- Inter Kediri, an Indonesian club
- Internacional de Madrid, a Spanish club
- Inter Moengotapoe, a Surinamese club
- Inter Cardiff FC, a Welsh club
- Inter Kashi FC, an Indian club from Varanashi, Uttar Pradesh

== Airlines ==
- Intercontinental de Aviación, or Inter, a Colombian airline
- Inter Airlines, a Turkish airline
- Air Inter, a French airline

== Media ==
- Inter TV, a television channel dedicated to Inter Milan
- Inter (TV channel), a Ukrainian TV channel
- Inter (Venezuelan broadcaster), a Venezuelan telecommunications company
- France Inter, a French radio station

== Other ==
- To put into a grave; bury
- An intersex person
- Inter FS, a Spanish futsal club
- Inter (band), British band
- Inter-American University of Puerto Rico
- Ralf Brown's Interrupt List, a comprehensive list of x86 interrupts and structures
- Intermediate tyre, a type of wet-weather tyre used in racing
- Inter (typeface), a neo-grotesque sans-serif typeface by Rasmus Andersson

== See also ==
- Interact (disambiguation)
- Interchange (disambiguation)
- Interior (disambiguation)
