= Transnational organization =

Transnational organization is a term used in scholarly literature. It refers to international organizations (usually, international nongovernmental organizations) that "transcend" the idea of a nation-state.

The distinction between an international and a transnational organization is unclear and has been criticized by some scholars (ex. Colás, 2002).

Transnational relations have been defined as “contacts, coalitions, and interactions across state boundaries that are not controlled by the central foreign policy organs of governments.” Examples of transnational entities are “multinational business enterprises and revolutionary movements; trade unions and scientific networks; international air transport cartels and communications activities in outer space.” Transnational social movements are “the broad tendencies that often manifest themselves in particular International Non-Governmental Organizations (INGOs).” Examples of transnational social movements include human rights, women's, peace, labor, green, or student movements manifested in International Romani Union, Amnesty International, the Peace Brigades International, the International Confederation of Free Trade Unions, etc. A further definition: “An organization is "transnational" rather than "national" if it carries on significant centrally-directed operations in the territory of two or more nation-states. Similarly, an organization will be called "international" rather than "national" only if the control of the organization is explicitly shared among representatives of two or more nationalities. And an organization is "multinational" rather than "national" only if people from two or more nationalities participate significantly in its operation.” “Transnational organizations are designed to facilitate the pursuit of a single interest within many national units.”

== See also ==
- Transnationalism
- Transnationality
