= Look Left =

Look Left may refer to:

- Look Left (album), a 1994 album by Alison Brown
- Look Left (Ireland), a bi-monthly political magazine produced by the Workers Party of Ireland
- Look Left (OULC), a termly magazine produced by the Oxford University Labour Club
