= Chris Hudson (trade unionist) =

Irish former trade union activist

Christopher Hudson is an Irish former trade union activist who subsequently became a Unitarian minister in Northern Ireland. During the final years of the Troubles Hudson became prominent as a negotiator between the loyalist Ulster Volunteer Force (UVF) and the Irish government and played a key role helping to deliver the Northern Ireland peace process.

== Early life ==
Hudson was born in Dún Laoghaire, Ireland into a Catholic family with a strong Irish republican tradition. His father was a member of the original Irish Republican Army and an associate of Éamon de Valera, becoming a founder member of his political party Fianna Fáil. His mother originally came from Belfast but her parents fled their Ormeau Road home in 1922 after receiving death threats from loyalists, moving to Dublin. Their marriage had been mixed-faith, something frowned upon at the time in Belfast.

Hudson's uncle was executed by the Irish Free State government during the Irish Civil War for his activity with the IRA and later a road in his native Dún Laoghaire was named in his honour.

Hudson played in a band, the Chosen Few, with Fran O'Toole, who also played in the Miami Showband. O'Toole was subsequently killed in 1975 by the Mid-Ulster UVF as part of the Miami Showband killings. He also worked as a hairdresser, a writer and in amateur theatre before following a career in the Irish post office.

== Activism ==
Married to Dr Isabella Evangelisti, an art historian, Hudson became a prominent figure with the Communication Workers Union.

He also became prominent in the Peace Train Organisation, a group campaigned against bomb attacks on the Dublin to Belfast railway line. He was made a Member of the Order of the British Empire by the UK government for his role in this group. His work with the Peace Train movement brought him into contact with several figures on both sides of the border, and he was close to Ulster Unionist Party activists Michael and Chris McGimpsey as well as Fergus Finlay, a figure in the Irish Labour Party.

== UVF negotiations ==
On 29 March 1993 several community activists from the Shankill Road, who were also secretly members of the UVF, attended a discussion about cross-community class co-operation in Northern Ireland hosted by Republican Sinn Féin in Dublin. Following the meeting Hudson, who had long held a desire to engage with working class Protestants, met some of the UVF members in a bar. In the pub Hudson told the UVF members that he abhorred the killings that had just taken place at a Belfast bookmakers – an attack actually carried out by the Ulster Defence Association (UDA) – and in response they asked him if he would like to put his objections directly to the UVF leadership. Hudson agreed to hold a meeting.

Soon after this meeting Hudson was invited to visit Belfast by David Ervine, a leading figure in the UVF's political wing the Progressive Unionist Party. Hudson travelled to Belfast on 9 June 1993 and met Ervine in Duke's Hotel in the south of the city. The two then travelled to the Shankill where Hudson held a meeting with the head of the UVF and his second-in-command, known as "The Craftsman". The meeting, which was held in the offices of the Shankill Historical Society, was fraught and saw the UVF leadership make direct threats to Hudson to bomb Dublin. He would subsequently describe this early meeting as difficult, although he added that he trusted Ervine as an individual from the start. Following the meeting Hudson informed Fergus Finlay about this new line of contact and when he met the UVF leadership again in November 1993 he carried messages between the two parties.

Hudson's meetings were controversial as they came at a time of comparatively high activity for the UVF. Between his first and second meetings with the leadership the UVF killed six people, five Catholic civilians and a prison officer. Nonetheless, he continued to keep in contact with the UVF and passed information between them and Finlay. At the time Finlay was working directly under Dick Spring and he too was aware of the meetings, advising Finlay about the contents of his communications whilst ensuring that the Irish government maintained a policy of no direct negotiations with any paramilitary groups without ceasefire.

Hudson continued to liaise closely with Ervine throughout late 1993 and early 1994. Again however the UVF campaign of violence increased, with a series of letter and parcel bomb attacks launched on both sides of the border in early 1994. Hudson's phone conversations with the UVF leadership became increasingly tense as they continued to make threats to attack Dublin.

Immediately after the Loughinisland massacre Hudson told Ervine in a phone call that he wanted to break off contact with the UVF, although he was convinced otherwise. A face to face meeting Hudson held with the UVF leadership a few days after Loughinisland was especially tense, with several threats made against Ireland, including a claim that the UVF would kill an American tourist in Dublin as a headline grabber.

On 31 August 1994 the Provisional IRA (PIRA) announced a ceasefire and three days later Hudson again visited Belfast to meet Ervine and Gusty Spence. He informed them that the Dublin government would only meet the loyalists if they also called a ceasefire but also brought them assurances that any upcoming meetings between Albert Reynolds and Gerry Adams would not be the beginning of a Dublin-PIRA alliance. Hudson briefly attended a Sinn Féin "peace commission" event soon after the ceasefire although his involvement in the event was not a success. By this point Hudson had become known for presenting a sympathetic view of loyalists, which led to some criticism in the Irish press. A UVF bomb in Connolly Station on 12 September 1994 (which failed to detonate properly) proved especially embarrassing for Hudson, given his background with the Peace Train campaign. His role in talking to the UVF having become public knowledge, saw him mocked in An Phoblacht as a result of the train attack.

The Combined Loyalist Military Command (CLMC) announced its own ceasefire on 13 October 1994, although Hudson was at the time in Pakistan doing charity work for Oxfam. However, on his return he immediately reopened his lines of communication and helped to arrange informal early meetings between Dick Spring and Gusty Spence.

In the aftermath of the CLMC ceasefire he met UDA brigadier and Ulster Democratic Party negotiator Joe English by chance in a Dublin hotel, although he did not mediate with the UDA as formal contact with the Irish government had already been opened by that point. Nonetheless, Hudson and English became friends through their joint-involvement in a number of cross-border initiatives and in July 1999 they visited the site of the Battle of the Somme together.

== Unitarianism ==
Raised a Catholic, Hudson dabbled with atheism during his teenage years. He subsequently became attracted to liberal Protestantism and got involved in Unitarianism, attending the Dublin Unitarian Church. He served as a lay minister before being ordained in 2005. Following his ordination he was moved to All Souls' Church in south Belfast to serve as a minister. In 2019 he was installed as moderator of the Non-subscribing Presbyterian Church of Ireland.

== Subsequent activity ==
Hudson was involved in the campaign to stop the extradition of Workers' Party activist Seán Garland to the USA. The application for extradition was refused by the Irish High Court in 2011. He has also been active as a campaigner for LGBT rights. He has remained in contact with loyalist paramilitary leaders.

== Bibliography ==
- Cusack, J. & McDonald, H., UVF, Poolbeg, 1997
- McDonald, H. & Cusack, J., UDA: Inside the Heart of Loyalist Terror, Penguin Ireland, 2004
- Moloney, E., Voices From the Grave: Two Men's War in Ireland, Faber & Faber, 2011
- Sinnerton, H., David Ervine: Uncharted Waters, Brandon, 2003
- Taylor, P., Loyalists, Bloomsbury, 2000
