= Stolen Moments =

Stolen Moments may refer to:

- Stolen Moments (film), a 1920 film starring Rudolph Valentino
- "Stolen Moments" (Oliver Nelson song), a 1960 jazz standard by Oliver Nelson
- "Stolen Moments" (Jim Witter song), a 1993 song by Jim Witter
- Stolen Moments (Oliver Nelson album), 1975
- Stolen Moments (Jimmy Raney and Doug Raney album), 1979
- Stolen Moments (John Hiatt album), 1990
- Stolen Moments (Lee Ritenour album), 1990
- Stolen Moments (Alison Brown album), 2005
- Stolen Moments (Prudence Liew album)
- "Stolen Moments", a song by Dan Fogelberg from his 1981 album, The Innocent Age
- "Stolen Moments", a song by Alicia Keys from her 2005 live album, Unplugged
- "Stolen Moments" (Doctors), a 2002 television episode
