= The Company You Keep =

The Company You Keep may refer to:

- The Company You Keep (John Gorka album) (2001)
- The Company You Keep (Alison Brown album) (2009)
- The Company You Keep (film), a 2012 political thriller film
- The Company You Keep (TV series), a 2023 American television series

== See also ==
- The Company We Keep, an album by the Del McCoury Band
