= Evergreen (Alison Brown album) =

Studio album by Alison Brown
- Released: August 12, 2008
- Genre: Jazz
- Label: Compass
- Producer: Garry West

Alison Brown chronology
Vanguard Visionaries (2005)	Evergreen (2008)	The Company You Keep (2009)

Evergreen is a Christmas album by American banjoist Alison Brown, released in 2008.

Arranged in a jazzy style, the album features fiddler/mandolinists Joe Craven and is often compared with similar Christmas album effort by Béla Fleck and the Flecktones, Jingle All the Way.

== Reception ==
Professional ratings
Review scores
Source	Rating
Allmusic	4/5 stars

In his Allmusic review, music critic Rick Anderson wrote "No one who likes Christmas music will be able to resist the charms of this album."

== Track listing ==
1. "Carol and the Kings: Carol of the Bells/We Three Kings" (Traditional) – 5:10
2. "Sleigh Ride" (Anderson, Parish) – 3:43
3. "Two Santas: Here Comes Santa Claus/Santa Claus Is Coming to Town" (Autry, Coots, Gillespie) – 4:32
4. "Christmas Don't Be Late" (Bagdasarian) – 3:34
5. "O'Carolan's/Welcome Christmas: O'Carolan's Farewell/Welcome Christmas" (Geisel, Hague, O'Carolan) – 3:38
6. "Skating/Feliz Navidad" (Guaraldi, trad.) – 4:12
7. "Silver Bells" (Evans, Livingston) – 3:59
8. "Let It Snow! Let It Snow! Let It Snow!" (Cahn, Styne) – 3:20
9. "Christmas Time is Here" (Guaraldi, Mendelson) – 4:01
10. "The Little Drummer Boy" (Davis) – 4:13
11. "Christmas Don't Be Late (reprise)" (Bagdasarian) – 1:02

== Personnel ==
- Alison Brown – banjo, guitar
- Larry Atamanuik – drums
- John Burr – piano
- Joe Craven – fiddle, mandolin, percussion
- Gary West – bass
