= The Best of the Vanguard Years =

The Best of the Vanguard Years or similar may refer to:

- The Best of the Vanguard Years (John Fahey album), 1999
- The Best of the Vanguard Years (Odetta album), 1999
- The Best of the Vanguard Years (Buffy Sainte-Marie album)
- Best of the Vanguard Years (Alison Brown album), 2002
- Best of the Vanguard Years (Ramblin' Jack Elliott album), 2000
- The Vanguard Years (Doc Watson album), 1995
