= Quartet (Alison Brown album) =

Studio album by Alison Brown
- Released: 1996
- Genre: Jazz
- Length: 46:21
- Label: Vanguard
- Producer: Garry West

Alison Brown chronology
Look Left (1994)	Quartet (1996)	Out of the Blue (1998)

Quartet is an album by American banjoist Alison Brown, released in 1996.

== Reception ==
Professional ratings
Review scores
Source	Rating
AllMusic	3/5 stars

In his AllMusic review, music critic Rick Anderson noted the flexibility of the banjo in jazz and bebop and complimented many tracks. He also noted "This sort of stylistic variety is grist for Brown's mill, but it doesn't always work in her favor: "My Favorite Marsha" (one of several tracks on which she switches to guitar) is nice but borders on new acoustic sappiness—her guitar playing is good but not exceptional."

Grant Alden, of No Depression, had little good to say of the release, calling it "a straightforward jazz record, typical of the bland easy-listening music which now passes for that once dangerous and seductive music. It is distinctive only in that the principal instrument is a banjo, though Brown plays almost entirely without syncopation, and the band wouldn’t know how to swing if they were on a playground."

== Track listing ==
All compositions by Alison Brown unless otherwise noted.

1. "G Bop" (Brown, Burr, Reed, West) – 3:10
2. "The Red Balloon" – 3:00
3. "My Favorite Marsha" – 3:56
4. "Mambo Banjo (Revisited)" – 3:45
5. "Without Anastasia" – 3:11
6. "Song of Monterrey" – 4:53
7. "Minding Rupert" (Brown, Burr) – 3:18
8. "The Wonderful Sea Voyage" (Brown, West) – 4:07
9. "Hello Mendocino !" – 3:59
10. "The Day Sweeps Back" – 3:16

== Personnel ==
- Alison Brown – banjo, guitar
- John Burr – piano, keyboards
- Rick Reed – drums
- Garry West – bass
