= Peace Train Organisation =

The Peace Train Organisation was a campaign group set up in 1989 in both the Republic of Ireland and Northern Ireland in response to the repeated bombing of the Dublin to Belfast railway line (see Enterprise (train)) by the Provisional IRA.

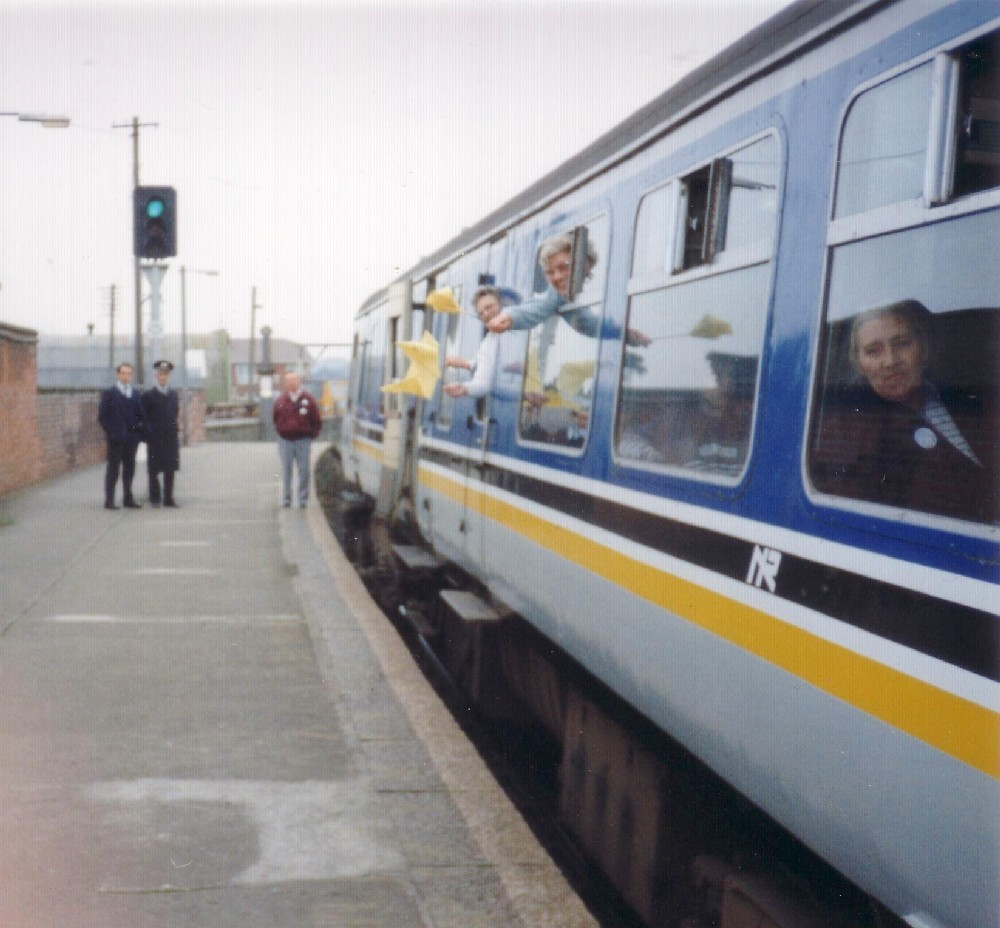
"Peace Train" stopped at Portadown (1989)

== Organisers ==
The founding Chairman of the Peace Train Organisation was the writer and broadcaster Sam McAughtry while the organisation in the Republic of Ireland was headed up by Rev. Christopher Hudson. Other key figures in the organisation south of the border were the then Workers' Party MEP Proinsias De Rossa, Tom French and southern secretary Seán Ó Cionnaith. In the North key figures included Paddy Devlin, Chris and Michael McGimpsey, Dr Liam Kennedy, Mary McMahon and Eileen Bell. The administrator, based in Peace House Belfast, was Jeff Maxwell. Harry Barnes was secretary of the group in London.

The Workers' Party played a central role in organising the initial Peace Train protest in October 1989. Its supporters participated alongside representatives of other political parties, with Proinsias De Rossa and Seamus Lynch among those travelling on 28 October.

== Train journeys ==
The organisation organised a Peace Train from Dublin to Belfast - an actual train hired out for the day which brought hundreds of people across the border from all over Ireland as a symbolic gesture to protest the bombing of the railway line. The group marched to Belfast City Hall where an open-air rally was held. The event was not without incident however as a window was broken by a stone-throwing youth and the train was held up by another bomb scare on the line at Portadown.

A number of further Peace Train events were held, including a large rally at Oriel Park football ground in Dundalk, Co. Louth. Peace Train passengers travelled from Belfast to Dublin, then on to London to highlight the issue at national level, with a rally addressed by Sam McAughtry, Chris Hudson and IRA torture victim Maurice Healy. There was also a meeting in Parliament Buildings hosted by Harry Barnes MP and Gary Kent.

A total of seven trains travelled between Dublin and Belfast from 1991 to 1995 and one from Holyhead to London in June 1991.

== Criticism ==
It was derided as being a Workers Party PR-stunt by many republicans in Sinn Féin and Fianna Fáil. Danny Morrison had denounced the trains as a 'stunt' and wrote a letter from the H-block to the Irish Times condemning the 'smugness, aloofness and hypocrisy' of the associated peace rallies. Mitchell McLaughlin described it to the Christian Science Monitor as "a lost opportunity for placing real peace on the political agenda".
