= Seán Garland =

Irish republican turned Marxist (1934–2018)

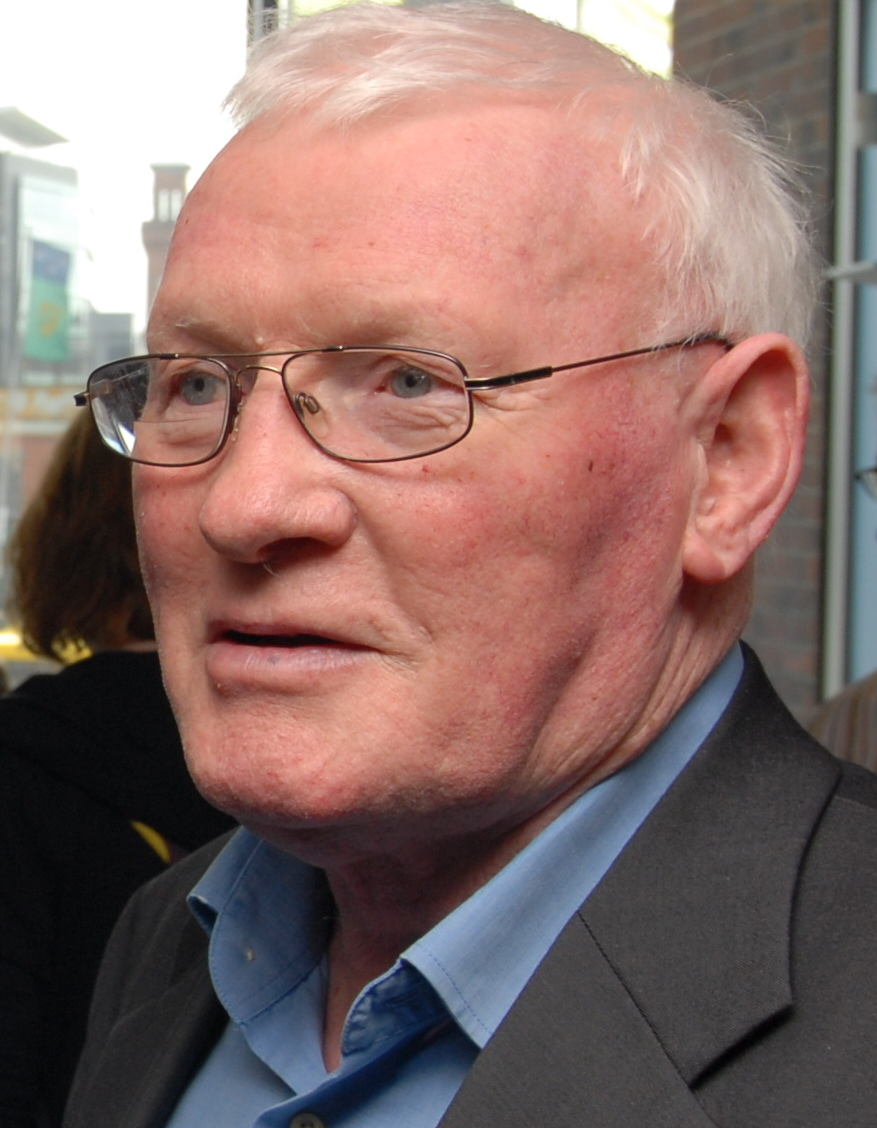
- Garland in 2008

General Secretary of the Workers' Party
- In office 1977–1991
- Preceded by: Máirín de Burca and Seán Ó Cionnaith (joint tenure)
- Succeeded by: Des Geraghty

President of the Workers' Party
- In office 2000–2008
- Succeeded by: Mick Finnegan
- Preceded by: Tom French

Personal details
- Born: 7 March 1934 Mountjoy Square, Dublin, Ireland
- Died: 13 December 2018 (aged 84) Navan, County Meath, Ireland
- Party: Workers' Party (from 1969)
- Other political affiliations: Sinn Féin (until 1969)

Military service
- Branch/service: Irish Republican Army (1953–1969); Official IRA (1969–unknown)
- Rank: Adjutant General (1969–1976) Chief of Staff (from 1976)
- Battles/wars: Border Campaign; The Troubles

Seán Garland (7 March 1934 – 13 December 2018) was the General Secretary of the Workers' Party in Ireland from 1977 to 1991, and President from 2000 to 2008.

== Early life ==
Born at Belvedere Place, off Mountjoy Square in Dublin, Garland joined the Irish Republican Army in 1953. In 1954, he briefly joined the British Army as an IRA agent and collected intelligence on Gough Barracks in Armagh and supplied it to the IRA in Dublin. This enabled the IRA to carry out a successful arms raid on 12 June 1954, with Garland's active involvement on the base. Garland deserted from the British Army in October of the same year, before his regiment was due to depart for Kenya. He became a full-time IRA training officer.

On 1 January 1957 at the beginning of the IRA Border Campaign, he led the unsuccessful attack on Brookeborough Royal Ulster Constabulary barracks in which his associates Seán South and Fergal O'Hanlon, both the subjects of well-known republican ballads, were shot and fatally wounded. Under fire, Garland carried South on his shoulders in an unsuccessful attempt to save his friend's life. Seriously wounded, he was subsequently hospitalised for a number of weeks and was then jailed in Mountjoy Prison. In November 1957, while in Mountjoy, Garland was an unsuccessful candidate in the Dublin North-Central by-election. Upon his release, he was interned in the Curragh, but was released in 1959.

Garland returned to IRA service on his release and was sent to Belfast to liaise with the largely inactive units in the city. He was arrested while trying to return to Dublin and sentenced in November 1959 to four years in Crumlin Road Gaol where he subsequently became officer commanding (O.C.) of the IRA prisoners.

== From Sinn Féin to the Workers' Party ==
In the 1960s, Garland became a Marxist and was one of a generation of IRA leaders who attempted to lead the organisation away from violence and into left-wing political agitation. He worked closely in this with figures such as Cathal Goulding and Tomás MacGiolla. During the 1969/70 IRA split, Garland supported the moves to abandon abstentionism and was a key figure in Official Sinn Féin (as national organiser) and Official Irish Republican Army (as Adjutant-General). The Official IRA was openly involved in shootings and bombings of military and civilian targets but declared a ceasefire in May 1972. Despite this, the Official IRA continued to carry out shootings and robberies during the 1970s and was engaged in a number of feuds with the Provisional IRA and the Irish National Liberation Army (INLA).

On 1 March 1975 in Ballymun, Dublin, Garland survived an INLA assassination attempt while returning home with his wife Mary to his Ballymun home. He was badly wounded in the attack. In 1977, Garland was elected general secretary of Official Sinn Féin. In the same year, he successfully proposed that the party be renamed Sinn Féin the Workers Party. In 1982, he proposed that the prefix Sinn Féin be dropped from the party name to become simply the Workers' Party.

In 1999 Garland was allegedly observed visiting the North Korean embassy in Moscow. It was subsequently alleged that he visited to collect forged U.S. dollars which, with the help of associates, would be transported to Dublin and Birmingham where the notes would be exchanged for pounds or authentic dollars. The US authorities announced that this scheme, which they said involved several international crime syndicates and transactions worth millions of dollars, had been uncovered in "Operation Mali".

Garland was the Workers' Party representative at the National Forum on Europe. In 2000, he was elected president of the Workers' Party.

== Involvement with KGB ==
In 1988 Sean Garland asked the KGB to provide "special training" to up to five members of the Workers' Party in order to improve party security. This request was made through the KGB station chief in Dublin, with whom Garland had "confidential contacts". The Chairman of the KGB, Vladimir Kryuchkov, viewed the request positively. However, on 12 January 1989, the International Department of the Central Committee of the Communist Party of the Soviet Union turned it down, fearing that leaked news of such cooperation would damage the Soviet relationship with the United Kingdom. Copies of Kryuchkov's letter and of the Central Committee decision can be found in an archive of classified documents smuggled out of Russia by Vladimir Bukovsky.

== Extradition fight ==
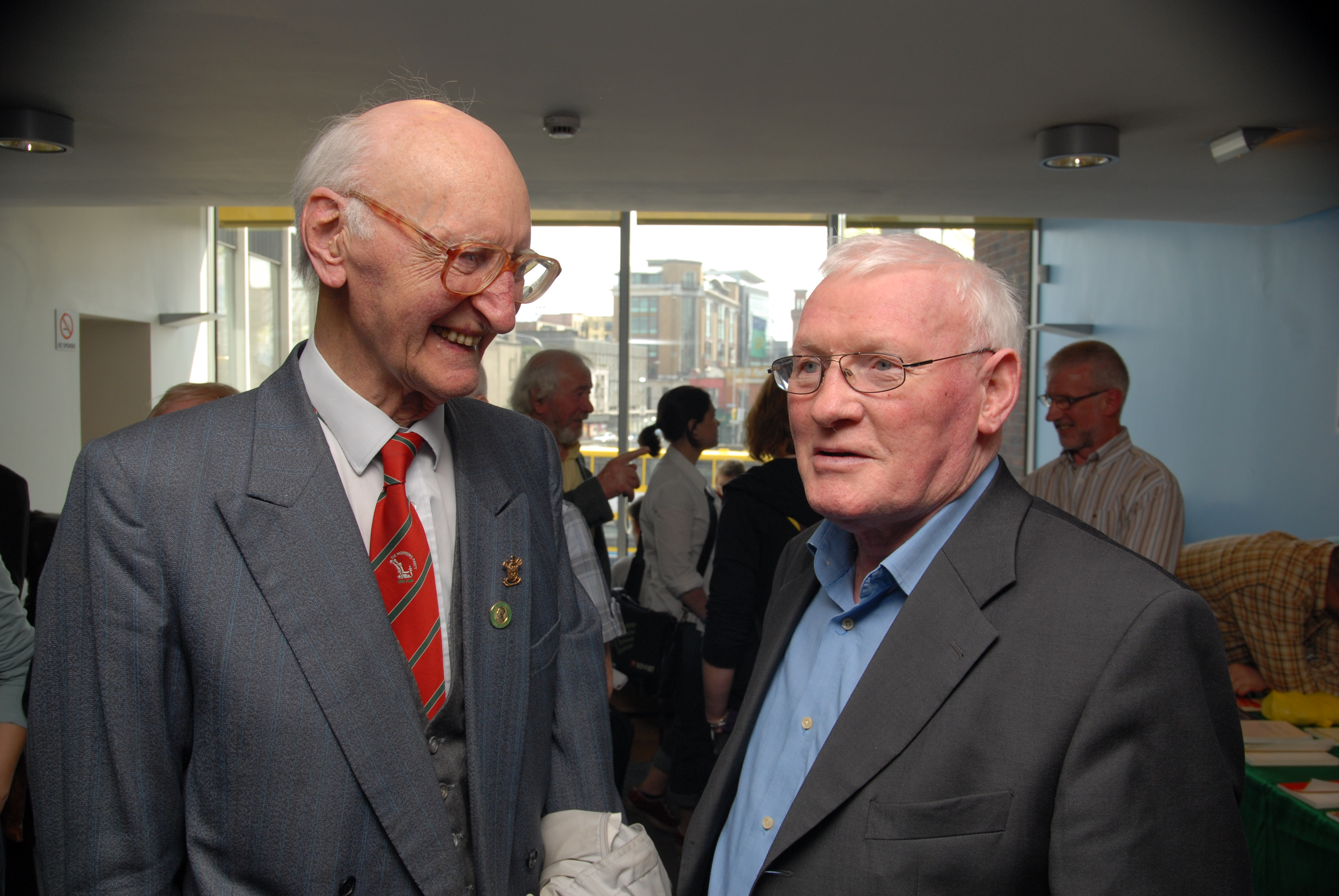
Seán Garland (right) with Tomás MacGiolla, May 2008

On 7 October 2005, Garland was arrested in Belfast by British Special Air Service following an extradition application issued by U.S. authorities. He had been attending the Workers' Party Ardfheis/Annual Conference at the time. The United States authorities alleged that Garland had been involved in the distribution and resale of counterfeited U.S. dollars – so-called "superdollars" or "supernotes" – in 1998 in Belarus, the Czech Republic, Denmark, the UK, Ireland, Poland, and Russia. They also alleged that the source of the banknotes was the government of North Korea. Garland was released on bail.

A campaign was then launched against the U.S. extradition attempt. His supporters claimed the U.S. waited for Garland to travel north of the Irish border before seeking his extradition, believing the United Kingdom authorities would be more willing to acquiesce than those in Ireland.

On 9 October 2005, a Sunday Times article alleged that Garland became chief of staff of the largely inactive Official IRA in 1998.

On 1 December, the High Court in Belfast issued a warrant for Garland's arrest after he failed to appear for an extradition hearing. On 1 April 2006, Garland was unanimously re-elected as President of The Workers' Party and in a keynote address to the party membership gathered in Dublin, he vowed to fight any attempt to extradite him to the United States. In 2008 he announced his intention to retire from the presidency and was replaced in the position on 17 May 2008 by Mick Finnegan. Garland remained a member of the party's Central Executive Committee and was its National Treasurer.

Garland was subsequently arrested in Dublin in 2009 and the application by the U.S. to extradite him was heard in 2011.

The campaign against his extradition continued, bringing in a number of prominent individuals from outside the Workers' Party including its Honorary Chairman Chris Hudson. It sought and received support from numerous political figures from across the spectrum in Ireland, Great Britain and further afield. Among these were dozens of members of the Oireachtas (Irish Parliament), MEPs and local politicians. Garland also received support from the entertainment industry including musicians Pete Seeger, Christy Moore, Alabama 3 and John Spillane. Garland's supporters pointed out that the 77-year-old had been diagnosed with a number of serious medical conditions including diabetes and bowel cancer.

On 21 December 2011, Justice John A. Edwards in the High Court dismissed the U.S. application for Garland's extradition. Justice Edwards told the court he was not disposed to grant the application and would furnish his reasons for doing so later.

On 27 January 2012, Justice Edwards stated that since the offence for which the U.S. wanted to extradite was regarded as having been committed in Ireland the Court was prohibited from extraditing Garland. He was therefore obliged to refer the case to the Director of Public Prosecutions who would consider whether there was a case for prosecuting Garland in Ireland.

On 29 May 2012, Garland spoke at the funeral of his comrade Noel Cullen, alongside Cullen's son Jake. Noel Cullen was a key figure in The Workers Party who died of cancer at the age of 52. Garland spoke on his friend's passion, humanity, and quest for knowledge before handing Jake and Noel's daughter Ríona a starry plough, and an Irish flag.

== Death ==
Garland died from cancer at his home at Kentstown near Navan, County Meath on 13 December 2018, aged 84.

He was waked at both the Official-linked Lower Falls Social Club on the Falls Road in Belfast, and at Liberty Hall in Dublin. His funeral later took place at Glasnevin Cemetery. Then-party President Michael Donnelly, former leader Tom French, and Dublin City Councillor Mannix Flynn were in attendance at the funeral.

== Works ==
- Ireland and the Socialist Countries (1986)
- Cathal Goulding: Thinker, Socialist, Republican, Revolutionary, 1923 - 1998 (1999)

== Sources ==
- Hanley, Brian, and Millar, Scott (2009). The Lost Revolution: The Story of the Official IRA and the Workers' Party. Dublin: Penguin Ireland.

Party political offices
Preceded by Máirín de Búrca?	General Secretary of the Workers' Party; 1977–1991	Succeeded by Des Geraghty
Preceded by Tom French	President of the Workers' Party; 2000–2008	Succeeded by Mick Finnegan
