= The Company You Keep (Alison Brown album) =

Studio album by Alison Brown
- Released: 2009
- Genre: Jazz
- Label: Compass
- Producer: Garry West

Alison Brown chronology
Evergreen (2008)	The Company You Keep (2009)

The Company You Keep is an album by American banjoist Alison Brown, released in 2009. The other members of the Quartet, especially pianist John Burr contribute to Brown's compositions more than on any of her previous albums, where she composed mostly on her own.

== Reception ==
Professional ratings
Review scores
Source	Rating
All About Jazz	5/5 stars
AllMusic	4/5 stars
The Music Box	4/5 stars

In his AllMusic review, Rick Anderson wrote that "her jazziest material sounds effortless and natural, but she also has no compunction whatsoever about bringing bluegrass and Celtic elements into her sound. On The Company You Keep she is playing and writing at the peak of her powers... "Drawing Down the Moon" is a slightly overlong slow number that tends to meander a bit, but it's the closest thing there is to a misstep on this excellent album."

Steve Morgan of The Louisville Music News writes, "First off, this is not a bluegrass CD. Even though there is a banjo on the cover, bluegrass is but a sliver of what is happening on this album. In fact, Brown's longtime ensemble of John Burr (piano), Joe Craven (mandolin, fiddle, & percussion) and husband Garry West (bass), along with several notable guests, have crafted a record which draws just as freely from rock and jazz as it does from bluegrass."

Ian Perry of Banjo Newsletter said, "Alison Brown’s latest release, The Company You Keep, once again showcases both Alison’s writing skills and her formidable chops, clearly maintaining her place amongst the leading voices in progressive jazz-oriented banjo today."

John Metzger of The Music Box commented, "With The Company You Keep, Brown has ushered another freewheeling showcase to fruition, though this time, it comes together so naturally that even those who aren't already in awe of her fleet-fingered abilities will have to pay attention."

C. Michael Bailey of All About Jazz wrote, "The discovery of a previously unknown species is a watershed event in the biological sciences. The discovery (or recognition) of the same in music is an equal watershed. Banjoist Alison Brown's The Company You Keep marks such a musical event."

Larry Stephens of Country Standard Time wrote, "While this is a banjo player's recording, it's clear it is intended as an ensemble that features the banjo, not a banjo-heavy record. The interweaving of instruments keeps each song fresh with new interludes always around the corner."

== Track listing ==
No.	Title	Writer(s)	Length
1.	"Crazy Ivan"	Alison Brown; John Burr; John Doyle	3:23
2.	"Rocket Summer"	Burr	5:24
3.	"The Road West"	Máirtín O'Connor	5:30
4.	"Drawing Down the Moon"	Brown; Garry West	5:30
5.	"Under the (Five) Wire"	Brown; Burr	4:01
6.	"Rain of Shine"	Brown; Burr	3:36
7.	"Over Nine Waves"	Brown; Doyle	4:20
8.	"Forky on the Water"	Brown; Burr; Joe Craven	5:05
9.	"The Clean Plate Club"	Brown; Burr	2:57
10.	"Waltz for Mr. B"	Brown; Burr	3:01

== Personnel ==
- Alison Brown – banjo, guitar
- John Burr – piano
- Garry West – bass
- Larry Atamanuik – drums
- Joe Craven – violin, mandolin, percussion
- John Doyle – guitar, lute
- Stuart Duncan – violin
- Joe Craven – fiddle, mandolin, percussion

== Charts ==
Chart (2009)	Peak position
US Bluegrass Albums (Billboard)	8
