= Alison Brown =

American musician (born 1962)

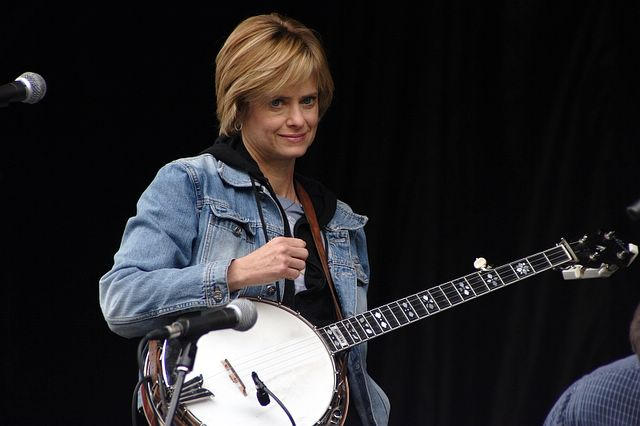
- Brown in 2006

Background information
- Born: August 7, 1962 (age 64)
- Origin: Hartford, Connecticut, U.S.
- Genres: Bluegrass, Americana, jazz
- Occupations: Songwriter, musician, Record Producer
- Instruments: Banjo, guitar
- Years active: 1978–present
- Labels: Vanguard Records, Compass Records, Ridge Runner Records
- Website: alisonbrown.com

Alison Brown (born August 7, 1962) is an American banjo player, guitarist, composer, and producer. She has won and has been nominated for several Grammy awards and is often compared to another banjo prodigy, Béla Fleck, for her unique style of playing. In her music, she blends bluegrass, jazz, Latin and Celtic influences.

== Early life ==
Born in Hartford, Connecticut, Brown learned to play guitar at eight and banjo at ten. When she was twelve, she met fiddler Stuart Duncan. In the summer of 1978, Brown traveled across the country with Duncan and his father, playing at festivals and contests. She won first place at the Canadian National Banjo Championship, which helped her land a one-night gig at the Grand Ole Opry.

== Family ==
She is married to bass player Garry West. She has a daughter, Hannah West, and a son, Brendan West.

== Harvard University and Northern Lights ==
In 1980, Brown went to Harvard University, where she studied history and literature. After graduating from Harvard, she earned an MBA from UCLA.

In 1982, while still at Harvard, Brown helped to reunite the Northern Lights band after a five-year hiatus, she became a band member until 1984, when she moved back to California. Brown worked for two years with Smith Barney in San Francisco, and then took a break to pursue her music interests.

== Union Station and other collaborations ==
In 1987, Alison Krauss asked Brown to join her band, Union Station. Brown spent three years with Krauss. In 1990, she moved to Tennessee, and was named International Bluegrass Music Association Banjo Player of the Year in 1991, the first female in the IBMA's history to win an instrumental of the year award. The 1990 album I've Got That Old Feeling, on which Brown played banjo, won a Grammy award.

In 1992, Brown became the band leader for Michelle Shocked. This experience led Brown to merge bluegrass with jazz and folk idioms, in a manner similar to those of Béla Fleck and David Grisman.

== Compass Records ==
In the early 1990s, Brown and her husband, bass player Garry West, started their own record label, Small World Music. This company eventually led to the launch of Compass Records in 1995, an internationally recognized label, which has such artists as Victor Wooten, Colin Hay, A.J. Croce, Glen Phillips, Robbie Fulks, Bobby Osborne, Altan, Darol Anger, Elizabeth & the Catapult and others.

In 2006, The Compass Records Group acquired the rights to the Green Linnet catalog and the next year acquired the seminal Dublin-based Irish music label Mulligan records. These two acquisitions made Compass Records Group the leading label for Irish and Celtic music. In 2017, Compass acquired Red House Records, the St. Paul, MN based folk and Americana label started by Bob Feldman in 1983, bring artists including Greg Brown, The Wailin’ Jennys, John Gorka, Chastity Brown and Davina and the Vagabonds to the Compass Records Group. Since that time, Red House has added Steve Poltz, The Small Glories, The Whitmore Sisters and Kate Taylor to the roster.

== Grammy Awards ==
In 2001, in collaboration with Béla Fleck, Brown won the Grammy Award for Best Country Instrumental Performance for her song "Leaving Cottondale" from her album Fair Weather. She participated in Alison Krauss's Grammy-winning album I've Got That Old Feeling, and received a Grammy nomination for her own recording, Simple Pleasures (1990).

== Alison Brown and Quartet ==
Stolen Moments (2005), in Brown's estimation, was her most musically successful record to date. "For the first time, I feel like I've created a true hybrid sound that suggests its influences – bluegrass, jazz, Celtic music – but when taken as a whole isn't any one of these things." – Brown's words about the album on the group's official webpage. In 2007, Brown was honored as one of Irish America magazine's Stars of the South. Her 2009 album The Company You Keep continued her trend for mixing different acoustic genres.

Brown continues touring with her quartet internationally. As a famous Harvard University alumna, she was invited to play at the inauguration of Harvard's president Drew Faust. in 2007.

In 2015, Brown received the Distinguished Achievement Award from the International Bluegrass Music Association for the furtherance of bluegrass music.

In 2025, Brown collaborated with comedian and banjo player Steve Martin on the single "Five Days Out, Two Days Back".

== Record producer ==
Brown is also a record producer, helming projects for artists such as Dale Ann Bradley, and The Special Consensus.

Selective production credits

- Dale Ann Bradley - Catch Tomorrow (2006)
- Dale Ann Bradley - Don't Turn Your Back (2009)
- Peter Rowan & Nashville Bluegrass Band - Legacy (2010)
- Dale Ann Bradley - Somewhere South of Crazy (2011)
- The Special Consensus - Scratch Gravel Road (2012)
- The Special Consensus - Country Boy: A Bluegrass Tribute to John Denver (2014)
- The Special Consensus - Long I Ride (2016)
- Claire Lynch - North by South (2016)
- Quiles & Cloud - Shake Me Now (2017)
- Bobby Osborne - Original (2017)
- The Special Consensus - Rivers and Roads (2018)
- Frank Solivan & Dirty Kitchen - If You Can't Stand the Heat (2019)
- The Special Consensus - Chicago Barn Dance (2020)

== Discography ==
=== Ridge Runner Records ===
- Pre-Sequel (1981) with Stuart Duncan

=== Vanguard Records ===
- Simple Pleasures (1990)
- Twilight Motel (1992)
- Look Left (1994)
- Quartet (1996)
- Best of the Vanguard Years (2002)
- Vanguard Visionaries (2007)

=== Compass Records ===
- Out of the Blue (1998)
- Fair Weather (2000)
- Replay (2002)
- Stolen Moments (2005)
- Evergreen (2008)
- The Company You Keep (2009)
- The Song of the Banjo (2015)
- On Banjo (2023)
