= Vanguard Visionaries (Alison Brown album) =

Compilation album by Alison Brown
- Released: 2007
- Genre: Progressive Bluegrass, Jazz
- Label: Vanguard
- Producer: Gary West

Alison Brown chronology
Stolen Moments (2005)	Vanguard Visionaries (2007)	Evergreen (2008)

Vanguard Visionaries is a compilation album by American banjoist Alison Brown, released in 2007.

== History ==
Vanguard Records played a significant role in the 1960s folk revival, releasing music by many influential folk artists, including Doc Watson, Odetta, John Fahey and many others. To commemorate their 60th anniversary, Vanguard released a series of artist samplers titled Vanguard Visionaries.

Professional ratings
Review scores
Source	Rating
Allmusic	3.5/5 stars

== Track listing ==
All compositions by Alison Brown unless otherwise noted

1. "Leaving Cottondale" – 2:32
2. "Simple Pleasures" – 2:51
3. "Wolf Moon" – 2:52
4. "Shoot the Dog" – 3:24
5. "Chicken Road" – 4:28
6. "View from Above" – 4:54
7. "Look Left" – 5:00
8. "Cara's Way" – 5:18
9. "G Bop (Brown, Burr, Reed, West)" – 3:08
10. "Without Anastasia" – 3:13

== Personnel ==
- Alison Brown – banjo, guitar
- Garry West – bass
- John R. Burr – piano
- Rick Reed – drums, percussion
