= Twilight Motel =

Studio album by Alison Brown
- Released: 1992
- Genres: Progressive bluegrass, jazz
- Length: 42:49
- Label: Vanguard
- Producer: Mike Marshall

Alison Brown chronology
Simple Pleasures (1990)	Twilight Motel (1992)	Look Left (1994)

Twilight Motel is an album by the American banjoist Alison Brown, released in 1992. Brown used a 1938 Gibson banjo.

== Production ==
Recorded in Nashville and in Berkeley, the album was produced by Mike Marshall. "Sweet Thames Flow Softly" is a cover of the Ewan MacColl song.

== Reception ==
Professional ratings
Review scores
Source	Rating
AllMusic	4.5/5 stars
Chicago Tribune	3/4 stars
The Indianapolis Star	2.5/4 stars

The Baltimore Sun wrote that the album "touches on everything from slippery samba rhythms to flashy Scruggs-style picking." The Indianapolis Star concluded that "there's nothing bad on this disc, much that's good, but too much that's merely pleasant, veering close to 'easy listening'." Stereo Review noted that "Brown never wanders as far into space-grass territory as Bela Fleck, but her artistic vision, while less flashy, is no less profound."

In his AllMusic review, music critic Michael McCall called the album "jazzier, yet also more relaxed, than her debut."

== Track listing ==
All compositions by Alison Brown unless otherwise noted

1. "First Light" – 5:17
2. "Lorelei" – 4:36
3. "Twilight Motel" – 3:45
4. "Blue Marlin" – 4:40
5. "Saint Geneviéve" – 4:02
6. "Gods of Brazil" – 4:29
7. "Shoot the Dog" – 3:25
8. "Pelican Bay" – 3:12
9. "Chicken Road" – 4:25
10. "Sweet Thames Flow Softly (MacCall, MacColl)" – 5:24

== Personnel ==
- Alison Brown – banjo, guitar
- Roy Huskey Jr. – bass
- Stuart Duncan – violin
- Matt Eakle – flute
- Jerry Douglas – dobro
- Darol Anger – violin
- Mike Marshall – guitar, mandolin
- Todd Philips – bass
- Mark Schatz – banjo, bass
- Scott Nygaard – guitar
- Maura O'Conell – vocals
- Tony Rice – guitar
- Michael Spiro – percussion
- Paul VanWageningen – drums
- Garry West – bass
- Kristin Wilkinson – viola
- Andrea Zonn - violin
- David Hoffner – piano, keyboards
- Tom Miller – drums, steel pan
- John Catchings – violoncello
