= Fair Weather (album) =

Studio album by Alison Brown
- Released: 2000
- Genres: Progressive Bluegrass, Jazz
- Length: 39:46
- Label: Compass
- Producer: Garry West

Alison Brown chronology
| Out of the Blue (1998) | Fair Weather (2000) | Replay (2002) |

Professional ratings
Review scores
| Source | Rating |
|---|---|
| Allmusic | 4/5 stars |

Fair Weather is album by American banjoist Alison Brown, released in 2000.

At the 43rd Grammy Awards Brown and Béla Fleck won the Grammy Award for Best Country Instrumental Performance for "Leaving Cottondale".

Guests include Stuart Duncan, Darol Anger, Vince Gill and Tony Rice.

== Reception ==
In his Allmusic review, music critic Rick Anderson wrote that Brown "returns to her bluegrass roots on this beautiful and exhilarating album. Well, sort of... much of this is bluegrass music of a type that Bill Monroe might not recognize... The album's most thrilling moments come on the complex and exhilarating "Leaving Cottondale," which is both one of the prettiest and one of the most technically impressive of Brown's compositions. Here she's joined by fellow banjo maverick Bela Fleck for one of the most jaw-dropping passages of twin-banjo counterpoint ever put on tape. Call it bluegrass, call it newgrass, call it jazzgrass, whatever. This is one of the best albums of 2000 in any genre."

Ian Perry of Banjo NewsLetter writes of the title track "Fair Weather was written by Steve Libbea (brother of Nashville Bluegrass Band bassist Gene Libbea), who died in a plane crash. Alison, along with vocalist Vince Gill and Gene Libbea who also appear on the cut, offer this version of Steve's song as a tribute, making the whole performance that much more heartfelt and meaningful."

Chet Williamson of Rambles.net writes "The music is great, from the blazing hot opener, "Late on Arrival," to "Sweet Thing," the banjo solo that wraps things up. There are a lot of highlights in between. The title track is a Vince Gill showcase, proving that he can still play mighty fine lead guitar as well as sing magnificently."

== Track listing ==
All tracks are written by Alison Brown, unless otherwise noted.

| No. | Title | Writer(s) | Length |
|---|---|---|---|
| 1. | "Late on Arrival" | | 2:28 |
| 2. | "Fair Weather" (with Vince Gill and Gene Libbea) | | 3:00 |
| 3. | "Poe's Pickin' Party" | | 3:41 |
| 4. | "Every Day I Write the Book" | Elvis Costello | 3:25 |
| 5. | "The Devil Went Down to Berkeley" | | 4:19 |
| 6. | "Hummingbird" | Mark "Boo" Hewerdine | 3:51 |
| 7. | "Girl's Breakdown" | | 3:39 |
| 8. | "Everybody's Talkin'" | Fred Neil | 3:42 |
| 9. | "Deep Gap" | | 3:49 |
| 10. | "Shake and Howdy" | | 3:09 |
| 11. | "Leaving Cottondale" | | 3:06 |
| 12. | "Sweet Thing" | | 1:37 |
| Total length: | | | 39:46 |

- Track information taken from the album's liner notes.

== Personnel ==
- Alison Brown – banjo, guitar
- Béla Fleck – banjo
- John Burr – piano, keyboards
- Rick Reed – drums
- Garry West – bass
- Sam Bush – mandolin, lead vocal (4)
- Stuart Duncan – fiddle
- Darol Anger – fiddle
- Garth Fundis – vocals
- Claire Lynch - lead vocal (6)
- Vince Gill – guitar, vocals
- David Grier – guitar
- Tim O'Brien – mandolin, lead vocal (8)
- Tony Rice – guitar
- Mike Marshall – guitar, mandolin
- Todd Phillips – bass
- Missy Raines – bass
