= Replay (Alison Brown album) =

Studio album by Alison Brown
- Released: 2002
- Genre: Progressive Bluegrass, Jazz
- Label: Compass
- Producer: Garry West

Alison Brown chronology
Fair Weather (2000)	Replay (2002)	Best of the Vanguard Years (2002)

Replay is album by American banjoist Alison Brown, released in 2002.

== Reception ==
Professional ratings
Review scores
Source	Rating
Allmusic	4/5 stars

In his Allmusic review, music critic Ronnie D. Lankford, Jr. wrote that of the album; "One may not be able to please all of the fans all of the time, but Replay should please most of Alison Brown's fans most of the time. The Alison Brown Quartet distinguish themselves from competitors by building a solid musical framework and taking flight from there."

== Track listing ==
All compositions by Alison Brown unless otherwise noted

1. "Red Balloon" – 2:59
2. "Lorelei" – 3:22
3. "Late on Arrival" – 2:18
4. "Daytime TV" – 2:58
5. "My Favorite Marsha" – 4:14
6. "Spiderman Theme" (Perry) – 4:09
7. "The Wonderful Sea Voyage" (Brown, West) – 4:18
8. "Without Anastasia" – 3:02
9. "The Inspector" – 2:24
10. "Chicken Road" – 4:31
11. "G Bop" (Brown, Burr, Reed, West) – 2:56
12. "Étouffée Brutus ?" – 3:48
13. "Shoot the Dog" – 3:06
14. "Mambo Banjo" – 3:49
15. "The Promise of Spring" – 3:23

== Personnel ==
- Alison Brown – banjo, guitar
- John Burr - piano
- Kendrick Freeman - drums
- Garry West - bass
