= Mick Finnegan =

Irish communist politician

Mick Finnegan is a former president of the Workers' Party. He was elected to that position on 17 May 2008 at the party's Annual Conference and retired in 2014.

Finnegan is originally from near Bailieborough, County Cavan, but has spent most of his life in Dublin. He worked for many years in the construction industry in both Great Britain and Ireland and was a shop steward in the Dublin Construction Branch of the Irish Transport and General Workers Union (now SIPTU), before becoming a full-time branch official.

Finnegan was for many years the Workers' Party director of elections in Dublin West on behalf of then party President Tomás Mac Giolla. He contested the 1981 Irish general election for the party (then known as Sinn Féin The Workers Party) in Dublin West, polling 0.7%, as a second candidate to Mac Giolla who was to be elected in the constituency in the November 1982 general election and the 2007 general election in Dublin Mid-West, polling 0.98%. Finnegan also unsuccessfully contested the 1999 Irish local elections, polling 3.4% of the vote and the 2009 local elections in the Lucan electoral area, polling 4.6% of the vote.

Party political offices
Preceded by Seán Garland	President of the Workers' Party; 2008–2014	Succeeded by Michael Donnelly
