= Out of the Blue (Alison Brown album) =

Studio album by Alison Brown
- Released: 1998
- Genre: Progressive bluegrass, jazz
- Length: 40:44
- Label: Compass
- Producer: Garry West

Alison Brown chronology
Quartet (1996)	Out of the Blue (1998)	Fair Weather (2000)

Out of the Blue is album by American banjoist Alison Brown, released in 1998.

== Reception ==
Professional ratings
Review scores
Source	Rating
AllMusic	3/5 stars

In his AllMusic review, Charlotte Dylan wrote of the album, "The music on this album is bluegrass flavored with a little jazz. Fans won't notice anything untried or bold here from Alison Brown, but there are a number of good songs on this album..."

Writing for No Depression, Rachel Leibrock felt the album was restrained and called it "a cocktail-hour fusion of jazz, Latin and Caribbean rhythms.. a sparkling and crisp arrangement of unassuming instrumentals, but they never fully hook the listener... Dispassionate and cool, the record is too pristine and orderly to burn itself into a more emotional listening sphere."

== Track listing ==
All compositions by Alison Brown unless otherwise noted

1. "Out of the Blue" – 5:45
2. "Dantes' Paradise" – 3:35
3. "Coast Walk" – 3:58
4. "Four for Launch" – 3:11
5. "Road to Corossol" (Brown, Burr, West) – 4:46
6. "Mood Ring" (Brown, West) – 5:11
7. "Samba del Sol" – 3:39
8. "Sands of Sound" – 3:59
9. "Return to Pelican bay" – 3:44
10. "Rebel's Bolero" – 2:56

== Personnel ==
- Alison Brown – banjo, guitar
- John Burr – piano, keyboards
- Rick Reed – drums
- Garry West – bass
