= Simple Pleasures (Alison Brown album) =

Studio album by Alison Brown
- Released: 1990
- Genre: Progressive Bluegrass, Jazz
- Length: 38:55
- Label: Vanguard
- Producer: David Grisman

Alison Brown chronology
Simple Pleasures (1990)	Twilight Motel (1992)

Simple Pleasures is an album by American banjoist Alison Brown, released in 1990. Produced by David Grisman and recorded with his David Grisman Quintet plus such stars as Mike Marshall, Alison Krauss and Turtle Island String Quartet violoncellist Mark Summer, this jazzy album delivers a hybrid-string sound with all tracks exclusively written by Alison Brown.

== Reception ==
Professional ratings
Review scores
Source	Rating
Allmusic	4.5/5 stars

In his Allmusic review, music critic Michael McCall wrote of the album "Her all-instrumental debut instantly earned respect among progressive acoustic music fans... she maintains an innate elegance amid the tricky arranging."

== Track listing ==
All compositions by Alison Brown

1. "Mambo Banjo" – 3:58
2. "Leaving Cottondale" – 2:35
3. "Fantasy" – 2:25
4. "Daytime TV" – 3:02
5. "Wolf Moon" – 2:50
6. "From the Coast" – 5:13
7. "Weetabix" – 2:42
8. "Bright And Early" – 2:45
9. "Waltzing With Tula" – 3:01
10. "Reddy Rooster" – 2:43
11. "Sundaze" – 4:52
12. "Simple Pleasures" – 2:49

== Personnel ==
- Alison Brown – banjo, guitar
- Joe Craven – percussion
- David Grisman – mandolin
- Matt Eakle – flute
- Jim Kerwin– bass
- Alison Krauss – fiddle
- Mike Marshall – guitar
- Mark Summer – cello
