= Look Left (Ireland) =

LookLeft
- Categories: Political magazine
- Frequency: Bi-monthly
- Publisher: Citizen Press Ltd.
- First issue: 2006
- Company: The Workers' Party
- Country: Ireland
- Based in: Dublin
- Language: English
- Website: lookleft.org

LookLeft is an Irish left-wing political magazine and online publication associated with the Workers' Party. It began publication in 2006 and was relaunched in 2010 as a bi-monthly general political-interest magazine.

== History and profile ==
LookLeft began publication in 2006 as a Workers' Party publication. The Irish Left Archive holds a March 2009 issue, listed as volume 4, number 1. In March 2010, the magazine was relaunched in a broader format. The relaunched magazine formed part of a Workers' Party media strategy that combined a traditional political journal with online political engagement. It began as a party publication but later broadened its focus to include subjects such as popular culture and sport, as well as contributors from outside the party. It was a features-based magazine aligned with the Workers' Party, sharing republican and left-wing roots while attempting to broaden its perspective towards global issues. Its print runs were 5,000 or fewer, and it was distributed through Eason's in Ireland and political bookshops in Britain. Issues from 2010 and 2011 were archived by Magill/Politico.ie. In 2013, The Cedar Lounge Revolution described a 48-page issue of the magazine as available in Eason's stores and selected newsagents, and listed articles on austerity, the G8, the Good Friday Agreement, emigration, Venezuela, trade unions, culture and sport.

== Look Left Forum ==
In 2012, the Workers' Party proposed a Look Left Forum at a party conference in Northern Ireland. The proposal drew on the magazine's branding and was presented as an attempt to engage people and organisations interested in progressive and socialist politics, including possible co-operation around non-sectarian left-wing candidates.
