= Seamus Lynch =

Irish politician

Member of Belfast City Council
- In office 15 May 1985 – 19 May 1993
- Preceded by: District created
- Succeeded by: Joe Austin
- Constituency: Oldpark
- In office 18 May 1977 – 20 May 1981
- Preceded by: Samuel Millar
- Succeeded by: Fergus O'Hare
- Constituency: Belfast Area G

Personal details
- Born: 1945 (age 80–81) Belfast, Northern Ireland
- Party: Democratic Left (1992–1999); Workers' Party (1970–1992)
- Other political affiliations: Sinn Féin (1968–1970)

Seamus Lynch (born 1945) is a former Irish republican and socialist politician.

Born in North Belfast, Lynch became a republican activist around the start of The Troubles, and sided with the Official wing of Sinn Féin in the split of 1970. He was interned from October 1971 until the following year. He was a strong supporter of the Official IRA's ceasefire in 1972 and Official Sinn Féin's vocal socialism. As a result, he became active in the Republican Clubs movement, and stood for the organisation in Belfast North at the 1973 Northern Ireland Assembly election. He received only 1.7% of the first preference votes cast and was not elected. He stood again for the Northern Ireland Constitutional Convention, but his vote dropped to just 1.3%. He was elected to Belfast City Council in 1977, representing Area G, but lost his seat in 1981.

Lynch next stood in the Westminster seat of Belfast North at the 1979 general election, increasing his vote to 4.5%, the best result for Republican Clubs in Northern Ireland, and at the 1982 Northern Ireland Assembly election, he increased his share to 7.1%.

== Workers' Party ==
In 1982, Republican Clubs was renamed the Workers' Party and Lynch became its Northern Chairman and national Vice-President He then stood in the 1983 general election, receiving 5.7% of the vote, but did less well in the Northern Ireland-wide European Parliament election in 1984, taking only 1.3% and seventh position of eight candidates. He was re-elected to Belfast City Council in 1985, representing Oldpark, and held his seat in 1989.

Lynch's best result in a Westminster election came when he took 11.8% of the vote in a three-way contest in the 1986 Belfast North by-election. At the following year's general election, he dropped back to 8.3%. He also stood in the 1989 European election, placing eighth out of ten candidates.

== Democratic Left ==
In 1992, Lynch sided with the split from the Workers' Party which produced Democratic Left, and he became the new group's main figure in Northern Ireland. Standing for the new organisation, at the 1992 UK general election his vote fell to 3.7% and he lost his council seat the following year. His last contest for the party was heading its North Belfast list for the Northern Ireland Forum election in 1996, but the list took only 123 votes. Democratic Left dissolved in 1999, its members invited to join the Irish Labour Party but not permitted to organise in Northern Ireland.

In 2003, Lynch was elected Chairman of the North Belfast sub-group of the Belfast District Policing Partnership. He was Public Affairs Officer with Age NI until 2012. He now works as Public Affairs Manager for Age Sector Platform and is the Speaker of the Northern Ireland Pensioners Parliament.

Party political offices
Preceded by Malachy McGurran	Vice President of the Workers' Party; 1978–1992	Succeeded by ?
