= Stolen Moments (Alison Brown album) =

Studio album by Alison Brown
- Released: 2005
- Genre: Progressive bluegrass, jazz
- Label: Compass
- Producer: Garry West

Alison Brown chronology
| Best of the Vanguard Years (2002) | Stolen Moments (2005) | Vanguard Visionaries (2007) |

Stolen Moments is album by American banjoist Alison Brown, released in 2005.

Guest artists include Sam Bush, Mary Chapin Carpenter, Beth Nielsen Chapman, Stuart Duncan and Indigo Girls Amy Ray and Emily Saliers.

== Reception ==
Professional ratings
Review scores
| Source | Rating |
|---|---|
| AllMusic | 3.5/5 stars |

In his AllMusic review, Christopher Monger praised the album and wrote that "the most alluring piece appears at the end of Stolen Moments; the self-penned mandolin, conga, and banjo-driven "Musette for a Palindrome" is so unlike anything else on the record that one can only hope that it's merely a teaser for the next. More like this please."

Writing for No Depression, Robert L. Doerschuk compared Brown to Béla Fleck, summarizing the album as "one more step toward enlightenment, so that even the dimmest bulbs can understand why Brown’s similarities to Fleck — mainly, jaw-dropping virtuosity — are ultimately beside the point" and referred to Brown's aesthetic: "simple, eloquent, and fully original."

== Track listing ==
All compositions by Alison Brown unless otherwise noted

1. "The Sound of Summer Running" – 4:21
2. "The Magnificent Seven" (Brown, Doyle) – 3:53
3. "Homeward Bound" (Paul Simon) – 4:04
4. "The Pirate Queen" – 4:29
5. "Carrowkeel" – 3:59
6. "Angel" (Jimi Hendrix) main vocals by Beth Nielsen Chapman – 4:35
7. "McIntyre Heads South" (Brown, West) – 4:00
8. "One Morning in May" (Keith, Rooney) – 4:34
9. "(I'm Naked and I'm) Going to Glasgow" – 6:48
10. "Prayer Wheel" (Hewerdine) – 4:40
11. "Musette for a Palindrome" – 5:12

== Personnel ==
- Alison Brown – banjo, guitar
- Sam Bush – mandolin on The Magnificent Seven
- Mary Chapin Carpenter – vocals on Prayer Wheel
- Beth Nielsen Chapman – vocals on Angel
- John Doyle – guitar
- Stuart Duncan – fiddle on The Sound Of Summer Running
- Kenny Malone – drums
- Mike Marshall – guitar, mandolin
- Max E. Pad – piano
- Amy Ray – vocals on Homeward Bound
- Emily Saliers – vocals on Homeward Bound
- Garry West – bass
- Seamus Egan - low whistle on Carrowkeel
- Andrea Zonn - vocals on One Morning In May
