= Look Left (album) =

Studio album by Alison Brown
- Released: 1994
- Genre: Progressive Bluegrass, Jazz
- Length: 46:21
- Label: Vanguard
- Producer: Garry West

Alison Brown chronology
Twilight Motel (1992)	Look Left (1994)	Quartet (1996)

Look Left is album by American banjoist Alison Brown, released in 1994.

== Reception ==
Professional ratings
Review scores
Source	Rating
Allmusic	4/5 stars

In his Allmusic review, music critic Johnny Lofthus called the album "a cleanly played set that's as crisp as white sheets on a springtime clothesline."

== Track listing ==
All compositions by Alison Brown unless otherwise noted

1. "Étouffée Brutus?" – 3:16
2. "View From Above" – 4:52
3. "Look Left" – 4:59
4. "Rain Again" – 5:14
5. "The Red Earth" (Alison Brown, Garry West) – 6:01
6. "Deep North" – 5:38
7. "The Dalai Camel" – 5:38
8. "The Inspector" – 3:07
9. "Cara's Way/ (The Little People)" – 5:18
10. "Traveler's Rest" (Brown, West) – 2:18

== Personnel ==
- Alison Brown – banjo, guitar
- Paul McCandless – soprano sax
- Alan Dargin – digeridoo
- Joey Dukes – drums
- Matt Eakle – flute
- Mike Marshall – mandolin
- Scott Nygaard – guitar
- Garry West – bass
- Rick Reed – drums
- Bill Miller – flute, wooden floote
- John Burr – piano, keyboards
- Sam Bacco – percussion
- Joey Miskulin – accordion
- Seamus Egan – drums, pipe, whistle, penny whistle
- Jeff King – electric guitar
