= Best of the Vanguard Years (Alison Brown album) =

Greatest hits album by Alison Brown
- Released: 2002
- Genre: Progressive Bluegrass, Jazz
- Label: Vanguard
- Producer: Garry West, David Grisman

Alison Brown chronology
Replay (2002)	Best of the Vanguard Years (2002)	Stolen Moments (2005)

Professional ratings
Review scores
Source	Rating
Allmusic	4/5 stars

Best of the Vanguard Years is a compilation album by American banjoist Alison Brown, released in 2002.

== Track listing ==
All compositions by Alison Brown.

1. "Wolf Moon" – 2:54
2. "Chicken Road" – 4:27
3. "Without Anastasia" – 3:14
4. "Mambo Banjo" – 4:01
5. "Shoot the Dog" – 3:26
6. "Cara's Way" – 5:20
7. "G Bop" – 3:10
8. "Waltzing with Tula" – 3:04
9. "The Dalai Camel" – 5:41
10. "Deep North" – 5:40
11. "Saint Geneviève" – 4:03
12. "Leaving Cottondale" – 2:36
13. "Lorelei" – 4:38
14. "Look Left" – 5:02
15. "Hello Mendocino!" – 4:01
16. "The Inspector" – 3:08
17. "Simple Pleasures" – 2:51

== Personnel ==
- Alison Brown – banjo, guitar
- Garry West - bass
- John R. Burr - piano
- Rick Reed - drums, percussion

=== Guest musicians ===
- Vassar Clements - violin
- John Catchings - violoncello
- Joe Craven - percussion
- Tony Rice - guitar
- Scott Nygaard - guitar
- Alison Krauss - violin
- Roy M. Husky jr - bass
- Mike Marshall - guitar, mandolin
- Joey Dukes - drums
- Matt Eakle - flute
- Seamus Egan - penny whistle, uilleann pipes
- Sam Bacco - percussion, cowbell
- Alan Dargin - didjeridu
