= Workers' Party (Ireland) =

Irish political party

The Workers' Party Páirtí na nOibrithe
- President: Michael McCorry
- Founded: 28 November 1905; 120 years ago (original form); 17 January 1970; 56 years ago (current form)
- Preceded by: Official Sinn Féin (Note: The organisation was formally Sinn Féin at the time of the 1970 split. Official Sinn Féin was the distinguishing name used for the majority (Gardiner Place) faction; it later renamed itself Sinn Féin – The Workers' Party and then The Workers' Party.); Sinn Féin – The Workers' Party
- Headquarters: 8 Cabra Road, Dublin 7, Ireland
- Youth wing: Workers' Party Youth
- Ideology: Communism; Marxism–Leninism; Irish republicanism
- European affiliation: INITIATIVE (2013–2023)
- International affiliation: IMCWP; WAP
- Colours: Red

Website
- workersparty.ie

The Workers' Party (Irish: Páirtí na nOibrithe) is an Irish republican, Marxist–Leninist communist party active in both the Republic of Ireland and Northern Ireland.

The party can be considered a direct descendant of the original Sinn Féin organisation founded in 1905 by Arthur Griffith. It took its current form in 1970 following a division within Sinn Féin, in which the majority faction followed the leadership in a Marxist direction. It was known as Sinn Féin (Gardiner Place) or Official Sinn Féin, to distinguish it from the minority faction of "Sinn Féin (Kevin Street)" or "Provisional Sinn Féin". It changed its name from Sinn Féin to Sinn Féin The Workers' Party in 1977 and then to the Workers' Party in 1982. Both groups were tied to corresponding paramilitary groups, with Official Sinn Féin tied to the Official Irish Republican Army.

The party reached its electoral peak in the Republic of Ireland at the 1989 general election, winning seven TDs. In 1992, following disputes over ideology, party organisation and alleged links to the Official IRA, six of its seven TDs left to form Democratic Left, which merged with the Labour Party in 1999. The continuing Workers' Party retained its Marxist–Leninist orientation. It has since operated on a smaller scale, retaining local representation for periods but failing to regain representation in Dáil Éireann. A further split occurred in 2021, when a group led by Ted Tynan broke away and continued using the Workers' Party name.

== Name ==
In 1971, it registered to contest Dáil and local elections in the Republic of Ireland under the name Sinn Féin. From the early to mid-1970s, it was known as Official Sinn Féin or Sinn Féin (Gardiner Place) to distinguish it from the rival offshoot Provisional Sinn Féin, or Sinn Féin (Kevin Street). Gardiner Place had symbolic power as the headquarters of Sinn Féin for decades before the 1970 split.

At its Ardfheis in January 1977, Official Sinn Féin renamed itself Sinn Féin – The Workers' Party. Its first seats in Dáil Éireann were won under this new name. A motion at the 1979 Ardfheis to remove the Sinn Féin prefix from the party name was narrowly defeated. This change would come about three years later.

In Northern Ireland, Sinn Féin was organised under the name Republican Clubs to avoid a ban on Sinn Féin candidates (introduced in 1964 under Northern Ireland's Emergency Powers Act). The Officials continued to use this name after 1970, and later used the name Workers' Party Republican Clubs. In 1982, both the northern and southern sections of the party became The Workers' Party.

The Workers' Party is sometimes referred to as the "Sticks" or "Stickies" because in the 1970s it used adhesive stickers for the Easter Lily emblem in its 1916 commemorations, whereas Provisional Sinn Féin used a pin for theirs.

== History ==
=== Origins ===
The modern origins of the party date from the early 1960s. After the failure of the then IRA's 1956–1962 border campaign, the republican movement, with a new military and political leadership, undertook a complete reappraisal of its raison d'être. Through the 1960s, some leading figures in the movement, such as Cathal Goulding, Seán Garland, Billy McMillen, Tomás Mac Giolla, moved steadily to the left, even to Marxism, as a result of their own reading and thinking and contacts with the Irish and international left. This angered more traditional republicans, who wanted to stick to the national question and armed struggle. Also involved in this debate was the Connolly Association. This group's analysis saw the primary obstacle to Irish unity as the continuing division between the Protestant and Catholic working classes. This it attributed to the "divide and rule" policies of capitalism, whose interests were served by the working classes remaining divided. Military activity was seen as counterproductive, because its effect was to further entrench sectarian divisions. The left-wing faction believed the working classes could be united in class struggle to overthrow their common rulers, with a 32-county socialist republic being the inevitable outcome.

However, this Marxist outlook became unpopular with many of the more traditionalist republicans, and the party/army leadership was criticised for failing to defend northern Catholic enclaves from loyalist attacks (these debates took place against the background of the violent beginning of what would be termed the Troubles). A growing minority within the rank-and-file wanted to maintain traditional militarist policies aimed at ending British rule in Northern Ireland. An equally contentious issue involved whether to or not to continue with the policy of abstentionism, that is, the refusal of elected representatives to take their seats in British or Irish legislatures. A majority of the leadership favoured abandoning this policy.

A group consisting of Seán Mac Stiofáin, Dáithí Ó Conaill, Seamus Twomey, and others, established themselves as a "Provisional Army Council" in 1969 in anticipation of a contentious 1970 Sinn Féin Ard Fheis (delegate conference). At the Ard Fheis, the leadership of Sinn Féin failed to attain the required two-thirds majority to change the party's position on abstentionism. The debate was charged with allegations of vote-rigging and expulsions. When the Ard Fheis went on to pass a vote of confidence in the official Army Council (which had already approved an end to the abstentionist policy), Ruairí Ó Brádaigh led the minority in a walk-out, and went to a prearranged meeting in Parnell Square where they announced the establishment of a "caretaker" executive of Sinn Féin. The dissident council became known as the "Provisional Army Council" and its party and military wing as Sinn Féin and the Provisional IRA, while those remaining became known as Official Sinn Féin and the Official IRA. Official Sinn Féin, under the leadership of Tomás Mac Giolla, remained aligned to Goulding's Official IRA.

A key factor in the split was the desire of those who became the Provisionals to make military action the key object of the organisation, rather than a simple rejection of leftism. The pre-split leadership, they stated, had attempted to replace the programme of Wolfe Tone and James Connolly with "the foreign socialism of Marx and Mao". If this had gone unchecked, their argument went, the "traditional" IRA would have been replaced by the “so-called National Liberation Movement”, including Communist Party members.

In 1977, Official Sinn Féin ratified the party's new name—"Sinn Féin The Workers' Party"—without dissension. According to Richard Sinnott, this "symbolism" was completed in April 1982 when the party became simply the Workers' Party.

=== Political development ===
==== OIRA ceasefire ====
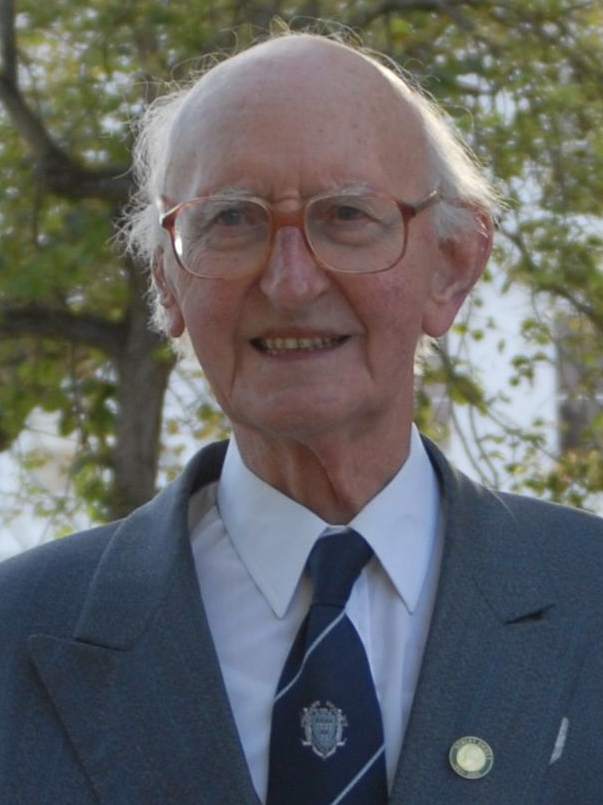
Tomás Mac Giolla served as leader of the Workers' Party for over a quarter of a century

Although the Official IRA became drawn into the spiralling violence of the early period of conflict in Northern Ireland, it almost immediately reduced its military campaign against the United Kingdom's armed presence in Northern Ireland, declaring a permanent ceasefire in May 1972. Following this, the movement's political development increased rapidly throughout the 1970s.

On the national question, the Officials saw the struggle against religious sectarianism and bigotry as their primary task. The party's strategy stemmed from the "stages theory": firstly, working-class unity within Northern Ireland had to be achieved, followed by the establishment of a united Ireland, and finally a socialist society would be created in Ireland.

==== IRSP/INLA split and feud ====
In 1974, the Official Republican Movement split over the ceasefire and the direction of the organisation. This led to the formation of the Irish Republican Socialist Party (IRSP) with Seamus Costello (whom the Official IRA had expelled) as its chairperson. Also formed on the same day was IRSP's paramilitary wing, the Irish National Liberation Army (INLA). A number of tit-for-tat killings occurred in a subsequent feud until a truce was agreed in 1977.

In 1977, the party published a document called the Irish Industrial Revolution. Written by Eoghan Harris and Eamon Smullen, it outlined the party's economic stance and declared that the ongoing violence in Northern Ireland was "distracting working class attention from the class struggle to a mythical national question". The policy document used Marxist terminology: it identified US imperialism as the now-dominant political and economic force in the southern state and attacked the failure of the national bourgeoisie to develop Ireland as a modern economic power.

The pamphlet advocated rapid industrial development through state investment, with state companies taking a leading role in most industries. It envisaged Irish products competing in international markets and proposed creating 330,000 public-sector jobs and 81,000 private-sector jobs by 1986.

Official Sinn Féin gravitated towards Marxism-Leninism and became fiercely critical of the physical force Irish republicanism still espoused by Provisional Sinn Féin. Its new approach to the Northern conflict was typified by the slogan it would adopt: "Peace, Democracy, Class Politics". It aimed to replace sectarian politics with a class struggle which would unite Catholic and Protestant workers. The slogan's echo of Vladimir Lenin's "Peace, Bread, Land" was indicative of the party's new source of inspiration. Official Sinn Féin also built up fraternal relations with the USSR and with socialist, workers' and communist parties around the world.

In the late 1970s, Sinn Féin the Workers' Party campaigned for tax reform to reduce the burden on PAYE workers. Its 1978 pamphlet, Come On the Taxpayers!, called for stronger tax enforcement and greater contributions from farmers, the self-employed and businesses. Party-aligned shop stewards helped press for strike action at Dublin Airport during the 1979 tax protests.

Throughout the 1980s, the party came to staunchly oppose republican political violence, controversially to the point of recommending cooperating with British security forces. They were one of the few organisations on the left of Irish politics to oppose the INLA/Provisional IRA 1981 Irish hunger strike.

The Workers' Party (especially the faction around Harris) strongly criticised traditional Irish republicanism, causing some of its critics such as Vincent Browne and Paddy Prendeville to accuse it of having an attitude to Northern Ireland that was close to Ulster unionism.

Following the February 1982 general election, Sinn Féin the Workers' Party's three TDs supported Charles Haughey's election as taoiseach in March. Its increased parliamentary influence prompted British embassy officials in Dublin to establish direct contacts with Seán Garland and Des O'Hagan.

=== Drugs and community politics ===
During the 1980s, the Workers' Party debated how to respond to Dublin's heroin crisis and the growth of Concerned Parents Against Drugs (CPAD). Its newspaper, The Irish People, published a sympathetic interview with CPAD activists in Fatima Mansions, while its former editor Padraig Yeates co-authored Smack, a study of the city's heroin problem published in 1985. However, party members criticised vigilantism within the anti-drugs campaign and argued that action against drug dealing should involve the Gardaí. Some members subsequently criticised the party's disengagement from the campaign, arguing that it had weakened its standing in working-class communities where Sinn Féin was gaining support through anti-drugs activity.

=== RTÉ branch ===
Media accounts and later commentary have described a secret Workers' Party branch, the Ned Stapleton Cumann, inside Ireland's national broadcaster RTÉ. Centred around the leadership of Eoghan Harris, the members were all employees of RTÉ and many of them were journalists. Members included Charlie Bird, John Caden and Marian Finucane. The branch reportedly began in the early 1970s and continued to operate in secrecy until the early 1990s, around the time of the dissolution of the Soviet Union and the 1992 split that led to the formation of Democratic Left. Remaining undetected was fundamental to the existence of the Cumann, as officially RTÉ reporters were not allowed to have party-political affiliations, in order to appear objective as journalists. The Cumann was influential within RTÉ, and used its position to shape the output of RTÉ programming; they pushed for narratives which reflected the official Sinn Féin/Workers' Party outlook, particularly in relation to the Provisional IRA.

One programme impacted by the Cumann, Today Tonight, aired four nights a week and focused on investigative journalism. Although not directly involved with the show, the Cumann members ensured that SFWP members regularly appeared on the programme without having to acknowledge their membership. The Cumann was also able to influence one of RTÉ's flagship shows The Late Late Show, and placed SFWP activists into the show's studio audience, a studio audience who often took part in discussions on the show.

During 1981 Irish hunger strike, the Cumann was deeply annoyed by the positive coverage that the hunger strikers (such as Bobby Sands) began to receive, as they were aligned with the Provisionals. In response, they produced pieces which focused on the victims of violence by the Provisional IRA in Northern Ireland.

=== 1992 split between Workers' Party and Democratic Left ===
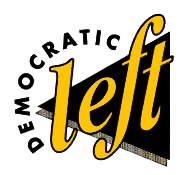
Logo of the Democratic Left

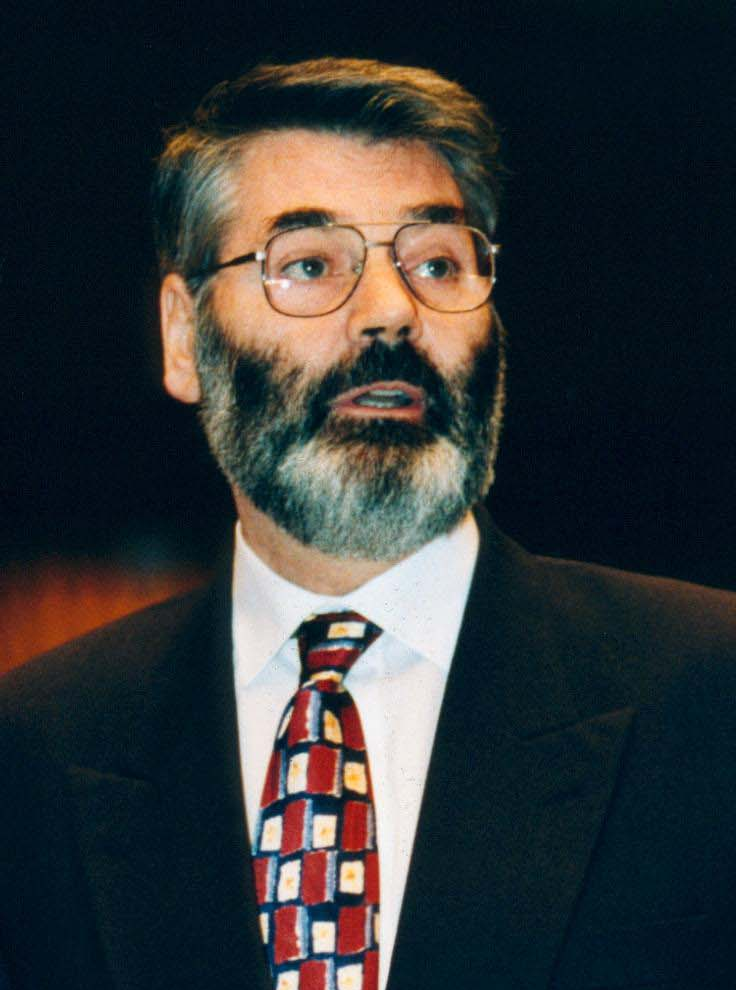
Proinsias De Rossa

Proinsias De Rossa led his faction out of the Workers' Party and into Democratic Left, taking with them the vast majority of the Workers' Party's elected representatives.

In early 1992, following a failed attempt to change the organisation's constitution, six of the party's seven TDs, its MEP, numerous councillors and a significant minority of its membership broke off to form Democratic Left, a party which later merged with the Labour Party in 1999. The continuing Workers' Party maintained its Marxist–Leninist orientation, explicitly reaffirming it at its 2015 Ard Fheis.

Debates within the party reflected wider divisions in European communism. During the late 1970s, some members became interested in Eurocommunism, particularly the ideas of the Italian and Spanish communist parties. Des Geraghty drew on these ideas to question the party's economic policies, while Seán Garland and Des O'Hagan emphasised relations with the Soviet Union and East Germany. The political changes in Eastern Europe in 1989 intensified debate over the party's ideology and organisation. Eoghan Harris advocated adopting social democracy, while Garland and O'Hagan opposed proposals they regarded as abandoning the Leninist conception of a revolutionary party.

The reasons for the split were twofold. Firstly, a faction led by Proinsias De Rossa wanted to move the party towards an acceptance of free-market economics. Following the collapse of communism in eastern Europe, they felt that the Workers' Party's Marxist stance was now an obstacle to winning support at the polls. Secondly, media accusations had once again surfaced regarding the continued existence of the Official IRA which, it was alleged, remained armed and involved in fund-raising robberies, money laundering and other forms of criminality.

De Rossa and his supporters sought to distance themselves from alleged paramilitary activity at a special Árd Fheis held at Dún Laoghaire on 15 February 1992. A motion proposed by De Rossa and General Secretary Des Geraghty sought to stand down the existing membership, elect an 11-member provisional executive council and make several other significant changes in party structures was defeated. The motion to "reconstitute" the party achieved the support of 61% of delegates. However, this was short of the two-thirds majority needed to change the Workers' Party constitution. The Workers' Party later claimed that there was vote rigging by the supporters of the De Rossa motion. As a result of the conference's failure to adopt the motion, De Rossa and his supporters split from the organisation and established a new party which was temporarily known as "New Agenda" before the permanent name of "Democratic Left" was adopted. In the South the rump of the party was left with seven councillors and one TD.

In the North, before the 1992 split, the party had four councillors – Tom French stayed with the party, Gerry Cullen (Dungannon) and Seamus Lynch (Belfast) joined New Agenda/Democratic Left, and David Kettyles ran in subsequent elections in Fermanagh as an independent or Progressive Socialist.

While the majority of public representatives left with De Rossa, many members remained in the Workers' Party. Sean Garland condemned those who broke away as "careerists" and social democrats who had taken flight after the collapse of the Soviet Union and labelled them "liquidators". Declassified British files released in 2018 indicate that the split and its aftermath were closely watched by the British embassy in Dublin, which described substantial bitterness and anger within the party following the breakaway of De Rossa and his supporters.

Marian Donnelly replaced De Rossa as president from 1992 to 1994. Tom French became president in 1994, and served for four years until Sean Garland was elected president in 1998. Garland retired as president in May 2008, and was replaced by Mick Finnegan who served until September 2014, being replaced by Michael Donnelly

A further minor split occurred when a number of members left and established a group called Republican Left; many of these went on to join the Irish Socialist Network. Another split occurred in 1998, after a number of former OIRA members in Newry and Belfast, who had been expelled, formed a group called the Official Republican Movement, which announced in 2010 that it had decommissioned its weapons.

=== 21st century ===
The Workers' Party has struggled since the early 1990s to rejuvenate its fortunes in both Irish jurisdictions. The Workers' Party maintains a youth wing, Workers' Party Youth, and a Women's Committee. It also had offices in Dublin, Belfast, Cork and Waterford. Apart from its political work at home in Ireland, it has sent party delegations to international gatherings of communist and socialist parties. The Workers' Party has been an Irish affiliate of the International Meeting of Communist and Workers' Parties since 1998, having participated annually, with a few exceptions, since the IMCWP's foundation.

The party supported an independent anti-sectarian candidate, John Gilliland, in the 2004 European elections in Northern Ireland.

Waterford City remained a holdout for the party in the 1990s and early 2000s. In the 1997 general election, Martin O'Regan narrowly failed to secure a seat in Waterford. However, in February 2008, John Halligan of Waterford resigned from the party when it refused to drop its opposition to service charges. He later ran as an independent and was elected to the Dáil for Waterford in 2011. The party's sole remaining councillor in Waterford lost his seat in the 2014 local elections.

Michael Donnelly, a Galway-based university lecturer, was elected as the party President at the party's Ard Fheis on 27 September 2014 on the retirement of Mick Finnegan.

==== Campaigns and public activity ====
The Workers' Party called for a No vote against the Treaty of Lisbon in both the June 2008 referendum, in which the proposal was rejected, and the October 2009 referendum, in which the proposal was approved. It was the only left-wing party to campaign for a No vote in the 2013 Seanad abolition referendum. It called for a Yes vote in the marriage equality referendum in 2015. The party supported Brexit in the 2016 referendum.

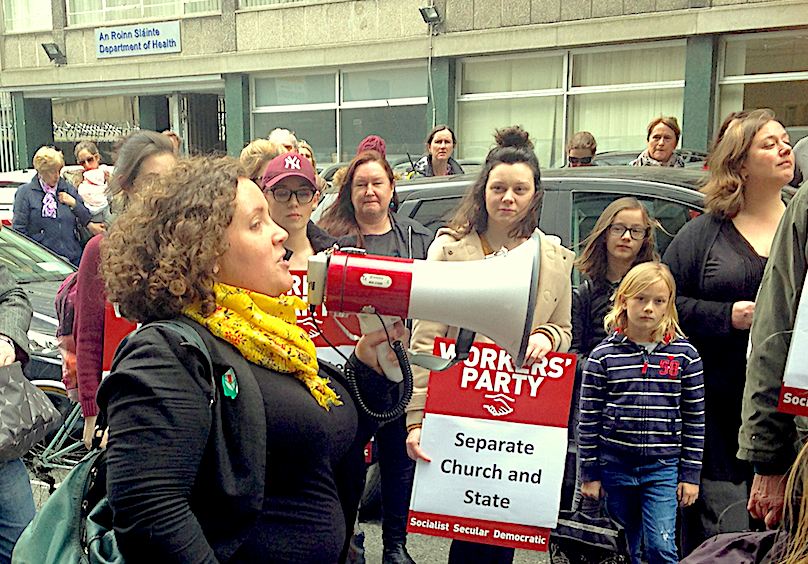
Workers' Party Councillor Éilis Ryan speaking at a protest at the Department of Health against ownership of the National Maternity Hospital by the Sisters of Charity.

The party has been involved in campaigning for public housing and renters' rights as a response to the ongoing housing crisis in Ireland. In 2016, the party published Solidarity Housing, a public housing policy that proposed a cost-rental housing model for Ireland. In July 2016, Dublin City councillors approved a motion put forward by Workers' Party councillor Éilis Ryan that the redevelopment of O'Devaney Gardens should be 100% public, mixed-income housing, although that plan was rescinded in September 2016 after an intervention with Minister for Housing Simon Coveney.

The party retains a tradition of secularism. In April 2017, Councillor Éilis Ryan organised a demonstration against the proposed control of the new National Maternity Hospital by the Religious Sisters of Charity. The Workers' Party campaigned for a yes vote in the referendum to repeal the Eighth amendment in May 2018, having been the only party in the Dáil to oppose the introduction of the Eighth amendment in 1983.

==== Electoral developments ====
At the 2019 local elections, Éilís Ryan lost her seat on Dublin City Council, leaving Ted Tynan as the party's only elected representative in Ireland.

In November 2020, the Standards in Public Office Commission announced that the Workers' Party were one of five political parties who failed to provide them with a set of audited accounts for 2019, in breach of statutory obligations.

==== 2021 split ====
Workers Party
- President: Ted Tynan
- Founded: April 2021
- Split from: Workers' Party
- Youth wing: Workers Party Youth
- Ideology: Communism; Marxism-Leninism
- Political position: Far-left
- European affiliation: ECA (2023–)
- International affiliation: IMCWP

Website
- workersparty.net

The party split in April 2021 following a dispute over the membership of Cork city councillor Ted Tynan, its only elected representative. The Phoenix reported that Tynan had been expelled, which the party denied. Tynan's supporters convened an extraordinary ard fheis, passed motions of no confidence in Michael Donnelly and the existing leadership, and elected Tynan president. The existing leadership rejected the meeting's authority, describing it as the founding conference of a separate organisation. It stated that it retained 14 of the 18 Ard Comhairle members elected at the previous party ard fheis. Michael McCorry subsequently succeeded Donnelly as president.

The Belfast Telegraph reported that the stated reason for attempting to expel Tynan was unpaid membership fees. Tynan attributed the dispute to differences over Irish unity, accusing newer members of seeking to reverse the party's opposition to a border poll. He and his supporters maintained that such a referendum would deepen sectarian divisions.

Both groups continued to use the Workers' Party name. Tynan's group used a clasped-hands logo, while McCorry's retained the Starry Plough and revived the Republican Clubs name in Northern Ireland in 2025. Tynan's group became a founding member of European Communist Action in 2023. Both groups appear on the International Meeting of Communist and Workers' Parties' SolidNet list, which labels the McCorry-led party "official".

Tynan was re-elected to Cork City Council as an independent candidate in the 2024 local elections. He resigned from the council in May 2026 for health reasons.

==== 2025 presidential election ====
The party had previously supported Mary Robinson in the 1990 Irish presidential election, conducting its own campaign alongside other organisations supporting her candidacy. The endorsement generated internal disagreement, with some members questioning Robinson's socialist credentials and the leadership's handling of the decision. Nevertheless, the party organised canvassing and distributed campaign literature, contributing to her support in areas where it had an established electoral presence.

The Workers' Party endorsed independent candidate Catherine Connolly in the 2025 Irish presidential election, describing the endorsement as based on her opposition to NATO and support for Irish neutrality. Connolly was also described during the campaign as part of a broader left-backed candidacy, with support from the Workers' Party among other left-wing parties and groups.

== Political positions ==
=== Economic policy ===
During the 1970s, Official Sinn Féin promoted public ownership of natural resources and an expanded state role in economic development. It helped initiate the Resources Protection Campaign in late 1973, bringing together left-wing groups and trade union supporters to demand the nationalisation of mining and energy rights. Its 1975 policy document, The Public Sector and the Profit Makers, advocated an expanded public sector in energy and mining, a state construction company, and state involvement in food processing and marketing. It proposed nationalising the banks to support these developments.

=== Social policy ===
At its November 1971 ard fheis, Official Sinn Féin called for equal pay for women, the legalisation of contraception and the removal of the ban on divorce. It also proposed ending religious control of education.

The Workers' Party campaigned against the Eighth Amendment in 1983 and was the only party in Dáil Éireann whose entire parliamentary membership voted against the Bill on its final reading. Its two TDs, Tomás Mac Giolla and Proinsias De Rossa, were among the eleven deputies who opposed its passage on 27 April 1983. The party conducted its own referendum campaign, emphasising civil liberties, religious pluralism and opposition to the influence of conservative Catholic organisations. Members distributed leaflets and posters and canvassed door to door.

In 1985, the party's TDs supported legislation liberalising access to contraception, although they considered its provisions too limited. The party also campaigned for the removal of the constitutional ban on divorce, having introduced an unsuccessful divorce bill in 1983. During the 1986 divorce referendum, it campaigned under the slogan "Civil Divorce is a Civil Right" and organised activity in all but two constituencies. The Divorce Action Campaign subsequently acknowledged that Workers' Party activists had provided virtually the entire local Yes campaign in some areas.

=== Trade unions and industrial relations ===
During the late 1970s, Sinn Féin the Workers' Party's Industrial Department developed influence within the Workers' Union of Ireland and promoted national wage agreements. In 1987, the party cautiously welcomed the Programme for National Recovery, the agreement between government, employers, farmers and trade unions that began the social partnership process. It regarded the agreement as a limited advance while expressing reservations about its commitments to tax reform and job creation. Workers' Party trade-union officials helped secure support for the agreement within the Irish Congress of Trade Unions, reflecting the party's preference for national negotiations that could address broader working-class demands.

During the Dunnes Stores anti-apartheid strike, Workers' Party TD Proinsias De Rossa made representations to Taoiseach Garret FitzGerald about the dispute. In a March 1985 reply, FitzGerald acknowledged the strikers' opposition to apartheid but argued that the government could not compel the parties to use the state's industrial-relations machinery.

=== Northern Ireland and Irish unity ===
The failure of the IRA's 1956–1962 Border Campaign influenced the generation that later led the Official republican movement. The campaign cost 18 lives and "singularly failed to achieve its objective"; Seán Garland later said that Northern Ireland was "a much deeper problem than we envisaged". Cathal Goulding concluded that the IRA could not achieve its aims "solely through force of arms", and favoured a politics in which the "demand for revolution should come from the people" rather than from "people sitting in a back room".

The Official republican movement developed a staged strategy that prioritised civil rights, reform in Northern Ireland and the reduction of sectarian division before a renewed drive for Irish unity. In this view, premature military action deepened sectarianism, while political alliances based on "a united working class, North and South" would create the conditions for a united Ireland and, later, socialist revolution. Tomás Mac Giolla rejected the idea that republicans could "bomb one million Protestants into a republic" or "into a socialist republic", arguing in 1972 that Protestant working people were needed "on the workers' side in the Irish revolution".

The same anti-sectarian framing informed the party's later hostility to the H-Block campaign. Garland rejected political status for those involved in "acts of sectarianism", while the party's own H-Block analysis accepted that some prisoners may have been wrongly convicted but argued that many had committed grave offences. By 1989, Proinsias De Rossa continued to frame the Workers' Party position around "the unity of the Irish working class", while arguing that unionists would not be "bullied" into the Republic.

In 1989, the Workers' Party played a central role in organising the Peace Train protest against Provisional IRA attacks on the railway between Dublin and Belfast. Two special trains operated on 28 October, carrying representatives of several political parties. Workers' Party participants included Proinsias De Rossa and Seamus Lynch.

==== Anglo-Irish Agreement ====
The Anglo-Irish Agreement of 1985 divided the Workers' Party leadership. Its northern leadership was overwhelmingly opposed, arguing that the agreement would deepen sectarian divisions and offer little benefit to the working class. Other leaders argued against outright rejection and expressed concern that opposition would align the party with Fianna Fáil and Sinn Féin. Following a narrow majority vote, the leadership decided that the party's TDs should support the agreement in the Dáil.

==== Good Friday Agreement ====
Following the 1992 split that created Democratic Left, the Workers' Party retained most of its northern membership, although its northern branch remained on the sidelines during the peace process. The party supported a "Yes" vote in the 1998 referendum on the Good Friday Agreement. In its 1998 Northern Ireland Assembly manifesto, it welcomed the Agreement's constitutional framework and said that its Assembly candidates would not register as either unionist or nationalist. In 2017, the party called for outstanding elements associated with the Agreement, including a Bill of Rights, integrated education and a civic forum, to be implemented.

=== European integration ===
During the late 1970s, Sinn Féin the Workers' Party debated participation in elections to the European Parliament. In November 1977, its Ard Comhairle decided that the party should contest all five European constituencies on the island of Ireland. At the 1978 ard fheis, the debate over participation centred principally on the cost of contesting the elections rather than direct opposition to the European Economic Community.

The party campaigned against the Single European Act in the 1987 referendum. During the campaign, Proinsias De Rossa criticised the EEC as an organisation intended to preserve and develop capitalism in Western Europe and consolidate it as a power bloc.

=== Foreign policy and neutrality ===
==== Soviet Union ====
The Workers' Party established fraternal relations with the Communist Party of the Soviet Union in 1983. Leading party members visited Moscow and Estonia that year. The Soviet ambassador in Dublin, Alexei Nesterenko, regarded the Workers' Party as an important political force and encouraged other socialist states to develop relations with it, pointing to its greater influence than the Communist Party of Ireland.

The relationship did not ensure Soviet support for all of the party's requests. A 1986 letter seeking £1 million for party publications, staff and political education, whose authorship was later disputed, was considered by the Soviet leadership. A February 1987 memorandum described the Workers' Party as a promising political force but rejected the request because substantial direct funding would be difficult to conceal from Irish, British and American intelligence services.

==== East Germany ====
The development of relations with East Germany's ruling Socialist Unity Party of Germany (SED) was complicated by its longstanding relationship with the Communist Party of Ireland (CPI). In 1981, the SED maintained discreet links between its youth organisation, the Free German Youth, and the Irish Democratic Youth Movement, despite the CPI's opposition to formal relations with Sinn Féin the Workers' Party.

In January 1986, Seán Garland wrote to Erich Honecker proposing formal relations between the two parties. Garland met SED representative Bruno Mahlow in Moscow that March, although further meetings were delayed. An SED delegation attended the Workers' Party's annual conference in Dublin in April 1988, bringing greetings from Honecker. That July, Proinsias De Rossa attended a disarmament conference in East Germany. The SED nevertheless retained the CPI as its principal Irish partner.

==== North Korea ====
Relations with the Workers' Party of Korea developed through visits to North Korea during the 1980s. In September 1983, Seán Garland and the party's director of international affairs, Seán Ó Cionnaith, visited the country and met foreign minister Kim Yong-nam. In September 1984, Tomás Mac Giolla, Seamus Lynch and Garland met Kim Il Sung in Pyongyang. Both parties presented their relationship in terms of opposition to imperialism and the experience of national partition.

The relationship also involved support for Korean reunification and nuclear disarmament. During the 1984 visit, Mac Giolla advocated Irish membership of the Non-Aligned Movement. Garland and Proinsias De Rossa attended an international conference on denuclearisation and peace on the Korean peninsula in Pyongyang in 1986.

The relationship extended to the Official IRA. Journalist John Sweeney, drawing on an interview with an anonymous former member, reported that six members travelled to North Korea through Moscow in October 1988 for military training, including instruction in firearms and explosives.

There was also criticism of North Korea within the party. De Rossa expressed dissatisfaction with its treatment of its citizens following his 1986 visit. In 1990, Colm Breathnach proposed severing relations, describing North Korea as an Orwellian, family-run state, but Garland and other senior party figures rejected the proposal.

==== Palestine ====
The Workers' Party supported the Palestinian national movement. In a January 1986 letter to Erich Honecker proposing relations with East Germany's ruling party, Seán Garland identified support for the Palestine Liberation Organisation and the African National Congress among the party's international commitments.

During the First Intifada, Proinsias De Rossa condemned the treatment of Palestinian civilians by Israeli security forces and asked the Irish government to consider diplomatic or economic sanctions against Israel. Fellow Workers' Party TDs Joe Sherlock and Tomás Mac Giolla compared the situation with apartheid in South Africa, against which Ireland had introduced sanctions. In August 1990, during the crisis following Iraq's invasion of Kuwait, De Rossa warned against allowing the Palestinian question to disappear from the international agenda.

==== Russo-Ukrainian War ====
During the Russo-Ukrainian war, the Workers' Party has supported what it calls "Russia's resistance" to "the imperialist order" and "Western hegemony", arguing that Russian imperialism does not exist. The party believes Russia is actually fighting against NATO, arguing that the Russian invasion of Ukraine was caused by "NATO's drive at expansion and attempt to encircle Russia", and that "the defeat of NATO is the optimal outcome for the working class". It opposes NATO military support for Ukraine, which it calls a "proxy regime", seeing this as a dangerous escalation. The party has taken part in protests against NATO and the Irish government's support for Ukraine, saying that helping Ukraine's military with training goes against Irish neutrality. Irish support for Ukraine has included demining assistance as well as military training.

==== Nuclear power ====
In 1978, Sinn Féin the Workers' Party opposed the proposed nuclear power station at Carnsore Point and supported a protest rally at the site. Its newspaper, the United Irishman, advocated a coal-fired power station at Carnsore, supplied from coal reserves in south-west Ireland. Its 1979 pamphlet, Nuclear Power and Ireland, distinguished opposition to the proposed reactor from opposition to nuclear energy generally, advocating that Ireland await improved technology and obtain it from socialist countries.

In 2023, the Workers' Party launched its policy document Let's Get Real: A Plan for Nuclear Power in Ireland, calling for the immediate introduction of nuclear power in Ireland. RTÉ reported that the party proposed six conventional nuclear plants at two or three sites, at an estimated cost of €50 billion. In its policy paper, the party proposed a 30-year state-led programme using established pressurised water reactor designs, with ESB and EirGrid/SONI involved in ownership or operation and an overseas nuclear partner such as EDF or KEPCO providing construction and training support.

== Organisation ==
=== Structure and decision-making ===
In 1983, an internal party report proposed a more participatory form of democratic centralism, greater emphasis on health and social policy, and a stronger role for specialist policy committees. It sought to curtail the influence of the Industrial Department and Research Section, encouraged the recruitment of women, and proposed that branches should generally be geographically based.

Between annual delegate conferences, or ard fheiseanna, the party is governed by an Ard Comhairle comprising up to 18 members. It meets at least monthly and elects a management committee, which meets at least weekly to oversee the party's day-to-day work and appoint directors responsible for specific areas of activity.

=== Leadership ===
Leader	Portrait	Period
Tomás Mac Giolla		1962–1988
Proinsias De Rossa		1988–1992
Marian Donnelly		1992–1996
Tom French		1996–2000
Seán Garland		2000–2008
Mick Finnegan		2008–2014
Michael Donnelly		2014–2021
Michael McCorry (Note: Following the 2021 split, the Tynan-led breakaway faction described Ted Tynan as its president; see 2021 split.)		2021–present

=== Youth and student activity ===
The Official republican movement developed a student presence in the 1960s through Republican Clubs at Trinity College Dublin and University College Dublin. Trinity’s Republican Club was founded after the 50th anniversary of the Easter Rising and was officially recognised as a college society in 1967. Trinity News described it as the first self-proclaimed society involved in "practical politics" to receive official sanction from the college authorities. The Trinity club later became one of the college’s largest student groups, while members sold the United Irishman, hosted republican speakers and helped promote Republican Clubs at other universities.

Sinn Féin the Workers' Party later became influential in student-union politics. By 1976, party members held senior positions in the Union of Students in Ireland, including the presidency and education roles. The late 1970s marked the height of SFWP influence in student unions, with members holding several full-time elected posts. USI’s affiliation with the International Union of Students brought the union into contact with Soviet-aligned international student networks and became a focus of internal controversy. By 1981, SFWP influence in USI had declined and the union had disaffiliated from the International Union of Students.

The party's youth activity continued through organisations including the Irish Democratic Youth Movement and later Workers' Party Youth, which had branches in Belfast, Downpatrick, Dublin, Cork and Ballina by the mid-1980s. Workers' Party Youth is a member of the World Federation of Democratic Youth.

Workers' Party TCD was re-established as a recognised Trinity society in 2018, after organisers collected the required signatures for Central Societies Committee recognition. The society planned events on imperialism, nuclear power and housing, and was later reported to attract around 75 members annually. In 2019, Workers' Party TCD hosted Cuban ambassador Hugo René Ramos Milanés for a discussion marking the 60th anniversary of the Cuban Revolution. In the mid-2020s, Workers' Party TCD organised debates, discussions, guest-speaker events, coffee hours, pub nights and film screenings and also organised anti-imperialist talks, including discussions of the Cuban Revolution.

In 2023, Workers' Party TCD flew the flag of the Soviet Union at Trinity's freshers' fair, drawing criticism from the Ukrainian and Lithuanian ambassadors to Ireland, who associated the display with Soviet repression and totalitarianism. In 2025, DU Eastern European Society and TCD Ukrainian Society condemned the "continued public display of Soviet symbols" at freshers' fair and asked whether a Nazi flag would be permitted "even if framed between stars or disguised with fireworks". WPTCD responded that its display combined the Starry Plough with the hammer and sickle, that describing the Starry Plough as "stars" or "fireworks" showed "a profound ignorance of Irish history", and that a socialist republican party's display of socialist and republican symbols complied with college rules.

=== Publications ===
The party has published a number of newspapers throughout the years, with many of the theorists of the movement writing for these papers. After the 1970 split the Officials kept publishing the United Irishman (the traditional newspaper of the republican movement) monthly until May 1980. In 1973 the party launched a weekly paper The Irish People, which was focused on issues in the Republic of Ireland, there was also a The Northern People published in Belfast and focused on northern issues. The party published an occasional international bulletin and a woman's magazine called Women's View. From 1989 to 1992 it produced a theoretical magazine called Making Sense. Other papers were produced such as Workers' Weekly.

The party produces a magazine and online publication, LookLeft. It began publication in 2006 and was relaunched in 2010 as a bi-monthly general political-interest magazine, forming part of a Workers' Party media strategy that combined a traditional political journal with online political engagement.

== Election results ==
=== Republic of Ireland ===
The Workers' Party made its electoral breakthrough in 1981 when Joe Sherlock won a seat in Cork East. It increased this to three seats in 1982 and to four seats in 1987. The Workers' Party had its best performance at the polls in 1989 when it won seven seats in the general election and party president Proinsias De Rossa won a seat in Dublin in the European election held on the same day, sitting with the communist Left Unity group.

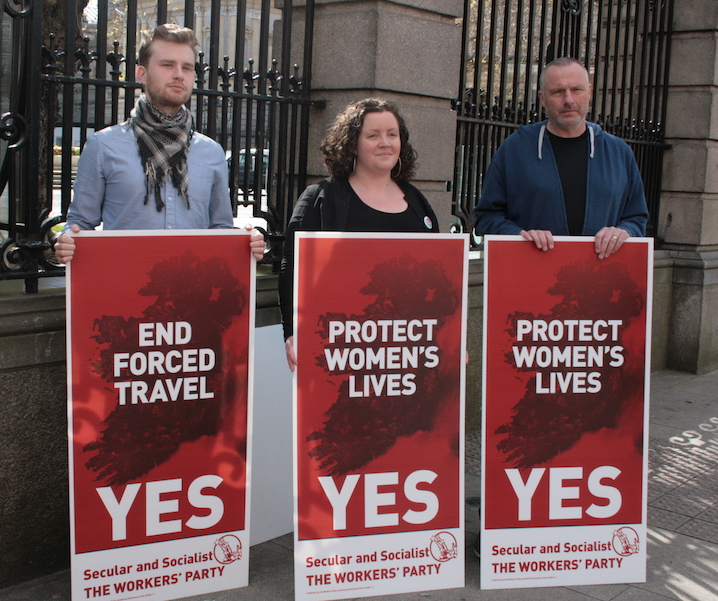
Workers' Party members launching the party's posters for the May 2018 referendum to repeal the 8th amendment.

Following the split of 1992, Tomás Mac Giolla, a TD in Dublin West and president of the party for most of the previous 30 years, was the only member of the Dáil parliamentary party not to side with the new Democratic Left. Mac Giolla lost his seat in the general election later that year, and no TD has been elected for the party since then. However, at local authority level, the Workers' Party maintained elected representation on Dublin, Cork and Waterford corporations in the aftermath of the split, and Mac Giolla was elected Lord Mayor of Dublin in 1993.

Outside of the south-east, the Workers' Party retains active branches in various areas of the Republic, including Dublin, Cork and County Meath. In the 1999 local elections, it lost all of its seats in Dublin and Cork and only managed to retain three seats in Waterford City. Further electoral setbacks and a minor split left the party after the 2004 local elections, with only two councillors, both in Waterford.

The party fielded 12 candidates in the 2009 local elections. The party ran Malachy Steenson in the Dublin Central by-election on the same date. Ted Tynan was elected to Cork City Council in the Cork City North East ward. Davy Walsh retained his seat in Waterford City Council. In the 2014 local elections Tynan retained his seat; however Walsh lost his, following major boundary changes resulting from the merging of Waterford City and County councils. In January 2015, Independent councillor Éilis Ryan on Dublin City Council joined the party.

In the 2011 general election the Workers' Party ran six candidates, without success. In the 2016 general election, the party ran five candidates, again without success.

At the 2019 Irish local elections, the party dropped to one remaining councillor, with Éilís Ryan losing her seat on Dublin City Council.

Following the 2021 split, Ted Tynan was re-elected to Cork City Council for Cork City North East in the 2024 local elections as an independent candidate. The Workers' Party itself ran three candidates in the election, receiving 863 first-preference votes and winning no seats, with Tynan listed in the official results as a non-party candidate. Tynan resigned from the council in May 2026 for health reasons.

==== Dáil Éireann elections ====
Election	Leaders	FPv	%	Seats	%	±	Dáil	Government
1973 (Note: As Official Sinn Féin.)	Tomás Mac Giolla	15,366	1.1 (#4)	0 / 144	—N/a	New	20th	No seats 14th government (FG-Lab majority)
1977 (Note: As Sinn Féin The Workers' Party.)	Tomás Mac Giolla	27,209	1.7 (#4)	0 / 148	—N/a	Steady	21st	No seats 15th, 16th government (FF majority)
1981	Tomás Mac Giolla	29,561	1.7 (#4)	1 / 166	0.6 (#4)	▲1	22nd	Opposition; 17th government (FG-Lab minority)
Feb. 1982	Tomás Mac Giolla	38,088	2.3 (#4)	3 / 166	1.8 (#4)	▲2	23rd	Confidence and supply 18th government (FF minority)
Nov. 1982	Tomás Mac Giolla	54,888	3.3 (#4)	2 / 166	1.2 (#4)	▼1	24th	Opposition; 19th government (FG-Lab majority)
1987	Tomás Mac Giolla	67,273	3.8 (#5)	4 / 166	2.4 (#5)	▲2	25th	Opposition; 20th government (FF minority)
1989	Proinsias De Rossa	82,263	5.0 (#5)	7 / 166	4.2 (#5)	▲3	26th	Opposition; 21st, 22nd government (FF-PD majority)
1992	Tomás Mac Giolla	11,533	0.7 (#8)	0 / 166	—	▼7	27th	No seats 23rd government (FF-Lab majority)
1992	Tomás Mac Giolla	11,533	0.7 (#8)	0 / 166	—	▼7	27th	No seats 24th government (FG-Lab-DL majority)
1997	Tom French	7,808	0.4 (#11)	0 / 166	—N/a	Steady	28th	No seats 25th government (FF-PD minority)
2002	Seán Garland	4,012	0.2 (#9)	0 / 166	—N/a	Steady	29th	No seats 26th government (FF-PD majority)
2007	Seán Garland	3,026	0.1 (#9)	0 / 166	—N/a	Steady	30th	No seats 27th, 28th government (FF-GP-PD/Ind majority)
2011	Mick Finnegan	3,056	0.1 (#10)	0 / 166	—N/a	Steady	31st	No seats 29th government (FG-Lab majority)
2016	Michael Donnelly	3,242	0.2 (#11)	0 / 158	—N/a	Steady	32nd	No seats 30th, 31st government (FG-Ind minority)
2020	Michael Donnelly	1,195	0.1 (#14)	0 / 160	—N/a	Steady	33rd	No seats 32nd, 33rd, 34th government (FF-FG-GP majority)
Did not contest 2024 general election

==== Irish local elections ====
Election	Seats won	±	First pref. votes	%	±
1974 as SF (Officials)	6 / 805	New	16,623	1.3%	New
1979 as SFWP	7 / 769	▲1	31,238	2.3%	▲1.0
1985	20 / 828	▲13	43,006	3.0%	▲0.7
1991	24 / 883	▲3	50,996	3.6%	▲0.6
1999	3 / 1,627	▼21	6,847	0.5%	▼3.1
2004	2 / 1,627	▼1	4,170	0.2%	▼0.3
2009	2 / 1,627	Steady	4,771	0.3%	▲0.1
2014	1 / 949	▼1	3,147	0.18%	▼0.12
2019	1 / 949	Steady	2,620	0.15%	▼0.03
2024	0 / 949	▼1	863	0.05%	▼0.10

=== Northern Ireland ===
The party, standing as Republican Clubs (RC), gained ten seats at the 1973 Northern Ireland local elections. At the 1977 Northern Ireland local elections, this fell to six council seats and 2.6% of the vote. One of their best results was when Tom French polled 19% in the 1986 Upper Bann by-election, although no other candidates stood against the sitting MP and a year later, when other parties contested the constituency, he only polled 4.7% of the vote.

Three councillors left the party during the split in 1992. Davy Kettyles became an independent 'Progressive Socialist' while Gerry Cullen in Dungannon and the Workers' Party northern chairman, Seamus Lynch in Belfast, joined Democratic Left. The party held on to its one council seat in the 1993 local elections with Peter Smyth retaining the seat that had been held by Tom French in Loughside, Craigavon. This was lost in 1997, leaving them without elected representation in Northern Ireland.

The party performed poorly in the 2007 Assembly election; it won no seats, and in its best result in Belfast West, it gained 1.26% of the vote. The party did not field any candidates at the 2010 Westminster general election. In the 2011 Assembly election the Workers' Party ran in four constituencies, securing 586 first-preference votes (1.7%) in Belfast West and 332 (1%) in Belfast North.

The party contested the 2015 Westminster general election, standing parliamentary candidates in Northern Ireland for the first time in ten years. It fielded five candidates and secured 2,724 votes, with Gemma Weir picking up 919 votes (2.3%) in Belfast North. The party did not field candidates in the 2019 Westminster general election. In June 2020 the Ard Comhairle announced the Northern Ireland Business Committee and Belfast Constituency Council had split from the party by adopting "pro-unionist" policies.

The party contested the 2022 Northern Ireland Assembly election, winning 839 (0.10%) first-round votes.

==== Assembly elections ====
Election	Seats won	±	%	First pref. votes
1973	0 / 78	Steady	1.8	13,064
1975	0 / 78	Steady	2.2	14,515
1982	0 / 78	Steady	2.7	17,216
1996	0 / 110	Steady	0.5	3,530
1998	0 / 108	Steady	0.25	1,989
2003	0 / 108	Steady	0.27	1,881
2007	0 / 108	Steady	0.14	975
2011	0 / 108	Steady	0.17	1,155
2016	0 / 108	Steady	0.23	1,565
2017	0 / 90	Steady	0.16	1,261
2022	0 / 90	Steady	0.10	839

==== Northern Ireland local elections ====
Year	Seats	±	First Pref. votes	FPv%	±
1973 as RC	8 / 526	New	20,680	3%	New
1977 as RC	6 / 526	▼2	14,277	2.56%	▼0.44
1981 as WP-RC	3 / 526	▼3	12,059	1.81%	▼0.75
1985	4 / 565	▲1	10,415	1.63%	▼0.18
1989	4 / 582	Steady	13,078	2.12%	▲0.49
1993	1 / 582	▼3	4,827	0.77%	▼1.35
1997	0 / 462	▼1	2,348	0.37%	▼0.4
2001	0 / 462	Steady	1,421	0.18%	▼0.19
2005	0 / 462	Steady	1,052	0.15%	▼0.03
2011	0 / 462	Steady	760	0.12%	▼0.03
2014	0 / 462	Steady	985	0.16%	▲0.04
2019	0 / 462	Steady	868	0.13%	▼0.03
2023	0 / 462	Steady	678	0.09%	▼0.04
