= John Burr =

Scottish painter

- Born: John P. Burr; 1831; Edinburgh, Scotland
- Died: 1893 (aged 61–62); London, England
- Style: Oil and watercolour
- Movement: Genre art

John P. Burr RBA (1831, Edinburgh – 1893, London) was a Scottish oil and watercolour painter of genre scenes, portraits, and landscapes.

At the age of fourteen, Burr began painting portraits of well-to-do people in small Scottish towns. After study at the Trustees' Academy in Edinburgh, Burr painted in Edinburgh until 1861. That year, he and his younger brother Alexander Hohenlohe Burr (1835–1899) established themselves as painters in London. Burr first exhibited at the Royal Academy in 1862 and worked in London until 1892. During his career in London, he exhibited 18 paintings at the Royal Academy, 1 at the British Institution, 3 at the Grosvenor Gallery, 35 at the Society of British Artists, 18 at the Royal Water Colour Society, and numerous paintings in other locations in London. He also exhibited in Edinburgh, Glasgow, Birmingham, Liverpool, and Manchester. His works include The Peepshow and The 5 November.

Burr was elected in 1875 a member of the Society of British Artists and in 1883 a member of the Royal Institute of Oil Painters. He was president of the Society of British Artists from 1881 until May or June 1886 when he resigned.

== Gallery ==
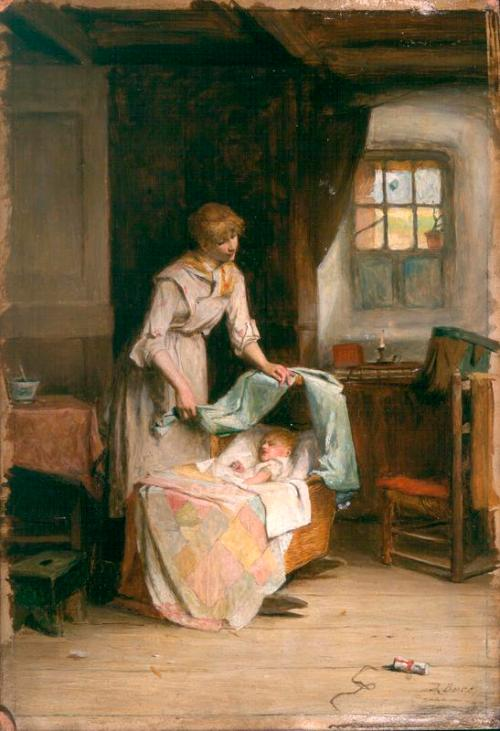
A Happy Home, by John Burr

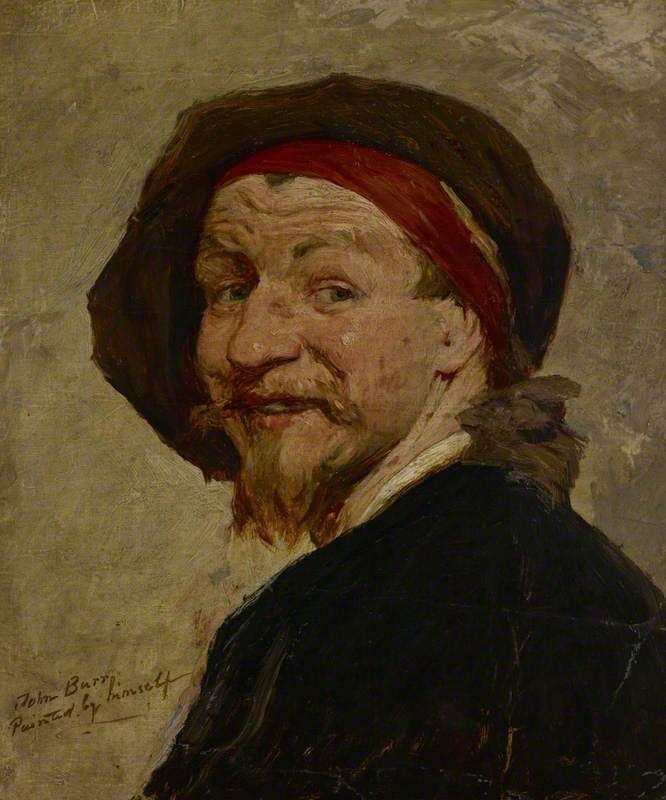
Self-portrait by John Burr – National Galleries of Scotland

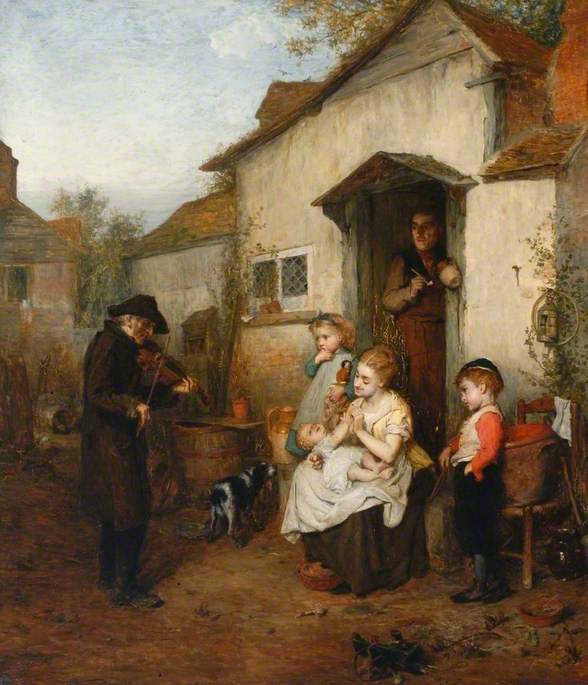
A Wandering Minstrel (1870)

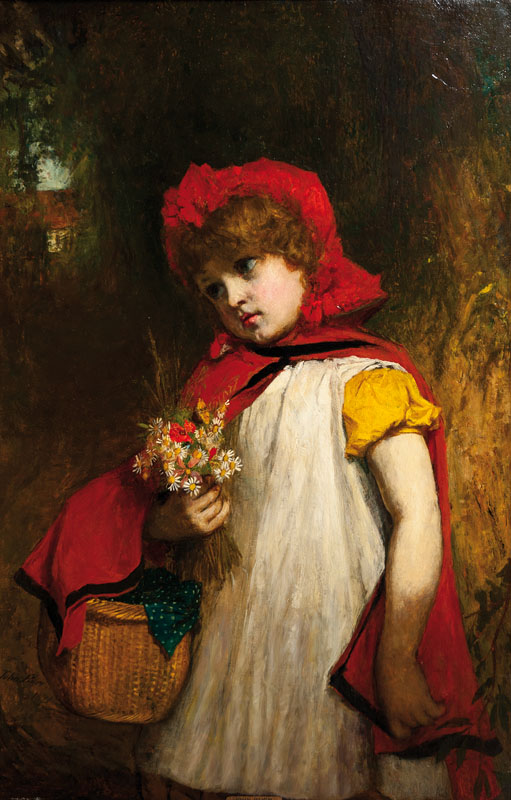
Girl with a Red Cloak (1871)

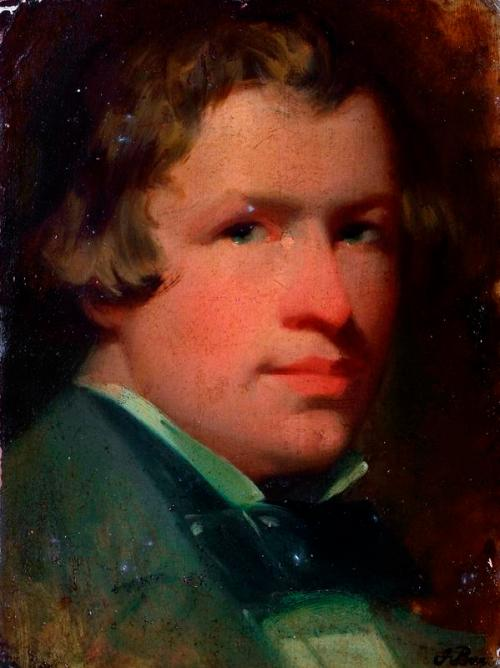
Self-Portrait, by John Burr
