= Imperial College Press =

University press in the United Kingdom

- Type: Publisher
- Industry: Publishing
- Genre: Science
- Founded: 1995 in London
- Founder: Imperial College and World Scientific
- Headquarters: Covent Garden, London, UK
- Products: Academic and scholarly books
- Website: europe.worldscientific.com

Imperial College Press (ICP) was formed in 1995 as a partnership between Imperial College of Science, Technology and Medicine in London and World Scientific publishing.

This publishing house was awarded the rights, by The Nobel Foundation, Sweden, to publish The Nobel Prize: The First 100 years, edited by Agneta Wallin Levinovitz and Nils Ringertz.

They publish areas of teaching and research at Imperial College: Chemistry, Computer Science, Economics, Finance & Management, Engineering, Environmental Science, Life Sciences, Mathematics, Medicine & Healthcare, and Physics.

As of August 2016, ICP has been fully incorporated into World Scientific under the new imprint, World Scientific Europe.

== Selected journals ==
- Journal of Bioinformatics and Computational Biology
- Journal of Integrative Neuroscience
- International Journal of Innovation Management
- Journal of Environmental Assessment Policy and Management
