= Socialist republic (disambiguation) =

Socialist republic commonly refers to a self-designated socialist state

Socialist republic may also refer to:

- Many communist states designate themselves as "socialist republic"
- Socialist state (communism), a communist state that self-designates as a socialist republic.
- Soviet republic, an administrative unit of the Soviet Union.
- People's republic, a state that designates as a people's republic is often an adherent of a socialist ideology
- People's democratic state, a communist state that self-designates as a people's democratic republic
