= People's democracy (Marxism–Leninism) =

Marxist–Leninist concept

People's democracy is a Marxist–Leninist theoretical concept that chiefly encompasses two processes: the people's democratic revolution and the people's democratic state. The first process focuses on the establishment of a communist state formation known as the people's democratic state through a people's democratic revolution. The second process deals with how the people's democratic state transitions the society it controls from the capitalist mode of production to the socialist mode of production, transforming the state into a socialist state in the process.

People's democratic theory has also spawned concepts unique to certain communist states. For example, the Chinese Communist Party has developed theories that have the same or similar origins to people's democracy, known as New Democracy, the people's democratic dictatorship and whole-process people's democracy.

== Theoretical origins ==
The theory of people's democracy was conceived largely by Soviet theorists with small, but insignificant contributions from other communist states. It was conceived to explain the emergence and development of the new communist states established after World War II. In this regard, it shares similarities with another term, people's republic, which was used to designate states in Asia, such as the Bukharan People's Soviet Republic, Khorezm People's Soviet Republic (KPSR), Mongolian People's Republic and the Tuvan People's Republic. These states received this designation since they were considered far too underdeveloped to initiate the construction of socialism. Pravda, the official newspaper of the Central Committee of the Communist Party of the Soviet Union, referred to Mongolia upon its establishment as a "bourgeois-democratic system of a new type." Neither Bukhara nor Khorezm claimed to have reached socialism, with the KPSR constitution explicitly stating that the state had not reached socialism. The Far Eastern Republic, while not using the title of people's republic in its name, was recognised by the Russian Soviet Federative Socialist Republic as a "separate, independent, democratic republic".

Despite the widespread use of the term people's republic, no theoretical system was created to explain its usage. Considering that all these republics, except Mongolia, joined the Soviet Union, the term itself disappeared somewhat from Soviet usage. With the end of World War II and the emergence of European communist states, the term people's republic experienced a comeback of sorts, as part of the theoretical system of people's democracy (and New Democracy). However, despite its widespread use in the communist world after World War II, Western commentators and non-communists have rarely acknowledged the term. The people's democracy and people's democratic state replaced previous terminology. For example, in 1934, the Communist Party of India called for establishing a soviet republic, but in 1948 it declared its commitment to establishing a people's democratic state. The same could be witnessed in Europe where, for example, the French Communist Party called for the establishment of a soviet republic in France in 1940, but began already in 1941 to call for the establishment of a "people's regime", a theoretical precursor to the people's democratic state.

Due to this theory's unclear origin, Marxist−Leninist theorists did not agree among themselves which country had established the world's first people's democratic state. For example, orientalist Ilya Zlatkin claimed in 1951 at a conference on people's democracy hosted by the Oriental Institute of the USSR Academy of Sciences, that Bukhara was the first people's democratic state. However, the official position of the Mongolian People's Republic was that it was the first. Aleksey Martinov and Pyotr Zayonchkovsky disagreed with this claim, arguing that the first people's democracies were established after World War II. Historian Georgy Ehrenburg disagreed with all of them, arguing that people's democracy had first come into being in China during the Chinese Civil War. Some pointed to Mao Zedong's 1940 pamphlet, On New Democracy, as the origins story of people's democracy while others pointed to Yugoslav leader Josip Broz Tito's speech to the 3rd Session of the Anti-Fascist Council for the National Liberation of Yugoslavia in 1945 in which he called for a "new type of democracy based upon the social equality of the masses."

=== From vagueness to unique national paths to socialism ===
In the first postwar years, Soviet leaders did not try to explain the meaning of the term people's democracy. Its vagueness was its strength, and in postwar Czechoslovakia, for example, it was used by non-communists, such as Edvard Beneš, and communists alike, such as Klement Gottwald. Beneš even affirmed that Czechoslovakia was a people's democratic state. At that point in time, neither Joseph Stalin, the Soviet leader, nor any other high-ranking Soviet official tried to give the term any coherent meaning. Scholar Francis J. Kase reasons that many in postwar Eastern Europe believed the term to mean a hybrid of the Soviet and liberal democratic form of state.

The first attempts at creating a theoretical system began in 1947. The main characteristic was that the people's democratic states followed a different path to socialism than the Soviet Union. Another important feature was that the people's democratic state was deemed a transitory state between the capitalist mode of production and the socialist mode of production. In March 1947, Eugen Varga, in his article "Democracy of a New Type", argued that the new democracies of Eastern Europe represented a new order. The feudal mode of production had been abolished while industry and banking had come under state ownership, but private ownership in other sectors had yet to be abolished. The class character of the state was proletarian since the proletariat acted as a ruling class in an alliance with other progressive classes.

Varga noted it would be wrong to categorise the class character of these states as the dictatorship of the proletariat since the states in question not only allowed other classes to operate their own parties, but these parties were allowed to participate in state affairs. He viewed the people's democratic states as a "third type of state" that was neither the dictatorship of the proletariat nor the dictatorship of the bourgeoisie, implying that the state was neither socialist nor capitalist as well. Seeing that it was a transitory state formation, its main aim was to transition the state and society from capitalism to socialism by nationalising and developing the economy. He thus argued that the people's democratic states represented "something entirely new in the history of mankind." However, despite this label, Varga was open to the possibility of the Eastern European states not instituting a carbon copy of the communist form of government, arguing that a parliamentary democracy under the communist party's leadership was also a viable system.

Unlike Varga, Soviet theorist Ilya Trainin was more careful. Like Varga, he acknowledged that the people's democratic states represented a new type of state that he called "democracies of special type". Trainin was more careful regarding the class character of the state, arguing that the working class should rule in an alliance with other forces by forming a broad coalition based on national and democratic programmes rather than on socialism. In this broad coalition, Trainin envisioned the communist party to have a hegemonic role, which was a prerequisite if socialism was to be constructed in this coalition. This was necessary to ensure the communist party enjoyed support amongst the broad masses.

Due to the vagueness of the people's democratic discourse, the newly installed communist state leaders used the term to denote a national path to socialism different from that traversed by the Soviet Union. Georgy Dimitrov, the first leader of communist Bulgaria, began speaking of a "Bulgarian course toward socialism" and of a "realistic and painless road to socialism" in 1946, which all implied a less violent transition than what the Soviet Union experienced. Władysław Gomułka, the first secretary of the Central Committee of the Polish Workers' Party, argued in 1948 that Poland needed to implement its own unique policy of a Polish path to socialism. Gomułka believed that Poland had selected a distinctive Polish route for its development, which he called the path of people's democracy. Given the current circumstances, neither a dictatorship of the working class nor a one-party dictatorship is required or desired, Gomułka argued. He thought that the governance of Poland could be achieved through collaboration among all democratic parties. This viewpoint emerged from Poland's socio-political context, as he contended that the democracy the communists were establishing was unparalleled in history. Additionally, unlike the Soviet Union, Poland did not adopt the socialist mode of production or establish a socialist state since non-state forms of property continued to play a significant role in the economy. Gomułka believed that the Polish democracy the communists were creating was distinct from traditional democracies in other nations, except for those governed by a parliament with a socialist majority.

Klement Gottwald, the chairman of the Central Committee of the Communist Party of Czechoslovakia, seemed to share Dimitrov and Gomułka's sentiment. Gottwald felt that the Czechoslovak people were experiencing a unique transformation that didn't align with any previous experience. During this period, it was essential for the Czechoslovak communists to discover a unique national path, tactics, and distinct methods to construct socialism. Consequently, he believed Czechoslovakia was undergoing a national and democratic revolution that was establishing a unique Czechoslovak state type. Gottwald reasoned that this new state type, peculiar to Czechoslovakia, was a people's democratic republic. It was based on an alliance of people from rural and urban areas in the National Front that had successfully removed the former capitalist ruling class from power.

There was not one road to socialism, but many, reasoned Gottwald. This, he argued, was made clear in the classical Marxist–Leninist works. That meant, he reasoned, that Czechoslovakia did not need to introduce the dictatorship of the proletariat and the system of soviets. Since the material forces in Czechoslovakia differed from those in the Soviet Union when it transitioned to the socialist mode of production, another path was possible. This meant, he reasoned, that Czechoslovakia was creating its own unique "new type of democracy" that he labelled people's democracy. However, this was not unique to Czechoslovakia, and the countries of Bulgaria, Poland, and Yugoslavia were also traversing their own unique road to socialism. By 1948, this line was changed, and the orthodox Soviet position on people's democracy was formulated and broadly accepted by the communist world.

== People's democratic revolution ==
Aleksander Sobolev formulated the first coherent theoretical framework on the people's democratic revolution in 1951. His 1951 article, "People's Democracy as a Form of Political Organisation of Society", was published in the CPSU Central Committee's theoretical journal Bolshevik. Sobolev's framework was constructed on the already accepted Marxist–Leninist conception of a two-stage theory, that is, the people's democratic revolution had to undergo two phases: first, the bourgeois-democratic revolution and, second, the socialist revolution. '

Marx's and Engels' conception of a two-stage revolution was later expounded on by Vladimir Lenin, the leader of what became known as the Communist Party of the Soviet Union. In his, The Tasks of the Russian Social-Democrats (1898) and Two Tactics of Social Democracy in the Democratic Revolution (1905), Lenin directly borrowed this framework and tried to make it relevant to the conditions in the Russian Empire. According to Lenin's perspective, the party was for guiding the proletariat's class struggle and coordinating it in two key forms: the democratic struggle and the socialist struggle. The democratic struggle focused on opposing absolutism to achieve political freedom in Russia and to promote the democratisation of the state system, while the socialist struggle aimed to dismantle capitalism to establish socialism.

Marxist–Leninists distinguished between a bourgeois revolution and a bourgeois democratic revolution. While both revolutions were perceived as bringing the bourgeoisie to power by abolishing the feudal mode of production and the monarchic absolutism, the two revolutions had different class traits. That means, at first glance, that these revolutions appear identical. For example, Czechoslovak theorists Jiří Houška and Karel Kára, defined the bourgeois democratic revolution as a "social revolution whose historical task is to renew the harmony between the relations of production and the forces of production on the basis of capitalism." However, what distinguishes it from the bourgeois revolution is that the bourgeois democratic revolution purportedly benefits the broad masses of people.

According to Sobolev, the first stage of the people's democratic revolution, that is, the bourgeouis democratic revolution, was an anti-imperialist and anti-fascist revolution directed against German Nazism and the oppression of the people it had overseen. Like a traditional bourgeois democratic revolution, the people's democratic revolution was an anti-feudal revolution directed at the remaining feudal elements in Eastern European society. In its first phase, the bourgeois democratic revolutionary stage, the people's democratic revolution was expected to focus on abolishing feudalism rather than constructing socialism. Its anti-fascist characteristics were also perceived as being mostly anti-feudal, since fascism represented the most reactionary form of capitalism in the age of imperialism. That is, it had sought to defend basic feudal elements in the economy instead of liquidating them.

The bourgeois democratic revolution does not end, but grows into its proletarian socialist revolution, its second and final stage. This theory, while formulated by Lenin, had many similarities with Leon Trotsky's permanent revolution and Mao Zedong's later call for uninterrupted revolution. This theory of an uninterrupted revolution that grows into a higher revolutionary process has certain preconditions, Soviet theorists believed, to be successful. For example, the Mongolian revolution of 1921 could transition into a socialist revolution thanks to the existence and help offered by the Soviet Union, which assisted Mongolia in establishing a modern material base as well as the superstructural forces that were struggling for socialism.

According to Sobolev, the proletariat can liquidate capitalism by gradually weakening the bourgeoisie's material base. The key tool in this context is the nationalisation of major industries, banks, transportation systems, and foreign trade that were once the private property of the bourgeoisie. In doing so, the proletariat destroys the material base of the bourgeoisie and other social material forces hostile to the people's democratic revolution. Another benefit, according to Sobolev, is that these made the people in democratic states economically independent of the advanced capitalist states.

The success of the socialist revolution in the people's democratic states of Eastern Europe can be attributed to five key factors, according to Sobolev. Firstly, the revolution occurred at a moment when the correlation of forces was favourable, both domestically and internationally. Secondly, it was not simply a coup d'état, but rather the culmination of the revolution itself. Thirdly, it comprised multiple distinct incidents that collectively formed the revolution. Fourthly, it arose from a combination of grassroots pressure from the populace and pressure from above by state institutions under proletarian control. Lastly, it was achieved without resorting to armed insurrection.

== People's democratic state ==
Soviet theorists outlined two broad, but similar, basic definitions of what people's democracy was. In 1955, Mark Rozental offered this definition: "People's democracy is a new form of the political organisation of society which was established in a number of countries of Europe and Asia as a result of both the destruction of Germany and Japan by an anti-fascist coalition standing under the leadership of the Soviet Union, and the victory of the national liberation movements." A year earlier, the Great Soviet Encyclopedia, gave another, but similar sounding one: "People's democracy is a form of political organisation of society the essence of which, in accordance with concrete historical conditions, is either a dictatorship of the proletariat or a joint dictatorship of the proletariat and peasantry." Rozental stresses the historical forces that brought these states into being, while the definition of the Great Soviet Encyclopedia gives more attention to the state's class character.

The first orthodox theory of people's democracy was formulated by Soviet scholar E. S. Lazutkin, who concluded that the people's democratic state was similar to the socialist state of the Soviet Union, both being a form of the dictatorship of the proletariat. During the 5th Congress of the Bulgarian Communist Party, held on 18−25 December 1948, Grigor Dimitrov stated that after personal discussions with Stalin and other members of the Soviet Communist Party, he recognized that, according to Marxism–Leninism, the Soviet state and the people's democratic state represented two distinct organisational forms of state power, that is, forms of government, but they shared the same class character. In the people's democratic state, the proletariat acted as the ruling class and headed a broad alliance of the working masses from rural and urban areas. That meant this system was not identical to the Soviet dictatorship of the proletariat, but was a form of proletarian rule. Dimitrov also stressed that the class character of the state was primary to its organisational form, stating that states without a communist form of government could be reasonable be designated as people's democratic states because its content, the class character, "forms its flesh and blood. The content of the people's democracy is the dictatorship of the proletariat."

Like the dictatorship of the proletariat of the socialist state, the new proletarian form of class rule of the people's democratic state was tasked with transitioning society from capitalism to socialism. Dimitrov told the congress that the universal principles of history, when viewed through a historical materialist lens, do not significantly vary from country to country; they remain consistent. Thus, the only way to transition to socialism was by establishing a dictatorship of the proletariat and directing it against capitalism, similarly to what the Soviet Union had done. After Dimitrov's congress speech, it was followed by his counterparts in the other Eastern European communist states. Several theoretical works also followed up his speech on people's democracy, the most notable one being Naum Farberov's 1949 The State of People's Democracy, which was approved by the Soviet Ministry of Higher Education as a textbook for Soviet universities.

Soviet theorist Boris Mankovsky reached the same conclusion as Farberov, stating that people's democracy was "states of the transition from capitalism to socialism, states in which socialism is being built." Like Farberov, Mankovsky defined the people's democratic state as a state of a socialist type since, like its Soviet counterpart, it was a transitory state that was under the rule of the working class. He also defined the people's democratic revolution as a socialist revolution that sought to carry out the same historical tasks. The key difference was that the people's democratic state also had to carry out several bourgeois-democratic responsibilities, such as the destruction of feudalism and the enactment of agrarian reform. However, the fact that the people's democratic state had to carry out capitalist policies did not make it less socialist: it was socialist since the working class led the state. He deemed it as anti-Marxist to call the people's democratic revolution a bourgeois democratic revolution.

Marxist economist Pyotr Figurnov argued that the main difference in the organisational form of state power between the Soviet socialist state and the people's democracies was the existence of other political parties. These parties formed a coalition that respected the communist party's role as the vanguard party of the working class and the toiling masses, and its monopoly on state power. This was perceived to be a multi-class coalition representing the vast majority of people in the people's democratic state. Despite these differences, Figurnov still believed the organisational form of state power was a different form of the same type of state.
