= People's democratic revolution =

Classification in Marxist–Leninist theory

A people's democratic revolution is a specific type of revolution according to the Marxist–Leninist theory of people's democracy. This purported revolution seeks to establish a communist state formation known as the people's democratic state.

== Overview ==
Aleksander Sobolev formulated the first coherent theoretical framework on the people's democratic revolution in 1951. His 1951 article, "People's Democracy as a Form of Political Organisation of Society", was published in the CPSU Central Committee's theoretical journal Bolshevik. Upon being published, it was immediately translated into the foreign languages of the communist parties of the people's democratic states, and published in their respective theoretical journals. Sobolev was, at this point, not a party cadre or a party ideologue, but instead an academic at the USSR Academy of Sciences, the highest state research institution. Despite his minimal presence in the party, the CPSU Central Committee supported his position. On 19 April 1952, in an article in Pravda, the newspaper of the CPSU Central Committee, it listed significant errors in the works of ideologues, theorists, and scholars on the subject of people's democracy.

Sobolev's framework was constructed on the already accepted Marxist–Leninist conception of a two-stage theory, that is, the people's democratic revolution had to undergo two phases: first, the bourgeois-democratic revolution and, second, the socialist revolution. The theory of the two-stage revolution was taken from The Communist Manifesto, written by Karl Marx and Friedrich Engels. In it, they posit that a bourgeois revolution has to take place first to abolish the feudal mode of production and superstructure, and introduce the capitalist mode of production and the dictatorship of the bourgeois. To reach communism, a proletarian revolution was needed to abolish capitalism and establish the dictatorship of the proletariat.

Marx's and Engels' conception of a two-stage revolution was later expounded on by Vladimir Lenin, the leader of what became known as the Communist Party of the Soviet Union. In his, The Tasks of the Russian Social-Democrats (1898) and Two Tactics of Social Democracy in the Democratic Revolution (1905), Lenin directly borrowed this framework and tried to make it relevant to the conditions in the Russian Empire. According to Lenin's perspective, the party was for guiding the proletariat's class struggle and coordinating it in two key forms: the democratic struggle and the socialist struggle. The democratic struggle focused on opposing absolutism to achieve political freedom in Russia and to promote the democratisation of the state system, while the socialist struggle aimed to dismantle capitalism to establish socialism.

Although Lenin emphasized that the two revolutions were separate, he also thought they were inextricably connected. The proletariat was alone in its fight for socialism but had many potential allies in its struggle against tsarist absolutism and oppression. In the fight against tsarism, the proletariat would, he believed, naturally find an ally in the bourgeoisie and other social forces that opposed absolutism. He advised that the party align with all progressive forces and set socialism aside until it became relevant. Unlike Marx and Engels, he believed that it would be better for the proletariat to lead the bourgeois-democratic revolution. Lenin argued that the bourgeoisie was not capable of consistently upholding democratic principles and would ultimately betray the quest for liberty.

Lenin recognised that, from a Marxist perspective, the material conditions of the Russian Empire were insufficient to establish a dictatorship of the proletariat following a bourgeois democratic revolution. His solution was to form a class alliance led by the proletariat, which he termed the revolutionary-democratic dictatorship of the proletariat and peasantry in the immediate aftermath of the bourgeois democratic revolution. This revolutionary-democratic dictatorship would be distinctly Jacobin in nature, focusing on eliminating enemies of freedom, suppressing any resistance through force, and making no compromises with the despised legacy of serfdom, Asiatic oppression, and human degradation. Lenin emphasised that this revolutionary-democratic dictatorship would not liquidate capitalism but would strengthen it within the context of the bourgeois democratic revolution. He predicted that as soon as the bourgeois democratic revolution was completed, a proletarian socialist revolution would immediately follow. In this second revolutionary stage, the proletariat would join forces with semi-proletarians to abolish capitalism and establish socialism.

== Bourgeois democratic revolution ==
Marxist–Leninists distinguished between a bourgeois revolution and a bourgeois democratic revolution. While both revolutions were perceived as bringing the bourgeoisie to power by abolishing the feudal mode of production and the monarchic absolutism, the two revolutions had different class traits. That means, at first glance, that these revolutions appear identical. For example, Czechoslovak theorists Jiří Houška and Karel Kára, defined the bourgeois democratic revolution as a "social revolution whose historical task is to renew the harmony between the relations of production and the forces of production on the basis of capitalism." However, what distinguishes it from the bourgeois revolution is that the bourgeois democratic revolution purportedly benefits the broad masses of people.

While the broad masses of the people have always participated in bourgeois revolutions, from a historical perspective, they are always, according to Houška and Kára, betrayed by the bourgeoisie. Marxist–Leninist teaching usually turns to the French Revolution of 1789 as a good example. While the revolution called for abolishing privileges and the institution of real equality, it ended up instituting capitalism while the broad masses were purportedly deprived of all political and social rights. The American Revolution was treated similarly. It was interpreted as a revolution that became a reality due to the broad coalition of small farmers and workers who supported it. Still, upon the revolution's completion, it laid the basis for the growth of capitalism instead of representing the broad masses.

Unlike these revolutions, the bourgeois democratic revolution of the people's democratic revolution was not to be led by the bourgeoisie themselves. In his, Imperialism, the Highest Stage of Capitalism, Lenin had argued that capitalism had become an international system of exploitation. In this stage, capitalist-imperialists defended feudalism in backward parts of the world to protect their own interests. From then on, Marxist–Leninists believed that the Western capitalist bourgeois stopped playing a progressive role in abolishing feudalism. To ensure that feudalism and the remnants of feudalism were abolished, the proletariat needed to take over the leadership of the bourgeois democratic revolution. According to this thinking, the proletarian socialist revolution commences immediately after the completion of the bourgeois democratic revolution, meaning that the bourgeois never takes control of the state.

Sobolev theorised that the first stage of the people's democratic revolution, that is, the bourgeois democratic revolution, was an anti-imperialist and anti-fascist revolution directed against German Nazism and the oppression of the people it had overseen. Like a traditional bourgeois democratic revolution, the people's democratic revolution was an anti-feudal revolution directed at the remaining feudal elements in Eastern European society. In its first phase, the bourgeois democratic revolutionary stage, the people's democratic revolution was expected to focus on abolishing feudalism rather than constructing socialism. Its anti-fascist characteristics were also perceived as being mostly anti-feudal, since fascism represented the most reactionary form of capitalism in the age of imperialism. That is, it had sought to defend basic feudal elements in the economy instead of liquidating them.

According to Marxist–Leninist doctrine, the people's democratic revolution has six distinctive characteristics during its bourgeois-democratic phase. The initial two characteristics focus on the class character of the revolution. To start, the revolution is under the leadership of the proletariat, which supplies its own methods of revolutionary action and imparts a unique character to the revolution. Secondly, the peasantry, instead of supporting the bourgeoisie during the revolution, chooses to join forces with the proletariat.

The third, fourth, and fifth characteristics deal with the nature of the bourgeois revolution led by the proletariat. The third characteristic views the bourgeois revolution as an integral element of the world revolution. This facet connected two phenomena traditional Marxism originally viewed as incompatible: nationalism and socialist internationalism. Fourthly, the bourgeois-democratic revolutions led by the proletariat are supported by the Soviet Union, increasing their chances of success.

The fifth characteristic states that, at this point, the bourgeoisie cannot initiate any democratic revolution. It is thus the proletariat's responsibility to decide who controls the state and directs the revolution. Nonetheless, the proletarian leadership in the bourgeois-democratic revolution did not imply that the proletariat monopolised state power alone. The proletariat's primary responsibility at this point is to liberate the peasantry from the sway of the bourgeois. With this foundation, the proletariat can overthrow the existing ruling class system and establish a state based on the dictatorship of the proletariat, creating a superstructural relation conducive to socialism.

The final characteristic pertains to the material base. Since capitalism is in crisis, the material base of the bourgeois-democratic revolution is the agrarian revolution. This revolution aims to redistribute land based on the idea that land should go to the people who cultivate it. The foundations of socialism have been established through the state nationalising the commanding heights of the industry and banking sectors. Still, capitalism remains society's dominant mode of production at this point. According to Mao Zedong, the bourgeois democratic revolution paves the way for capitalism by establishing the material base for socialism.

== Transitioning into the proletarian socialist revolution ==
The bourgeois democratic revolution does not end, but grows into its proletarian socialist revolution, its second and final stage. This theory, while formulated by Lenin, had many similarities with Leon Trotsky's permanent revolution and Mao Zedong's later call for uninterrupted revolution. This theory of an uninterrupted revolution that grows into a higher revolutionary process has certain preconditions, Soviet theorists believed, to be successful. For example, the Mongolian revolution of 1921 could transition into a socialist revolution thanks to the existence and help offered by the Soviet Union, which assisted Mongolia in establishing a modern material base as well as the superstructural forces that were struggling for socialism.

Dmitry Chesnokov, a philosopher who later became a member of the Presidium of the CPSU Central Committee, believed that a bourgeois democratic revolution could only transition into a socialist one if the following preconditions were met: firstly, that the revolution was led by the proletariat and secondly, constellation of forces in society were conducive to estalibh proletarian rule.

The proletariat, in the class coalition phase of the bourgeois democratic revolution, had to, according to Soviet theorists, use its control of the state machinery to garner support for its cause and pressure competing classes actively out of state positions. Soviet ideologues referred to this as "revolution from above". Nikolai Tropkin, a Soviet theorist, asserted that the primary means of moving from a bourgeois revolution to a proletarian socialist revolution in Eastern Europe was not accomplished by violently overthrowing the state. Instead, revolutionary change was instigated by a peaceful revolution initiated from above, led by state organs under proletarian control with the backing of the popular masses from below.

During the bourgeois democratic revolution, the communist party both publicly works with non-communist forces and simultaneously attempts to undermine them. In the early years of the people's democracies in Eastern Europe, the communist parties achieved this by forming broad national fronts led by themselves. Initially, the Communist Party of Czechoslovakia fostered collaboration with other political parties through the National Front. However, as time progressed, the party leveraged its control over it to marginalize these same parties. It chose this approach rather than making any overt attempt at seizing state power for itself. Consequently, there was a slow marginalisation of non-communist groups.

Klement Gottwald referred to this strategy as a dual tactic. He conveyed to party members that advocating for the tactics of the National Front and collaborating with other non-communist groups did not imply that the class struggle had stopped. It continued in a different form that was, according to Gottwald, more beneficial to the communist party.

Czechoslovak theorist Ivan Bystřina, in his book People’s Democracy, contends that during the early phase of the national and democratic revolution—what the Communist Party of Czechoslovakia officially referred to as their bourgeois democratic revolution—a temporary alliance with a specific part of the bourgeoisie was a strategic component of the party's National Front's tactics. He thought that this partnership represented a novel type of class struggle, one that benefited the proletariat.

Bystřina believed this form of class struggle had two overriding characteristics. The communist party sought to work with what they considered to be the democratic elements of the bourgeois. They supported these elements and aimed to identify and weaken the reactionary groups within the bourgeois. This was part of the communist strategy to liquidate these same groups at a later date. Secondly, the communist party sought to be the instigator of policies related to the revolution and the establishment of the people's democratic state. The leadership of the state was the main tool, according to Bystřina, used to reveal and marginalise the bourgeoisie.

The aim of dual tactics was to remove the bourgeois from the state by any means required and to convince the masses to support communism through peaceful and democratic means. In order to begin the transition toward the proletarian socialist revolution, the working class had to gain full control over all state positions of worth. This would finalise the isolation of the bourgeois from political authority, creating a favourable environment for the communists to gain support from the populace. This victory should be achieved, according to Jiří Houška and Karel Kára, through a democratic election in which the communists attain power. The election victory would signify the end of the bourgeois democratic revolution and the beginning of the proletarian socialist revolution.

To strengthen the achievements of the initial phase of the people's democratic revolution, the working class must, as Lenin described, eliminate the bourgeoisie to advance to the socialist phase of the revolution. As stated by Soviet theorists Pavel Yudin and Mark Rozental in their work, A Dictionary of Philosophy, a fundamental requirement for progressing towards a proletarian socialist revolution involved the violent dismantling of the bourgeois dictatorship and the establishment of a dictatorship of the proletariat. By establishing its own exclusive class dictatorship, the proletariat can utilize the state to liquidate capitalism and replace it with socialism, they argued.

According to Sobolev, the proletariat can liquidate capitalism by gradually weakening the bourgeoisie's material base. The key tool in this context is the nationalisation of major industries, banks, transportation systems, and foreign trade that were once the private property of the bourgeoisie. In doing so, the proletariat destroys the material base of the bourgeoisie and other social material forces hostile to the people's democratic revolution. Another benefit, according to Sobolev, is that these made the people in democratic states economically independent of the advanced capitalist states.

The success of the socialist revolution in the Eastern European people's democratic states, Sobolev believed, could be attributed to five factors. Firstly, the revolution occurred at a moment when the correlation of forces was favourable, both domestically and internationally. Secondly, it was not simply a coup d'état, but rather the culmination of the revolution itself. Thirdly, it comprised multiple distinct incidents that collectively formed the revolution. Fourthly, it arose from a combination of grassroots pressure from the populace and pressure from above by state institutions under proletarian control. Lastly, it was achieved without resorting to armed insurrection.
