= Journal of Advanced Manufacturing Systems =

- Discipline: Management
- Language: English
- Edited by: Gopalan Mukundan

Publication details
- History: 2002-present
- Publisher: World Scientific (Singapore)

Standard abbreviations
- ISO 4: J. Adv. Manuf. Syst.

Indexing
- ISSN: 0219-6867 (print); 1793-6896 (web)
- OCLC no.: 637793368

Links
- Journal homepage

The Journal of Advanced Manufacturing Systems is an academic journal founded in 2002 and published by World Scientific. It contains articles relating to advanced manufacturing, in terms of "research and development, product development, process planning, resource planning, applications, and tools". This includes topics such as collaborative design, resource simulation, virtual reality technologies and applications, and supply chain management.

== Abstracting and indexing ==
The journal is abstracted and indexed in Compendex and Inspec.
