= Journal of Biological Systems =

- Discipline: Biology
- Language: English
- Edited by: R.V. Jean

Publication details
- History: 1993–present
- Publisher: World Scientific (Singapore)

Standard abbreviations
- ISO 4: J. Biol. Syst.
- MathSciNet: J. Biol. Systems

Indexing
- ISSN: 0218-3390 (print); 1793-6470 (web)

Links
- Journal homepage

The Journal of Biological Systems was founded in 1993 and is published quarterly by World Scientific.

The journal aims to "promote interdisciplinary approaches in Biology and in Medicine, and the study of biological situations with a variety of tools, including mathematical and general systems methods." It includes articles on complex systems studies, interdisciplinary approaches in biology and medicine, environmental studies, evolutionary biology, medical systems, numerical simulations and computations, and epidemiology.

== Abstracting and indexing ==
The journal is abstracted and indexed in:

- Science Citation Index Expanded
- ISI Alerting Services
- Environment Abstracts
- CSA Biochemistry Abstracts
- CSA Microbiology Abstracts
- CSA Neurosciences Abstracts
- CSA Pollution Abstracts
- CSA Aquatic Sciences and Fisheries Abstracts (ASFA)
- Biological Abstracts
- BIOSIS Preview
- Zentralblatt MATH
- Inspec
- Mathematical Reviews
