= Pensky =

Pensky is a surname. Notable people with the surname include:

- Brian Pensky (born c. 1969), American soccer coach
- Marianna Pensky (fl. 2003), American statistician
