= International Journal of Structural Stability and Dynamics =

- Discipline: Engineering
- Language: English
- Edited by: Y. B. Yang, C. M. Wang, J. N. Reddy

Publication details
- History: 2001-present
- Publisher: World Scientific (Singapore)
- Impact factor: 1.617 (2016)

Standard abbreviations
- ISO 4: Int. J. Struct. Stab. Dyn.

Indexing
- ISSN: 0219-4554 (print); 1793-6764 (web)

Links
- Journal homepage

The International Journal of Structural Stability and Dynamics is a scientific journal published by World Scientific. It was founded in 2001 and covers the stability and dynamics of structures, from conventional land-based structures to micro- and nano-structures, as well as their practical applications.

== Abstracting and indexing ==
The journal is abstracted and indexed in:

- Mathematical Reviews
- CSA Health and Safety Abstracts
- Science Citation Index Expanded
- Current Contents/Engineering, Computing, and Technology
- ISI Alerting Services
- Compendex
- Inspec
