= Journal of Mechanics in Medicine and Biology =

- Discipline: Medicine, bioengineering
- Language: English
- Edited by: Eddie Y.-K. Ng, Tin-Kan Hung, Romano Zannoli

Publication details
- History: 2001-present
- Publisher: World Scientific
- Impact factor: 0.897 (2020)

Standard abbreviations
- ISO 4: J. Mech. Med. Biol.

Indexing
- ISSN: 0219-5194 (print); 1793-6810 (web)
- OCLC no.: 300283843

Links
- Journal homepage

The Journal of Mechanics in Medicine and Biology is a peer-reviewed medical journal that was established in 2001 and is published by World Scientific. It covers research in the field of mechanics as applied to medicine and biology.

== Abstracting and indexing ==
The journal is abstracted and indexed in:

- Academic OneFile
- Academic Search Complete/ Elite/ Premier
- Baidu
- CNKI Scholar
- CnpLINKer
- Compendex
- CrossRef
- CSA Physical Education Abstracts
- Ebsco Discovery Service
- Ebsco Electronic Journal Service (EJS)
- ExLibris Primo Central
- Google Scholar
- Health Reference Center Academic (Gale)
- J-Gate
- Journal Citation Reports/Science Edition
- Naver
- NSTL - National Science and Technology Libraries
- OCLC WorldCat^{®}
- ProQuest SciTech Premium Collection
- Science Citation Index Expanded (SCIE)
- Scopus
- The Summon^{®} Service
- WanFang Data

The journal has a 2020 SCI impact factor of 0.897.
