= Extraordinary State Commission =

Soviet Union government agency

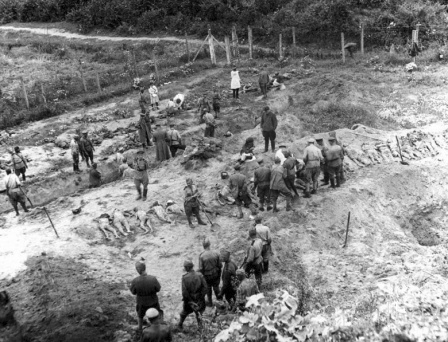
- The Extraordinary State Commission researches the crimes of German Nazis at Janowska concentration camp, 1944
- Date: 1942–1947
- Location: Territories liberated during Soviet counter-offensive; 49°51′15″N 23°59′24″E
- Also known as: Extraordinary State Commission for ascertaining and investigating crimes perpetrated by the German–Fascist invaders and their accomplices
- Cause: War crimes

The Extraordinary State Commission, (Note: Full title: Extraordinary State Commission for the Establishment and Investigation of the Atrocities of the German Fascist Invaders and Their Accomplices and the Damage They Caused to Citizens, Collective Farms, Public Organizations, State Enterprises and Institutions of the USSR (Russian: Чрезвычайная государственная комиссия по установлению и расследованию злодеяний немецко-фашистских захватчиков и их сообщников и причинённого ими ущерба гражданам, колхозам, общественным организациям, государственным предприятиям и учреждениям СССР)) abbreviated ChGK, (Note: Russian: ЧГК) was the state commission of the USSR during the Eastern Front of World War II. The commission was formed by the decree of the Presidium of the Supreme Soviet of the USSR on November 2, 1942.

The decree stipulated that the task of the ChGK was to "take full account of the villainous crimes of the Nazis and the damage they caused to Soviet citizens and the socialist state, to establish the identity of the German fascist criminals with the aim of bringing them to trial and severe punishment; unification and coordination of the work already carried out by the Soviet state bodies in this area."

== History ==
The commission's full ceremonial name was Extraordinary State Commission for Ascertaining and Investigating Crimes Perpetrated by the German-Fascist Invaders and their Accomplices (Russian: Чрезвычайная Государственная Комиссия, ChGK). The official aim of this agency included "punishing for the crimes of the German–fascist aggressors." According to its own data, 32,000 regular organization staff took part in the work of ChGK. On top of that, around 7,000,000 Soviet citizens had participated in the collection of materials and evidence. The first 27 reports published by ChGK constituted the majority of Soviet evidentiary material in the Nuremberg process and the trials of Japanese war criminals. The reports appeared in English in the daily publication Soviet War News issued by the Press Department of the Soviet Embassy in London. The first report, "Protocol on the plunder by the German–Fascist invaders of Rostov Museum at Pyatigorsk", was published on June 28, 1943 and the last report, "Statement on 'Material Damage caused by the German-Fascist invaders to state enterprises and institutions, collective farms, public bodies and citizens of the U.S.S.R'", was published on September 18, 1945. A complete collection of the original 27 communiqués issued by the commission appears in the Soviet Government publication, Soviet Government Statement on Nazi Atrocities.

=== Work of the Commission ===
The facts of atrocities were to be established by acts on the basis of statements by Soviet citizens, interviews of victims, witnesses, medical examinations and inspection of the crime scene. At the same time, it was necessary to establish the perpetrators of the atrocities - the organizers, instigators, perpetrators, accomplices, their names, the names of military units, institutions, organizations. The acts were to contain as accurate a description of the crimes committed as possible. It was necessary to indicate the surname, name, patronymic and place of residence of citizens certifying the fact of atrocity. All relevant documents were to be attached to the acts, such as protocols of interviews, statements of citizens, opinions of medical experts, photographs, letters from Soviet people deported to Germany, German documents, and the like.

Members of the commission and secretariat staff traveled to different republics to help organize the work of local commissions and to monitor their work. They inspected graves and corpses, collected numerous testimonies from witnesses and released prisoners of German prisons and concentration camps, interrogated captured soldiers and officers, studied enemy documents, photographs and other evidence of heinous crimes. In addition, according to Nils Bo Poulsen, some of the crimes for which the Extraordinary State Commission blamed the German side were in fact committed by Soviet state security agencies. In particular, this concerns the execution of prisoners of war near Katyn (in this case, the members of the Commission simply signed a report prepared in advance by the NKVD) and the execution of prisoners in Vinnitsa (the investigation report of which, however, was never published).

The Russian historian Nikita Petrov pointed out that the persons interviewed by the ChGK could not give the names of specific participants in war crimes, and as a result, responsibility was automatically assigned to the leadership of the German army and military administration. Responding to Petrov's remarks, the Hungarian historian Tamas Kraus pointed out that Petrov takes the position of presentism and forgets that in wartime it is much more difficult to identify the perpetrators of crimes and therefore in wartime the role of commanders sharply increases, who “alone have the right and opportunity to curb and discipline their soldiers". According to Kraus, authenticity makes ChGK documents indispensable historical sources for scholars.

== Members of the Commission ==
The decree issued by the Supreme Soviet of the U.S.S.R on 2 November 1942 confirmed the appointment of the following members of the commission:

- Nikolay Shvernik (1888–1970) – chairman
- Academician Nikolay Burdenko (1876–1946)
- Academician Boris Vedenyev (1884–1946)
- Valentina Grizodubova (1909–1993)
- Andrei Zhdanov (1896–1948)
- Nicholas (Yarushevich) – Metropolitan of Kiev and Galicia (1892–1961)
- Academician Trofim Lysenko (1898–1976)
- Academician Yevgeny Tarle (1875–1955)
- Alexey Tolstoy (1882–1945)
- Academician Ilya Trainin (1886–1949)

== List of reports submitted at Nuremberg ==
The Soviet prosecution introduced 31 reports from the Extraordinary State Commission as Exhibits for the prosecution at the International Military Tribunal at Nuremberg.

1. USSR-1 Report of the Extraordinary State Commission on atrocities in the Stavropol region
2. USSR-2 Report of the Extraordinary State Commission on the destruction of industry, etc. in the Stalino region
3. USSR-2(a) Report of a special commission on crimes in Stalino
4. USSR-4 Report of the Extraordinary State Commission on causing death by spreading epidemic of typhus
5. USSR-5 Report of the Extraordinary State Commission on the "Gross-lazarett" in the town of Slavuta
6. USSR-6 Report of the Extraordinary State Commission on crimes in the Lvov region
7. USSR-8 Report of the Extraordinary State Commission on crimes in Auschwitz Nazi death camps
8. USSR-7 Report of the Extraordinary State Commission on atrocities in Lithuania
9. USSR-9 Report of the Extraordinary State Commission on atrocities in Kiev
10. USSR-29 Joint Polish and Soviet report of the Extraordinary State Commission
11. USSR-35 Report of the Extraordinary State Commission on losses sustained by State enterprises and establishments
12. USSR-37 Report of the Extraordinary State Commission on crimes in the city of Kupiansk
13. USSR-38 Report of the Extraordinary State Commission on German crimes in the city of Minsk
14. USSR-39 Report of the Extraordinary State Commission on atrocities in Estonia
15. USSR-40 Report of the Extraordinary State Commission concerning destruction and atrocities in the Pushkin Reservation of the U.S.S.R. Academy of Science
16. USSR-41 Report of the Extraordinary State Commission on crimes in Latvia
17. USSR-42 Report of the Extraordinary State Commission on crimes in the town of Krasnodar and vicinity
18. USSR-43 Report of the Extraordinary State Commission on crimes in Kharkov and vicinity
19. USSR-45 Report of the Extraordinary State Commission on crimes in the town of Rovno and vicinity
20. USSR-46 Report of the Extraordinary State Commission on crimes in Ore1 and vicinity
21. USSR-47 Report of the Extraordinary State Commission on atrocities in the city of Odessa and vicinity
22. USSR-49 Report of the Extraordinary State Commission dated 13 September 1944: destruction of works of art and art treasures
23. USSR-50 Report of the Extraordinary State Commission on the destruction of monuments in Novgorod
24. USSR-54 Report by a special Soviet commission, 24 January 1944, concerning the shooting of Polish officer prisoners of war in the forest of Katyn
25. USSR-55 Report of special Soviet commission on crimes in the city of Krasnodar and vicinity
26. USSR-56 Report of the Extraordinary State Commission on atrocities committed in Smolensk and vicinity
27. USSR-63 Report of the Extraordinary State Commission on crimes in Sevastopol and other cities
28. USSR-246 Report of the Extraordinary State Commission of the Soviet Union concerning destruction of ecclesiastical buildings
29. USSR-248 Report of the Extraordinary State Commission concerning the destruction of Kiev's Psychopathic Institute
30. USSR-249 Report of the Extraordinary State Commission on German atrocities in Kiev
31. USSR-279 Report of the Extraordinary State Commission on crimes in the city of Viazma and others in the Smolensk region
32. USSR-415 Report of the Extraordinary State Commission on crimes committed against Soviet prisoners of war in the camp of Lamsdorf

Only one of these reports, USSR-54 (in German) concerning the Katyn massacre, appears in the English version of the NMT "Blue Series" collection of exhibits. An editor's note states that "the absence of a Soviet editorial staff [made] it impossible to publish any documents in Russian". As a result, of the 51 Soviet prosecution exhibits included in the document collection all are written in either English or German.

== Literature ==
- Alexander E. Epifanow: Die Außerordentliche Staatliche Kommission. Stöcker, Wien 1997.
- Stefan Karner: Zum Umgang mit der historischen Wahrheit in der Sowjetunion. Die "Außerordentliche Staatliche Kommission" 1942 bis 1951. In: W. Wadl (Hg.): Kärntner Landesgeschichte und Archivwissenschaft. Festschrift für Alfred Ogris. Klagenfurt 2001, Seite 508–523.
- Marina Sorokina, People and Procedures. Toward a History of the Investigation of Nazi Crimes in the USSR. In: Kritika. Explorations in Russian and Eurasian History 6, 4 (Fall 2005), 797 - 831.
- Kiril Feferman, "Soviet Investigation of Nazi Crimes in the USSR: Documenting the Holocaust." In Journal of Genocide Research 5, 4 (2003), 587–602
- Andrej Umansky: "Geschichtsschreiber wider Willen? Einblick in die Quellen der „Außerordentlichen Staatlichen Kommission" und der „Zentralen Stelle"", in: A. Nußberger u.a. (Hrsg.), Bewusstes Erinnern und bewusstes Vergessen. Der juristische Umgang mit der Vergangenheit in den Ländern Mittel- und Osteuropas, Tübingen 2011, S. 347–374.
- Sorokina M. On the Way to Nuremberg: The Soviet Commission for the Investigation of Nazi War Crimes // The Nuremberg War Crimes Trial and its Policy Consequences Today / Beth A. Griech-Polelle (ed.). Baden-Baden: Nomos Verlagsgesellschaft, 2009. P. 33–42.
- Lebedeva NS Preparation of the Nuremberg trial / Otv. ed. A. I. Poltorak; Institute of General History of the USSR Academy of Sciences . - M .: Nauka, 1975 .-- 240 p.
- MG Dubik . Extraordinary State Commission // Encyclopedia of the History of Ukraine : in 10 volumes / editor: VA Smoliy (chairman) and others; Institute of History of Ukraine, National Academy of Sciences of Ukraine . - K . : Наук. thought, 2010. - Vol. 7: Ml - O. - P. 156. - 728 p. : il. - ISBN 978-966-00-1061-1.
- Extraordinary State Commission for the Establishment and Investigation of the Crimes of the Nazi Invaders // Legal Encyclopedia : [in 6 vols.] / Ed. count Yu. S. Shemshuchenko (ed.) [Etc.] - K . : Ukrainian encyclopedia named after MP Bazhana, 2002. - T. 4: N - P. - 720 s. - ISBN 966-7492-04-4 .
