= The Hong Kong Journal of Social Work =

- Discipline: Social work
- Language: Chinese, English

Publication details
- History: 1967-present
- Publisher: World Scientific (Singapore)

Standard abbreviations
- ISO 4: Hong Kong J. Soc. Work

Indexing
- ISSN: 0219-2462

Links
- Journal homepage

The Hong Kong Journal of Social Work is a bilingual academic journal published by the Hong Kong Social Workers Association Limited in collaboration with World Scientific in English and Chinese. It emphasizes articles related to the field of social work, written in the local context.

== Abstracting and indexing ==
The journal is indexed by Sociological Abstracts and the International Bibliography of the Social Sciences.
