= Journal of Environmental Assessment Policy and Management =

- Discipline: Management, economics, engineering, environmental science
- Language: English
- Edited by: Farhad Taghizadeh-Hesary

Publication details
- History: 1999-present
- Publisher: World Scientific Publishing (Singapore)
- Frequency: Quarterly

Standard abbreviations
- ISO 4: J. Environ. Assess. Policy Manag.

Indexing
- ISSN: 1464-3332 (print); 1757-5605 (web)

Links
- Journal homepage

The Journal of Environmental Assessment Policy and Management is a quarterly peer-reviewed academic journal covering policy and decision-making relating to environmental assessment in the broadest sense. The focus of the journal is on policy, procedures and law covering project and policy formulation, development and implementation, public participation, and the institutional basis for environmental assessment. The journal was established in 1999 and is published by World Scientific Publishing. The editor-in-chief is Farhad Taghizadeh-Hesary (Tokai University).

== Abstracting and indexing ==
The journal is abstracted and indexed in:

- Academic OneFile
- Biological Abstracts
- BIOSIS Previews
- CAB Abstracts
- CSA Human Population and the Environment Abstracts
- CSA Meteorological & Geoastrophysical Abstracts
- CSA Pollution Abstracts
- CSA Selected Water Resources Abstracts
- CSA Toxicology Abstracts
- EBSCO databases
- Geobase
- International Bibliography of the Social Sciences
- ProQuest databases
- RePEC
- Scopus
