= Doreen Liu =

Singaporean businesswoman and philanthropist

Doreen Liu is a Singaporean businesswoman and philanthropist.

Doreen Liu graduated from Birmingham University with a BSocSc degree in Economics, Politics and Sociology in 1970. Liu is Managing Director of World Scientific Publishing which she co-founded in Singapore in 1981. She is Treasurer of the International Women's Forum. She has served as Chair of the Publishing Association of Singapore. She has been Chair of the Publishing Committee of the Singapore-British Business Council. She has also served as chair of the Printing and Publishing Advisory Committee. Liu received the Entrepreneurship Excellence Award in 1990, organised by the Entrepreneurship Development Centre. She received the Entrepreneur of the Year Award for Women in Asia in 2010, organised by RBS Coutts and the Financial Times. In 2014, together with her husband Kok Khoo Phua, she donated £1 million of ebooks to Birmingham University's new library.
