= Journal of Bioinformatics and Computational Biology =

- Discipline: Computer science, Biology
- Language: English
- Edited by: Limsoon Wong, Ming Li, John Wooley

Publication details
- History: 2003-present
- Publisher: World Scientific

Standard abbreviations
- ISO 4: J. Bioinform. Comput. Biol.

Indexing
- ISSN: 0219-7200 (print); 1757-6334 (web)

Links
- Journal homepage

The Journal of Bioinformatics and Computational Biology was founded in 2003 and is published by World Scientific. The journal covers analysis of cellular information, especially in the technical aspect. The managing editor is Limsoon Wong (National University of Singapore).

== Abstracting and indexing ==
The journal is abstracted and indexed in:

- Index Medicus
- BIOSIS Previews
- Biological Abstracts
- MEDLINE
- CompuScience
- Scopus
- Inspec
