= International Journal of Innovation Management =

- Discipline: Management
- Language: English
- Edited by: Joe Tidd

Publication details
- History: 1997-present
- Publisher: Imperial College Press

Standard abbreviations
- ISO 4: Int. J. Innov. Manag.

Indexing
- ISSN: 1363-9196 (print); 1757-5877 (web)

Links
- Journal homepage

The International Journal of Innovation Management is the official journal of the International Society of Professional Innovation Management. The journal, founded in 1997, is published by Imperial College Press. It is peer-reviewed, and offers insight on handling various aspects of innovation, from research to new product development, from a management perspective.

== Abstracting and indexing ==
The journal is abstracted and indexed in the International Bibliography of the Social Sciences and Inspec.

The Scopus impact factor in 2022 is 2.333.
