= Marianna Pensky =

Russian mathematician

Marianna Pensky is a professor at the University of Central Florida. Her research interests lie in the areas of theoretical and applied statistics.

In 1995, Pensky became the first woman faculty in UCF Department of Mathematics. Her work at University of Central Florida serves as a role model for women in mathematics and STEM fields. She has served on numerous MSc and Doctoral committees. In 2023, she was designated as a Pegasus Professor, the highest university award by UCF. Her work ranged in focus from computer science, statistical genetics and population biology.

She is author of The Stress-strength Model and Its Generalizations: Theory and Applications (World Scientific Publishing, 2003).

She is a Member of the Steering Committee of the International Society for NonParametric Statistics (ISNPS)(? -2026). In 2020, Pensky was inducted as a Fellow of the Institute of Mathematical Statistics. Pensky serves as an executive editor of the Journal of Statistical Planning and Inference.

Pensky was elected as a Fellow of the American Statistical Association in 2023.
