= People's democratic state =

Communist state form

A people's democratic state is a communist state formation. According to the Marxist–Leninist concept of people's democracy, a people's democratic state attempts to transition society from a capitalist mode of production to a socialist mode of production after a successful people's democratic revolution. This process transforms the people's democratic state into a socialist state.

According to some Marxist–Leninist theorists, the people's democratic state is socialist-type state, but not a socialist state itself. The form of government of people's democratic states is unified state power of the supreme state organ of power, under the leadership of the ruling communist party. Despite this, forms of government have not always been identical in different states, with some slight institutional differences.

Laos is the only existing state that currently self-designates as a people's democratic state.

== Basic definition ==
Soviet theorists developed two broad, though largely similar, definitions of a people's democracy. In 1955, Mark Rozental described it as a new political form that had emerged in parts of Europe and Asia following the defeat of Germany and Japan under a Soviet-led anti-fascist coalition, combined with the successes of national liberation movements. A year earlier, the Great Soviet Encyclopedia had defined a people's democracy in class terms, arguing that, depending on historical circumstances, it could embody either a proletarian dictatorship or a joint dictatorship of the proletariat and peasantry. The journal Bolshevik framed it differently, presenting a people's democracy as a "higher" form of democracy than bourgeois parliamentarism, marked by the participation of workers and peasants in state administration and the extension of political rights to the masses. Together, these definitions reveal three distinct emphases: Rozental stressed the historical forces that gave rise to these states, the Great Soviet Encyclopedia highlighted their class character, and Bolshevik emphasised their supposed democratic potential.

Western scholars, by contrast, offered more varied interpretations. French academic George Vedel described a people's democracy as a regime in countries that had not advanced as far toward socialism as the Soviet Union, and thus could not be called "Soviet" in the proper sense. Georges Burdeau characterised it as a transitional form of government that sought to achieve a communist revolution through legal and orderly means. American scholar Zbigniew Brzezinski, later national security advisor to President Jimmy Carter, viewed a people's democracy as a hybrid system. Unlike the orthodox model of the proletarian dictatorship, he argued, political power in these states was formally shared among broad national coalitions and, in practice, rested on an alliance of workers and peasants, with neither class exercising full hegemony. For Brzezinski, a people's democratic state was therefore neither a conventional bourgeois state nor a fully developed socialist state.

== Class makeup ==
The first orthodox theory of a people's democracy was formulated by Soviet scholar E. S. Lazutkin, who concluded that a people's democratic state was essentially similar to the Soviet socialist state, with both representing forms of the proletarian dictatorship. This interpretation was reinforced at the 5th Congress of the Bulgarian Communist Party in December 1948, when Georgi Dimitrov—after personal discussions with Stalin and other Soviet leaders—stated that, according to Marxism–Leninism, a Soviet state and a people's democratic state represented two distinct state forms, but that they nonetheless shared the same class makeup. In a people's democratic state, the proletariat acted as the ruling class, leading a broad alliance of the workers from both rural and urban areas. This meant that a people's democracy was not identical to the Soviet proletarian dictatorship, but it still constituted a form of proletarian rule. Dimitrov further stressed that the class makeup of a state was primary to its organisational form, arguing that even states without a communist form of government could reasonably be designated as people's democracies if their content was essentially proletarian in nature, since "The content of the people's democracy is the dictatorship of the proletariat."

Like the proletarian dictatorship in the socialist state, the new proletarian form of class rule in a people's democratic state was tasked with transitioning society from capitalism to socialism. Dimitrov told the congress that the universal principles of history, when viewed through a historical materialist lens, remained consistent from country to country. Thus, the only path to socialism was the establishment of a proletarian dictatorship directed against capitalism, as had been achieved in the Soviet Union. Following Dimitrov's address, leaders of other Eastern European communist parties delivered similar statements. Several theoretical works elaborated on these ideas, most notably Naum Farberov's 1949 The State of People's Democracy, which was approved by the Soviet Ministry of Higher Education as a university textbook.

Farberov, along with Aleksander Sobolev, criticised earlier theorists such as Ilya Trainin and Eugen Varga, who had argued that a people's democratic state represented a third type of state, neither socialist nor capitalist. Farberov countered that a people's democratic state was of a socialist type. The existence of a mixed economy did not alter this essential feature, since the decisive factor was its proletarian class makeup and the fact that the socialist sector owned and controlled the commanding heights of the economy. From this point onward, the dominant conception was that people's democracies were socialist states born from people's democratic revolutions, which themselves constituted a form of socialist revolution. Soviet theorists conceded that differences existed among states, but these were attributed not to unique national paths, but to variations in their base and superstructure. Farberov concluded that all were traveling along the same road, guided by the same universal laws. He defined people's democratic states as "states of the toiling classes headed by the proletariat, states which represent the transitional stage from capitalism to socialism, states of a new, socialist type".

Boris Mankovsky reached the same conclusion, characterising people's democracies as "states of the transition from capitalism to socialism, states in which socialism is being built". Like Farberov, he maintained that a people's democratic state was a socialist-type state, since, like its Soviet counterpart, it was a transitory state under the rule of the working class. He also defined a people's democratic revolution as a socialist revolution that aimed to fulfill the same historical tasks. The key distinction was that people's democracies also had to carry out certain bourgeois–democratic responsibilities, such as abolishing remnants of feudalism and implementing land reform. The adoption of some capitalist policies did not, in Mankovsky's view, undermine their socialist character, since the working class retained political leadership. To call a people's democratic revolution a bourgeois democratic revolution, he insisted, was anti-Marxist.

Dmitry Chesnokov, a philosopher who later joined the Presidium of the Central Committee, argued in 1948 that a Soviet state, as established by Lenin and Stalin, represented a superior type of socialist state compared to people's democracies. While acknowledging that dictatorships of the proletariat had been established in people's democracies, Chesnokov considered them a unique state form shaped by the relationship and balance of class forces within those countries, the political maturity of the working masses, the global struggle between socialism and imperialism, and the diverse methods by which nations pursued socialism.

Chesnokov further emphasised the decisive influence of the Soviet Union in shaping the development of people's democracies. He maintained that the Soviet example ensured their ability to fulfill the responsibilities of proletarian dictatorships, and that without the support and existence of the Soviet socialist state, these states would have faced severe obstacles in the transition from capitalism to socialism.

Pavel Yudin, later a candidate of the Presidium of the 19th Congress of the Communist Party of the Soviet Union, similarly argued that the class form of a people's democracy represented a new form of proletarian dictatorship. In essence, it was identical to Soviet power, differing only in its historical circumstances. He reasoned that "The content of a People's Democracy, as also of Soviet power, is determined by the Marxist–Leninist leadership of the Communist Party." József Révai, a leading member of the Hungarian Working People's Party, agreed, asserting: "We must liquidate the concept that the working class shares its power with other classes. In this concept, we find the remnants of a viewpoint according to which a People's Democracy is some quite specific kind of state which differs from the Soviet not only in its form, but also in its essence and functions."

Communist Albania and Yugoslavia, however, rejected the notion that people's democracies constituted a new state form. According to Zbigniew Brzezinski, the Albanian constitution "unabashedly copied the Soviet constitution of 1936". Yugoslav leaders, meanwhile, objected to the very premise. As Josip Broz Tito argued, the Communist Party of Yugoslavia (CPY) had destroyed the state structure of the Kingdom of Yugoslavia. Edvard Kardelj, a CPY politburo member, contended in his 1949 article "On People's Democracy in Yugoslavia" that the Yugoslav experience had been a socialist revolution, not a people's democracy: "In view of the fact that our Revolution began to develop in the conditions of the National Liberation War, in its first phase it possessed the form of a People's Democracy, but, in view of its class forces and the internal relationship of these forces, it could in fact only be a Socialist revolution."

=== The proletariat and the peasantry ===
Despite affirming that a people's democratic state was a socialist-like state, theorists argued that it possessed two distinct class makeups. In its first phase, the bourgeois democratic revolution, the state was defined as a revolutionary–democratic dictatorship of the proletariat and peasantry. Once this phase was completed and the revolution transitioned into a proletarian socialist revolution, the state's class makeup shifted to a proletarian dictatorship. The first phase was brief, lasting from 1944 to 1946/47, and was characterised by relatively less repressive policies toward non-communist elements.

According to Boris Mankovsky, the first phase had four essential tasks to carry out in order to lay the groundwork for the second phase. First, it had to serve as a unifying force against fascism and get rid of the remnants of feudalism. Second, it was required to introduce measures that undermined the material basis of capitalism. Third, it needed to promote democracy in both the social and economic spheres. Fourth, it had to rebuild the national economy in the aftermath of the devastation caused by the Second World War. Naum Farberov later added a fifth task: transform the material foundation of society so that the class dynamics themselves were fundamentally altered.

By 1948, in most Eastern European people's democracies, this first phase—combining the proletariat and the peasantry—had evolved into a purely proletarian dictatorship. Aleksander Sobolev outlined five conditions that he considered necessary for the establishment of a genuine proletarian dictatorship. First, the communist party had to secure a monopoly on political power and assert greater authority than any non-communist party. Second, the bourgeoisie had to be eliminated as a relevant power, with all of its representatives removed from positions of influence. Third, all significant state offices had to be occupied by communists. Fourth, the state was required to assume control over the important parts of the economy. Finally, the communist party had to absorb or merge with other non-communist workers' parties to form a single, unified Marxist–Leninist party.

== Using the state for the construction of socialism ==
According to Marxism–Leninism, the state has a defined purpose in society: it reflects the material base of society and is born from it. Over time, however, every state formation develops independent powers and becomes alienated from the society it represents, ultimately functioning as a weapon of the ruling class to defend its own interests. Through this, the state is transformed into a coercive and repressive tool. Marxist–Leninists say that all pre-socialist states existed to defend the exclusive interests of the ruling class while exploiting classes below.

Marxism–Leninism acknowledges that the socialist state under the proletarian dictatorship is also a forceful organisation. However, unlike previous states, it operates in the interests of the vast majority, since its ultimate purpose is class abolition rather than its own preservation. Within this system, a people's democratic state under the dictatorship of the proletariat and peasantry was primarily concerned with what Nikolay Aleksandrov identified as the general tasks of democratisation and national liberation. American scholar Zbigniew Brzezinski similarly observed that people's democratic states combined elements of both terror and reform.

According to Marxist–Leninist theorists such as Aleksandrov, a people's democratic state under a proletarian dictatorship fulfilled three principal functions: repression, education, and construction. Repression referred to defense of the state's class makeup against attempts to change it. Education involved efforts to teach communist values. Construction denoted the responsibility of the proletarian state to build socialism and lay the foundation for the eventual abolition of classes—also known as communism.

Under the proletarian dictatorship, a people's democratic state was expected to perform similar to the Soviet state during its transition to socialism, albeit with some differences. Soviet theorist Pyotr Romashkin identified six internal and two external traits of the Soviet socialist state. The internal traits were the suppression of enemies to the regime, an emphasis on economic and organisational matters, the regulation of labour and consumption, the keeping of socialist production relations, the advancement of cultural and educational initiatives, and the protection of citizens' legal rights and interests. These were presented hierarchically, with repression of adversaries placed as the foremost function. The two external traits were the keeping of the peace, and, closely connected to it, military defense.

A key distinction between the Soviet state and the people's democratic states was the extent of violence used. Dmitry Chesnokov argued that the international connection of forces allowed the people's democracies to adopt less repressive measures and use less violence than had been used in the Soviet Union. Similarly, Aleksander Sobolev rejected Stalin's theory that class struggle under socialism rose, contending that while class struggle persisted during the transition from capitalism to socialism, its overall intensity was noticeably reduced.

== Organisation of state power ==
At first, people's democratic states were regarded by Soviet theorists such as Eugen Varga as a hybrid-kind of a state, not fully socialist nor bourgeois. This view implied that the previous state was not completely demolished but instead transformed. By 1949, however, this interpretation was largely abandoned. As Naum Farberov explained, "The content of a People's Democracy, as also of Soviet power, is determined by the Marxist–Leninist leadership of the Communist Party." In practice, the communist party was understood to stand above all other parties in the people's democratic states, and, by virtue of its control over the supreme state organ of power, its leadership was considered absolute.

In this organisational form of state power, the supreme state organ of power was granted the unified authority of the state. In Poland, for example, Bolesław Bierut, first secretary of the Polish United Workers' Party, declared at the adoption of the Constitution of the Polish People's Republic that the separation of powers was "artificial and contrary to the principles of democracy". It was also concluded that "In a real people's state there is no room for any 'competition' of organs." Instead of dividing powers, people's democracies established a uniform state system in which all authority flowed upward from the lowest-level state departments to the supreme state organ of power. In each Eastern European people's democracy, this body stood above the constitution: it concentrated the unified power of the state, was not accountable to other institutions, and held the authority to amend the constitution at will.

Farberov and other theorists argued that people's democracies represented a decisive break with bourgeois state forms. They acknowledged that, unlike the October Revolution, the people's democracies had not abolished the old state system in one stroke but had gradually transformed it through deliberate efforts. The Soviet party's theoretical journal Bolshevik affirmed that the general laws of the transition from capitalism to socialism, discovered by Karl Marx, developed by Lenin and Joseph Stalin, and tested in the Soviet Union, were universally binding. This meant that the Soviet organisational form of state power was expected to be reproduced across the people's democratic states.

In their initial moves to establish a new organisational form of state power, communists in Bulgaria and Romania abolished their monarchies, which they considered outdated. In each case, the transformation into a people's democracy was soon formalised by the adoption of new constitutions, heavily inspired by the Soviet model. Before the Soviet-led push to standardise state structures across the Eastern Bloc, however, some people's democracies considered adding distinctive institutional features. In Bulgaria, for example, an early draft constitution proposed a Western-style presidency. Ultimately, Soviet influence was unmistakable. As Farberov noted in 1950, "All the basic principles and institutions of the people's democratic states bear on them the stamp of the beneficent influence of the Stalin Constitution."

According to Francis J. Kase, the two most original Eastern European constitutions were those of Czechoslovakia and East Germany, both of which differed from the Soviet model by permitting an individual head of state. In Czechoslovakia, the presidency—elected by the supreme state organ of power—retained real sway over state operations. The East German constitution initially stopped short of explicitly instituting the communist form of government. By 1952, however, it had become indistinguishable from the Soviet model. As Otto Grotewohl, East Germany's head of government, explained: "The Workers' and Peasants' Authority in the GDR is the state form of the dictatorship of the proletariat under our special national conditions."

Marxist economist Pyotr Figurnov stressed that the chief difference between the Soviet socialist state and the people's democracies lay in the presence of other political parties. In his view, these parties formed a coalition that accepted the leading role of the communist party as the forefront of the working class and the common folk, and they acknowledged its monopoly on state power. This was described as a multi-class coalition representing the vast majority of the population. Aleksander Sobolev also identified the multi-party system as a defining feature of people's democracies, but he made clear that this pluralism existed only to support the working class and that the state remained under the undisputed leadership of the communist party.

== People's democratic states around the world ==
At first, the new European communist states were called new democracies. According to Soviet Hungarian theorist Eugen Varga, there existed five new democratic states in 1946: Albania, Bulgaria, Czechoslovakia, Poland, and Yugoslavia. Another Soviet theorist, Naum Farberov, listed Albania, Bulgaria, Czechoslovakia, Hungary, Mongolia, North Korea, Poland, and Romania as people's democratic states in 1949, while removing Yugoslavia due to the Tito–Stalin split of 1948. Farberov did not include China and East Germany in his list. In 1959, the Soviet Union officially recognised 11 states as people's democracies: Albania, Bulgaria, China, Czechoslovakia, East Germany, Hungary, Mongolia, North Korea, Poland, Romania, and Vietnam.

The Lao People's Revolutionary Party seized power through a people's national democratic revolution. It established a Laotian communist state on 2 December 1975, which it self-designated as a people's democratic state. The Constitution of Laos, adopted in 1991, declared it a people's democratic state based on the multi-ethnic Laotian people of all social classes, with the workers, farmers, and intellectuals as the state's primary class foundation. The party declared its foundational aim was to establish socialism in Laos at the 5th Congress of the Lao People's Revolutionary Party, held in 1991.
