= Journal of Integrative Neuroscience =

- Discipline: Neuroscience
- Language: English
- Edited by: Zhong Chen and Bettina Platt

Publication details
- History: 2002–present
- Publisher: IMR Press
- Frequency: Monthly
- Open access: Yes
- License: Creative Commons Attribution
- Impact factor: 3.3 (2025)

Standard abbreviations
- ISO 4: J. Integr. Neurosci.

Indexing
- ISSN: 0219-6352 (print); 1757-448X (web)
- LCCN: 2003201350
- OCLC no.: 260034491

Links
- Journal homepage; Online archive

The Journal of Integrative Neuroscience is a peer-reviewed scientific journal of neuroscience. It was published by World Scientific from 2002 to 2016, then IOS Press in 2017, and is now published by IMR Press since 2018. The editors-in-chief are Zhong Chen and Bettina Platt.

== Abstracting and indexing ==
The journal is abstracted and indexed in:

- BIOSIS Previews
- Biological Abstracts
- Embase
- Index Medicus/MEDLINE/PubMed
- Science Citation Index Expanded
- Scopus
- Directory of Open Access Journals (DOAJ)
- China National Knowledge Infrastructure (CNKI)

According to the Journal Citation Reports, the journal has a 2025 impact factor of 3.3.
