= Joseph Tidd =

British physicist

- Born: 1960 (age 65–66)
- Education: University of Sussex (PhD)
- Scientific career
- Workplaces: Science Policy Research Unit
- Website: https://sites.google.com/view/profjoetidd/home

Joseph Tidd (born 1960) is a British physicist and Professor of technology and innovation management at Science Policy Research Unit. He is the editor of the International Journal of Innovation Management.

== Books ==
- Tidd, Joe; Bessant, John (2009). Managing Innovation: Integrating Technological, Market and Organizational Change 4e - first ed. with Keith Pavitt. Chichester: Wiley.
