= Phua Kok Khoo =

Singaporean publisher, academic, and philanthropist

Phua Kok Khoo (Chinese: 潘國駒; pinyin: Pān Guójū) is a Singaporean publisher, academic, and philanthropist.

== About ==
Phua is the son of late Teochew merchant and community figure Phua Chay Long (Chinese: 潘醒農; pinyin: Pān Xǐngnóng). Graduated from the University of Birmingham with a PhD in Mathematical Physics in 1970, he is Chairman and Editor-in-Chief of World Scientific Publishing, Asia's largest international scientific publishing company, which he founded in Singapore in 1981. He is the founding director of the Institute of Advanced Studies at Nanyang Technological University, as well as an adjunct professor in the Department of Physics at the National University of Singapore.

In 2009 Phua was elected as Fellow of the American Physical Society for his contributions to research and education in physics. He was awarded the American Physical Society President's Award by the institute of Physics Singapore Council in 2006, for his contributions to physics research and education in Singapore. Phua was awarded the honorary degree of Doctor of Science (DSc) by the University of Birmingham in Singapore in 2013. In 2014 Phua donated e-books worth £1 million to the University of Birmingham's new library.
