= Communist state =

Form of government

A map of current communist states (China, Cuba, Laos, North Korea and Vietnam)

A communist state, also known as a Marxist–Leninist state, is a socio-economic form of government that combines the state leadership of a communist party, Marxist–Leninist political philosophy, and an official commitment to the construction of a communist society. Modern communism grew out of the socialist movement in 19th-century Europe as a program to replace capitalism with a stateless, classless, and moneyless society, but its application as Marxism–Leninism began later in the Soviet Union under Joseph Stalin. China, Cuba, Laos, North Korea and Vietnam are the only communist states that exist as of 2026. With the exception of North Korea, these have moved away from collectivism in the economic sphere in favor of forms of market economy, but retain an authoritarian or totalitarian single-party system generating a mandatory state ideology.

In the 20th century, several communist states were established, first in Russia with the Russian Revolution of 1917 and then in portions of Eastern Europe, Asia, and other regions after World War II. The institutions of these states were heavily influenced by the writings of Karl Marx, Friedrich Engels, Vladimir Lenin, Joseph Stalin and others. However, the political reforms of Soviet leader Mikhail Gorbachev known as Perestroika and socio-economic difficulties produced the revolutions of 1989, which brought down all communist states of the Eastern Bloc. The repercussions of the collapse of these states contributed to political transformations in non-European communist states.

In accordance with Marx's theory of the state, communists believe all state formations are under the control of a ruling class. Communist states are no different, and the ruling communist party is defined as the vanguard party of the most class conscious section of the working classes, particularly the proletariat but sometimes including the peasantry, such as under its Maoist formulation. Communist states usually affirm that the working class is the state's ruling class and that the most class-conscious workers lead the state through the communist party, establishing the dictatorship of the proletariat as its class system and, by extension, the socialist state, which will eventually wither away into a communist society free of oppressions. However, not all communist states chose to form this class system, and some, such as Laos, have opted to establish a people's democratic state instead, in which the working class shares political power with other classes. According to this belief system, communist states need to establish an economic base to support the ruling class system by creating a socialist economy, or at the very least, some socialist property relations strong enough to support the communist class system. By ensuring these two features, the communist party seeks to make Marxism–Leninism the guiding ideology of the state. Normally, the communist state constitution defines the class system, political, economic system and guiding ideology of the state.

The political systems of these states are based on the principles of democratic centralism and unified power. Democratic centralism seeks to centralise powers in the highest leadership and, in theory, reach political decisions through democratic processes. Unified power is the opposite of the separation of powers and seeks to turn the national representative organ elected through non-competitive, controlled elections into the state's single branch of government. This institution is commonly called the supreme state organ of power, and a ruling communist party normally holds at least two-thirds of the seats in this body. The supreme state organ of power has unlimited powers except for the limits it has set itself by adopting constitutional and legal limits. What would be considered the executive or judicial branches in a liberal democratic system are in communist states considered part of the supreme state organ of power. The supreme state organ of power usually adopts a constitution that explicitly gives the ruling communist party leadership of the state.

The communist party controls the supreme state organ of power through the political discipline it exerts on its members and, through them, dominates the state. Ruling communist parties of these states are organised on Leninist lines, in which the party congress functions as its supreme decision-making body. In between two congresses, the central committee acts as the supreme organ. When neither the party congress nor the central committee is in session, the decision-making authorities of these organs are normally delegated to its politburo, which makes political decisions, and a secretariat, which executes the decisions made by the party congress, central committee and the politburo. These organs are composed of leading figures from state and party organs. The leaders of these parties are often given the title of general secretary, but the power of this office varies from state to state. Some states are characterised by one-man dominance and the cult of personality, while others are run by a collective leadership, a system in which powers are more evenly distributed between leading officials and decision-making organs are more institutionalised.

These states seek to mobilise the public to participate in state affairs by implementing the transmission belt principle, meaning that the communist party seeks to maintain close contact with the masses through mass organisations and other institutions that try to encompass everyone and not only committed communists. Other methods are through coercion and political campaigns. Some have criticised these methods as dictatorial since the communist party remains the centre of power. Others emphasise that these are examples of communist states with functioning political participation processes (i.e. Soviet democracy) involving other non-party organisations such as direct democratic participation, factory committees, and trade unions.

== Etymology ==
No state that is conventionally described as a "communist state" has ever officially referred to itself in those terms. In practice, such states have employed a variety of alternative designations—national-democratic, people's democratic, socialist-oriented, or workers' and peasants' states—to emphasize their self-understanding as communist party-run polities since none of them have claimed to establish a communist mode of production. As David Ramsay Steele observes, the label communist state originated with external commentators: "Among Western journalists, the term 'Communist' came to refer exclusively to regimes and movements associated with the Communist International and its offspring: regimes which insisted that they were not communist but socialist, and movements which were barely communist in any sense at all."

These states generally identify themselves as socialist states, on the grounds that they do not claim to have achieved communism. Within Marxist theory, communism presupposes a stateless society, so the very notion of a "communist state" would be oxymoronic. The economist Jozef Wilczynski explains: "Contrary to Western usage, these countries describe themselves as 'Socialist' (not 'Communist'). The second stage (Marx's 'higher phase'), or 'Communism,' is to be marked by an age of plenty, distribution according to needs (not work), the absence of money and the market mechanism, the disappearance of the last vestiges of capitalism and the ultimate withering away of the State."

Other scholars emphasise the same point. John Barkley Rosser Jr. and Marina Rosser note that Karl Marx himself envisaged communism as entailing the eventual withering away of the state, with the dictatorship of the proletariat conceived as a strictly transitional arrangement. "Well aware of this," they write, "the Soviet Communists never claimed to have achieved communism, always labelling their own system socialist rather than communist and viewing their system as in transition to communism." Similarly, Raymond Williams traces the modern terminological divide to 1918, when the Russian Social Democratic Labour Party (Bolsheviks) reconstituted itself as the All-Russian Communist Party (Bolsheviks). From that point onward, "a distinction of socialist from communist, often with supporting definitions such as social democrat or democratic socialist, became widely current, although it is significant that all communist parties, in line with earlier usage, continued to describe themselves as socialist and dedicated to socialism."

From the standpoint of Western political science, however, the term communist state remains analytically useful, insofar as such states display a common institutional pattern. According to scholars Stephen White, John Gardner, and George Schöpflin, four features define them: (1) the adoption of Marxism–Leninism as the official state ideology (though not necessarily adhered to in practice by every leader); (2) the predominance of state ownership and centralized economic planning; (3) a one-party state dominated by a highly centralized and disciplined communist party, sometimes alongside subordinate parties; and (4) the party's constitutionally enshrined leading role in both state and society.

== Overview ==
A map of current communist states and past states which have had a communist form of government

=== Development ===
During the 20th century, the world's first constitutionally communist state was Soviet Russia at the end of 1917. In 1922, it joined other former territories of the empire to become the Soviet Union. After World War II, the Soviet Army occupied much of Eastern Europe and helped bring the existing communist parties to power in those countries. Originally, the communist states in Eastern Europe were allied with the Soviet Union. Yugoslavia would declare itself non-aligned, and Albania later took a different path. After a war against Japanese occupation and a civil war resulting in a Communist victory, the People's Republic of China was established in 1949. Communist states were also established in Cambodia, Cuba, Laos, North Korea, and Vietnam. In 1989, the communist states in Eastern Europe collapsed after the Iron Curtain broke under public pressure during a wave of mostly non-violent movements as part of the Revolutions of 1989 which led to the dissolution of the Soviet Union in 1991. China's socio-economic structure has been referred to as "nationalistic state capitalism" and the Eastern Bloc (Eastern Europe and the Third World) as "bureaucratic-authoritarian systems."

=== Institutions ===
Communist states share similar institutions, which are organised on the premise that the communist party is a vanguard of the proletariat and represents the long-term interests of the people. The doctrine of democratic centralism, developed by Vladimir Lenin as a set of principles to be used in the internal affairs of the communist party, is extended to society at large. According to democratic centralism, the people must elect all leaders, and all proposals must be debated openly, but once a decision has been reached, all people have a duty to account to that decision. When used within a political party, democratic centralism is meant to prevent factionalism and splits. When applied to an entire state, democratic centralism creates a one-party system. The constitutions of most communist states describe their political system as a form of democracy. They recognise the sovereignty of the people as embodied in a series of representative parliamentary institutions. Such states do not have a separation of powers and instead have one national legislative body (such as the Supreme Soviet in the Soviet Union), which is bestowed with Unified power and is often defined as the supreme state organ of power. Unified power means that the supreme state organ of power (SSOP) holds unlimited state power, but per the division of labour of state organs it delegates these powers through the communist state constitution to the supreme executive and administrative organ, supreme judicial organ, the supreme procuratorial organ, and other organs it deems necessary.

In communist states, the SSOP often have a similar structure to the parliaments in liberal republics, with two significant differences. First, the deputies elected to these unified SSOPs are not expected to represent the interests of any particular constituency but rather the long-term interests of the people as a whole; and second, against Karl Marx's advice, the SSOPs are not in permanent session. Instead, they convene once or several times yearly in sessions that usually last only a few days. When the SSOP is not in session, its powers are transferred to a smaller council (often called a presidium) which acts as a collective head of state. In some systems, the presidium is composed of crucial communist party members who vote the resolutions of the communist party into law.

A feature of communist states is the existence of numerous state-sponsored social organisations (associations of journalists, teachers, writers and other professionals, consumer cooperatives, sports clubs, trade unions, youth organisations, and women's organisations) which are integrated into the political system. In communist states, the social organisations are expected to promote social unity and cohesion, to serve as a link between the government and society and to provide a forum for the recruitment of new communist party members.

Historically, the political organisation of many socialist states has been dominated by a one-party monopoly. Some communist governments such as those in China, Czechoslovakia, or East Germany have or had more than one political party, but all minor parties are or were required to follow the leadership of the communist party. In communist states, the government may not tolerate criticism of policies that have already been implemented in the past or are being implemented in the present.

== State ==
According to Marxist–Leninist thought, the state is a repressive institution led by a ruling class. This class dominates the state and expresses its will through it. By formulating law, the ruling class uses the state to oppress other classes and form a class dictatorship. However, the goal of the communist state is to abolish that state. The Soviet Russia Constitution of 1918 stated: "The principal object of the Constitution of the R.S.F.S.R., which is adapted to the present transition period, consists in the establishment of a dictatorship of the urban and rural proletariat and the poorest peasantry, in the form of a powerful All-Russian Soviet power; the object of which is to secure complete suppression of the bourgeoisie, the abolition of exploitation of man by man, and the establishment of Socialism, under which there shall be neither class division nor state authority". The communist state is the dictatorship of the proletariat, where the advanced elements of the proletariat are the ruling class. In Marxist–Leninist thinking, the socialist state is the last repressive state since the next stage of development is that of pure communism, a classless and stateless society. Friedrich Engels commented on the state, writing: "State interference in social relations, becomes, in one domain after another, superfluous, and then dies out of itself; the government of persons is replaced by the administration of things, and by the conduct of processes of production. The state is not 'abolished'. It dies out."

In "The Tax in Kind", Vladimir Lenin argued: "No one, I think, in studying the question of the economic system of Russia, has denied its transitional character. Nor, I think, has any Communist denied that the term Soviet Socialist Republic implies the determination of the Soviet power to achieve the transition to socialism, and not that the existing economic system is recognised as a socialist order." The introduction of the first five-year plan in the Soviet Union got many communists to believe that the withering away of the state was imminent. However, Joseph Stalin warned that the withering away of the state would not occur until after the socialist mode of production had achieved dominance over capitalism. Specifically, socialism would have to be achieved in the majority of or in all countries, and the "capitalist encirclement" of the Soviet Union would have to be replaced by a "socialist encirclement" for the state to wither away in a developed communist society. Soviet jurist Andrey Vyshinsky echoed this assumption and said that the socialist state was necessary "in order to defend, to secure, and to develop relationships and arrangements advantageous to the workers, and to annihilate completely capitalism and its remnants."

Ideology permeates these states. According to scholar Peter Tang, "[t]he supreme test of whether a Communist Party-state remains revolutionarily dedicated or degenerates into a revisionist or counterrevolutionary system lies in its attitude toward the Communist ideology." Therefore, the sole ideological purpose of communist states is to spread socialism and to reach that goal these states have to be guided by Marxism–Leninism. The communist states have opted for two ways to achieve this goal, namely govern indirectly by Marxism–Leninism through the party (Soviet model), or commit the state officially through the constitution to Marxism–Leninism (Maoist China–Albania model). The Soviet model is the most common and is currently in use in China.

Marxism–Leninism was mentioned in the Soviet constitution. Article 6 of the 1977 Soviet constitution stated: "The Communist Party, armed with Marxism–Leninism, determines the general perspective of the development of society and the course of the domestic and foreign policy of the USSR." This contrasts with the 1976 Albanian constitution which stated in Article 3: "In the People's Socialist Republic of Albania the dominant ideology is Marxism–Leninism. The entire social order is developing on the basis of its principles." The 1975 Chinese constitution had a similar tone, stating in Article 2 that "Marxism–Leninism–Mao Zedong Thought is the theoretical basis guiding the thinking of our nation." The 1977 Soviet constitution did also use phrases such as "building socialism and communism," "on the road to communism," "to build the material and technical basis of communism" and "to perfect socialist social relations and transform them into communist relations" in the preamble.

=== People's democratic state ===
The people's democratic state was implemented in Eastern Europe after World War II. It can be defined as a state and society in which feudal vestiges have been liquidated and where the system of private ownership exists, but the state-owned enterprises in the field of industry, transport, and credit eclipse it.

In the words of Eugene Varga, "the state itself and its apparatus of violence serve the interests, not of the monopolistic bourgeoisie, but of the toilers of town and country." Soviet philosopher N. P. Farberov stated: "People's democracy in the people's republics is a democracy of the toiling classes, headed by the working class, a broad and full democracy for the overwhelming majority of the people, that is, a socialist democracy in its character and its trend. In this sense, we call it popular."

=== National-democratic state ===
The concept of the national-democratic state tried to theorise how a state could develop socialism by bypassing the capitalist mode of production. While Vladimir Lenin first articulated the theory of non-capitalist development, the novelty of this concept was applying it to the progressive elements of the national liberation movements in the Third World. The term national-democratic state was introduced shortly after the death of Stalin, who believed colonies to be mere lackeys of Western imperialism and that the socialist movement had few prospects there.

The countries where the national liberation movements took power and instituted an anti-imperialist foreign policy and sought to construct a form of socialism were considered national-democratic states by Marxist–Leninists. An example of a national-democratic state is Egypt under Gamal Abdel Nasser which was committed to constructing Arab socialism. Except Cuba, none of these states developed socialism. According to scholar Sylvia Woodby Edington, this might explain why the concept of the national-democratic state "never received full theoretical elaboration as a political system." However, one feature was clearly defined, namely, that these states did not need to be led by a Marxist–Leninist party.

=== Socialist-oriented state ===
A socialist-oriented state seeks to reach socialism by non-capitalist development. As a term, it substantially differs from the concept of the national-democratic state. The singular difference is that the socialist-oriented state was divided into two stages: a national-democratic socialist-oriented state and a people's democratic socialist-oriented state. Countries belonging to the national-democratic socialist-oriented state category were also categorised as national-democratic states. Examples of national-democratic socialist-oriented states are Algeria, ruled by the National Liberation Front, Ba'athist Iraq, and Socialist Burma. In contrast, people's democratic socialist-oriented states had to be guided by Marxism–Leninism and accept the universal truths of Marxism–Leninism and reject other notions of socialism such as African socialism.

The socialist-oriented states had seven defining features, namely, they were revolutionary democracies, had a revolutionary-democratic party, class dictatorship, defence of the socialist-oriented states, had organs of socialisation, initiated socialist construction, and the type of socialist-oriented state (either national-democratic or people's democratic). The political goal of revolutionary democracy is to create the conditions for socialism in countries where the social, political, and economic conditions for socialism do not exist. The second feature to be met is the establishment of a revolutionary-democratic party which has to establish itself as the leading force and guide the state by using Marxist–Leninist ideology. While introduced in these states, democratic centralism is rarely upheld.

Unlike capitalism which is ruled by the bourgeoisie class, and socialism, where the proletariat leads, the socialist-oriented state represents a broad and heterogeneous group of classes that seek to consolidate national independence. Since peasants were usually the largest class in socialist-oriented states, their role was emphasised—similar to the working class in other socialist states. However, Marxist–Leninists admitted that these states often fell under the control of certain cliques such as the military in Ethiopia. The establishment of a legal system and coercive institutions are also noted to safeguard the socialist-oriented nature of the state. The fifth feature is that the socialist-oriented state must take over the media and educational system while establishing mass organisations to mobilise the populace. Unlike the Soviet economic model, the economy of the socialist-oriented states are mixed economies that seek to attract foreign capital and which seeks to maintain and develop the private sector. In the words of Soviet leader Leonid Brezhnev, these states were in the process of taking over the commanding heights of the economy and instituting a state-planned economy. According to Soviet sources, Laos was the one socialist-oriented state that has managed to develop into a socialist state.

=== Socialist state ===
A socialist state is more than a form of government and can only exist in countries with a socialist economy. There are examples of several states that have instituted a socialist form of government before achieving socialism. The former socialist states of Eastern Europe were established as people's democracies (a developmental stage between capitalism and socialism). Regarding the Marxist–Leninist-ruled countries of Africa and the Middle East, the Soviet Union deemed none of them socialist states—referring to them as socialist-oriented states. While many countries with constitutional references to socialism and countries ruled by long-standing socialist movements exist, within Marxist–Leninist theory a socialist state is led by a communist party that has instituted a socialist economy in a given country. It deals with states that define themselves either as a socialist state or as a state led by a governing Marxist–Leninist party in their constitutions. For this reason alone, these states are often called communist states.

== Unified state power ==
=== Supreme state organ of power ===
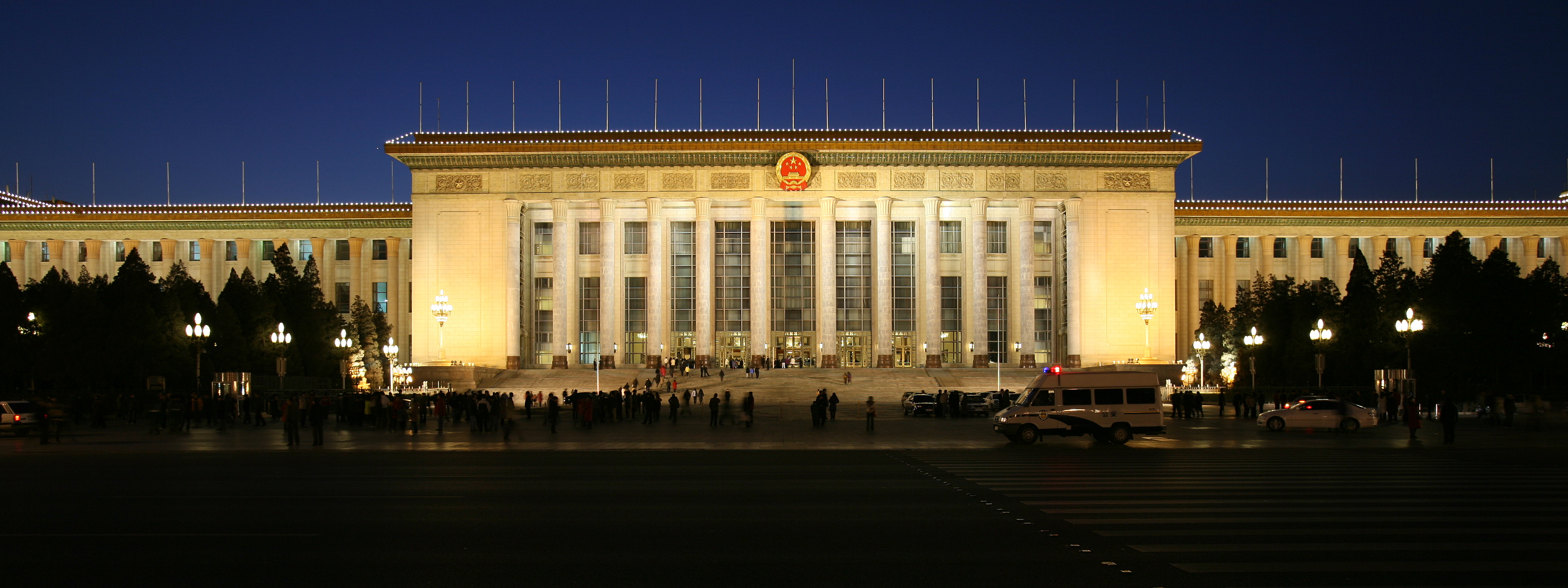
The meeting place of the Chinese National People's Congress

All communist political systems practice unified state power. This means that the supreme state organ of power (abbreviated SSOP in the following) can interfere in the work of the supreme executive and administrative organ, supreme judicial organ, the supreme procuratorial organ, as it deems necessary. This is because both Marx and Lenin abhorred the parliamentary systems of bourgeois democracy, but neither sought to abolish the SSOP as an institution. Lenin wrote that it would be impossible to develop proletarian democracy "without representative institutions." Both of them considered the governing model of the Paris Commune of 1871, in which executive and legislative were combined in one body, to be ideal. More importantly, Marx applauded the election process by "universal suffrage in the various wards and towns." While the SSOP might not be important in itself, they "have a place in the literature and rhetoric of the ruling parties which cannot be ignored—in the language of the party's intimacy with working masses, of its alleged knowledge about interests of working people, of social justice and socialist democracy, of the mass line and learning from the people." This reasoning gives communist SSOPs the right to interfere in every state institution unless the SSOP itself has made a law that bars it from it. This also means there are no limits to politicisation, unlike in liberal democracies, where politicians are legally barred from interfering in judicial work. This is a firm rejection of the separation of powers found in liberal democracies since no institution can legally enforce checks and balances on the SSOP. The SSOP passes the constitution, which can only be amended by the SSOP. Soviet legal theorists denounced judicial review and extra-parliamentary review as bourgeoisie institutions. They also perceived it as a limitation of the people's supreme power. The SSOP, together with its suborgans, oversaw the constitutional order. Since the SSOP is the supreme judge of constitutionality, the SSOP's acts cannot be unconstitutional. Moreover, this means that judicial independence in communist states does not mean the same as in liberal democracies. In communist states, judicial independence means stopping all interference not granted by law, but interference in itself is not barred.

The Supreme Soviet was the first SSOP, and the Soviet legislative system was introduced in all communist states. The Supreme Soviet convened twice a year, usually for two or three days each, making it one of the world's first frequently-convened SSOP during its existence. The same meeting frequency was the norm in the Eastern Bloc countries and modern-day China. China's SSOP, the National People's Congress (NPC), is modelled on the Soviet one. As with the Soviet one, the NPC is the supreme organ of the state and elects a permanent organ of the supreme state organ of power known as the Standing Committee (the Soviets had a Presidium), the supreme executive and administrative organ (named the State Council in China and the Council of Ministers in the Soviet Union), the supreme judicial organ (such as the Supreme Court of East Germany), the supreme procuratorial organ (such as the Supreme People's Procuracy of Vietnam), the chair of the National Defence Council (for example, the Chairman of the Council for National Defense and Security of Vietnam), supreme supervisory organ (such as the Director of China's National Supervisory Commission) and other institutions if they exist. Moreover, in all communist states, the ruling party has either had a clear majority, such as China or held every seat as they did in the Soviet Union, in their Supreme Soviet. A majority in the SSOP ensures the centralised and unified leadership of the central committee of the ruling Marxist–Leninist party over the state.

By having SSOPs, the Marxist–Leninist parties try to keep ideological consistency between supporting representative institutions and safeguarding the party's leading role. They seek to use the SSOPs as a linkage between the rulers and the ruled. These institutions are representative and usually mirror the population in areas such as ethnicity and language, "yet with occupations distributed in a manner skewed towards government officials." Unlike in liberal democracies, SSOPs of communist states are not to act as a forum for conveying demands or interest articulation—they meet too infrequently for this to be the case. This might explain why communist states have not developed terms such as delegates and trustees to give SSOP representatives the power to vote according to their best judgement or in the interest of their constituency. Scholar Daniel Nelson has noted: "As with the British parliament before the seventeenth-century turmoil secured its supremacy, legislative organs in communist states physically portray the 'realm' ruled by (to stretch an analogy) 'kings'. Members of the assemblies 'represent' the population to whom the rulers speak and over whom they govern, convening a broader 'segment of society' [...] than the court itself." Despite this, it does not mean that the communist states use SSOPs to strengthen their communication with the populace—the party, rather than the SSOP, could take that function.

Ideologically, it has another function, namely, to prove that communist states do not only represent the interests of the working class but all social strata. Communist states are committed to establishing a classless society and use SSOPs to show that all social strata, whether bureaucrat, worker, or intellectual, are committed and have interests in building such a society. As is the case in China, national institutions such as the SSOP "must exist which brings together representatives of all nationalities and geographic areas." It does not matter if the SSOPs only rubber stamp decisions because by having them, it shows that communist states are committed to incorporating minorities and areas of the country by including them in the composition of the SSPÅ. In communist states, there is usually a high proportion of members who are government officials. In this instance, it might mean that it is less important what SSOPs do and more important who its representatives are. The members of such SSOPs at central and local levels are usually either government or party officials, leading figures in their community, or national figures outside the communist party. This shows that SSOPs are tools to garner popular support for the government in which leading figures campaign and spread information about the party's policies and ideological development.

Furthermore, Western researchers have devoted little attention to SSOPs in communist states. The reason is that there are no significant organs of political socialisation compared to legislatures in liberal democracies. While political leaders in communist states are often elected as members of SSOPs, these posts are not relevant to political advancement. The role of SSOPs is different from country to country. In the Soviet Union, the Supreme Soviet did "little more than listen to statements from Soviet political leaders and to legitimate decisions already made elsewhere" while in the SSOPs of Poland, Vietnam, and Yugoslavia it has been more active and had an impact on rule-making.

==== Constitution ====
===== Role of constitutions =====
Marxist–Leninists view the constitution as a fundamental law and as an instrument of force. The constitution is the source of law and legality. Unlike in liberal democracies, the Marxist–Leninist constitution is not a framework to limit the power of the state. To the contrary, a Marxist–Leninist constitution seeks to empower the state—believing the state to be an organ of class domination and law to be the expression of the interests of the dominant class. Marxist–Leninists believe that all national constitutions do this to ensure that countries can strengthen and enforce their own class system. In this instance, it means that Marxist–Leninists conceive of constitutions as a tool to defend the socialist nature of the state and attack its enemies. This contrasts with the liberal conception of constitutionalism that "law, rather than men, is supreme."

Unlike the relatively constant (and, in some instances, permanently fixed) nature of democratic constitutions, a Marxist–Leninist constitution is ever-changing. Andrey Vyshinsky, a Procurator General of the Soviet Union during the 1930s, notes that the "Soviet constitutions represent the total of the historical path along which the Soviet state has travelled. At the same time, they are the legislative basis of subsequent development of state life." That is, the constitution sums up what has already been achieved. This belief is also shared by the Chinese Communist Party, which argued that "the Chinese Constitution blazes a path for China, recording what has been won in China and what is yet to be conquered." A constitution in a communist state has an end. The preamble of the 1954 Chinese constitution outlines the historical tasks of the Chinese communists, "step by step, to bring about the socialist industrialisation of the country and, step by step, to accomplish the socialist transformation of agriculture, handicraft and capitalist industry and commerce."

In communist states, the constitution was a tool to analyse the development of society. The Marxist–Leninist party in question would have to study the correlation of forces, literally society's class structure, before enacting changes. Several terms were coined for different developmental states by Marxist–Leninist legal theorists, including new democracy, people's democracy, and the primary stage of socialism. This is also why amendments to constitutions are not enough and major societal changes need a novel constitution which corresponds with the reality of the new class structure.

With Nikita Khrushchev's repudiation of Stalin's practices in the "Secret Speech" and the Chinese Communist Party's repudiation of certain Maoist policies, Marxist–Leninist legal theories began to emphasize "the formal, formerly neglected constitutional order." Deng Xiaoping, not long after Chairman Mao Zedong's death, noted that "[d]emocracy has to be institutionalised and written into law, to make sure that institutions and laws do not change whenever the leadership changes or whenever the leaders change their views. [...] The trouble now is that our legal system is incomplete. [...] Very often what leaders say is taken as law and anyone who disagrees is called a lawbreaker." In 1986, Li Buyan wrote that "the policies of the Party usually are regulations and calls which to a certain extent are only principles. The law is different; it is rigorously standardised. It explicitly and concretely stipulates what the people should, can, or cannot do." These legal developments were echoed in later years in Cuba, Laos, and Vietnam. This has led to the development of the communist concept of socialist rule of law, which runs parallel to, and is distinct from, the liberal term of the same name. In the last years, this emphasis on the constitution as both a legal document and a paper which documents society's development has been noted by the Chinese Communist Party general secretary Xi Jinping, who stated in 2013 that "[n]o organisation or individual has the privilege to overstep the Constitution and law."

===== Constitutional supervision =====
After Soviet Union general secretary Joseph Stalin's death, several communist states have experimented with some sort of constitutional supervision. These organs were designed to safeguard the supreme power of the supreme state organ of power (SSOP) from circumvention by political leaders. Romania was the first to experiment with constitutional supervision when it established a Constitutional Committee in 1965. It was elected by the SSOP, and leading jurists sat on the committee, but it was only empowered to advise the SSOP. Keith Hand has commented that "[i]t was not an effective institution in practice", being unable to prevent Nicolae Ceausescu's emasculation of Romania's Great National Assembly after the inauguration of the July Theses.

Hungary and Poland experimented with constitutional supervision in the early 1980s. Hungary established the Council of Constitutional Law, which was elected by the SSOP and consisted of several leading jurists. It was empowered to review the constitutionality and legality of statutes, administrative regulations, and other normative documents; however, if the agency in question failed to heed its advice, it needed to petition the SSOP. In 1989, the Soviets established the Constitutional Supervision Committee, which "was subordinate only to the USSR constitution." It was empowered "to review the constitutionality and legality of a range of state acts of the USSR and its republics. Its jurisdiction included laws [passed by the SSOP], decrees of the Supreme Soviet's Presidium, union republic constitutions and laws, some central administrative decrees, Supreme Court explanations, and other central normative documents." If the committee deemed the SSOP to have breached legality, the SSOP was obliged to discuss the issue, but it could reject it if more than two-thirds voted against the findings of the Constitutional Supervision Committee. While it was constitutionally powerful, it lacked enforcement powers, it was often ignored, and it failed to defend the constitution during the coup against Mikhail Gorbachev.

The Chinese leadership has argued against establishing any corresponding constitutional supervisory committee due to their association with the failed communist states of Europe. None of the surviving communist states (China, Cuba, Laos, North Korea and Vietnam) have experimented with constitutional supervision committees or constitutional supervision of any kind outside the existing framework until 2018, when the Constitution and Law Committee of the National People's Congress was bestowed the right of constitutional review.

=== Government as the highest administrative agency of state power ===
The government of communist states is usually defined as the "executive organ of the highest state organ of power" or as the "highest administrative agency of state power". It functions as the executive organ of the SSOP. This model has been introduced with variations in all communist states. For most of its existence, the Soviet government was known as the Council of Ministers and identical names were used for the governments of Albania, East Germany, Hungary, Poland, and Romania. It was independent of the other central agencies such as the supreme state organ of power and its permanent organ, but the Supreme Soviet was empowered to decide on all questions it wished. The Soviet government was responsible to the supreme state organ of power, and in between sessions of the supreme state organ of power, it reported to the SSOP's permanent organ. The permanent organ could reorganise and hold the Soviet government accountable, but it could not instruct the government.

In communist states, the government was responsible for the overall economic system, public order, foreign relations, and defence. The Soviet model was more or less identically implemented in Bulgaria, Czechoslovakia, East Germany, Hungary, Poland, and Romania, with few exceptions. One exception was Czechoslovakia, where it had a president and not a collective head of state. Another exception was in Bulgaria, where the State Council was empowered to instruct the Council of Ministers.

=== Judicial organs and socialist law ===
In every communist state, the supreme judicial organ and the supreme procuratorial organs are either internal organs of the supreme state organ of power (SSOP) or, most commonly, make up parts of the unified state apparatus and are directly accountable to the SSOP. For instance, China's Supreme People's Court is the "legislative organ of governance that manages the judicial system in the name of the" National People's Congress, and through it, the Chinese Communist Party. These organs are responsible to and report on their work to the SSOP. For instance, the Prosecutor-General of Vietnam's Supreme People's Procuracy delivers an annual Work Report to the SSOP, the National Assembly, every year. Moreover, all communist states have been established in countries with a civil law system. The countries of Eastern Europe had formally been governed by the Austro-Hungarian Empire, German Empire, and Russian Empire—all of whom had a civil law legal system. Cuba had a civil law system imposed on them by Spain, while China introduced civil law to overlay with Confucian elements, and Vietnam used French law. Since the establishment of the Soviet Union, there has been a scholarly debate on whether socialist law is a separate legal system or is a part of the civil law tradition. Legal scholar Renè David wrote that the socialist legal system "possesses, in relation to our French law, particular features that give it a complete originality, to the extent that it is no longer possible to connect it, like the former Russian law, to the system of Roman law." Similarly, Christopher Osakwe concludes that socialist law is "an autonomous legal system to be essentially distinguished from the other contemporary families of law." Proponents of socialist law as a separate legal system have identified the following features:

1. The socialist law is to disappear with the withering away of the state.
2. The rule of the Marxist–Leninist party.
3. The socialist law is subordinate and reflects changes to the economic order (the absorption of private law by public law).
4. The socialist law has a religious character.
5. The socialist law is prerogative rather than normative.

Legal officials argue differently for their cases compared to Westerners. For instance, "[t]he predominant view among Soviet jurists in the 1920s was that Soviet law of that period was Western-style law appropriate for a Soviet economy that remained capitalist to a significant degree." This changed with the introduction of the command economy, and the term socialist law was conceived to reflect this in the 1930s. Hungarian legal theorist Imre Szabó acknowledged similarities between socialist law and civil law, but he noted that "four basic types of law may be distinguished: the laws of the slave, feudal, capitalist, and socialist societies." Using the Marxist theory of historical materialism, Szabó argues that socialist law cannot belong to the same law family since the material structure is different from the capitalist countries as their superstructure (state) has to reflect these differences. In other words, law is a tool by the ruling class to govern. As Renè David notes, socialist jurists "isolate their law, to put into another category, a reprobate category, the Romanist laws and the common law, is the fact that they reason less as jurists and more as philosophers and Marxists; it is in taking a not strictly legal viewpoint that they affirm the originality of their socialist law." However, some socialist legal theorists, such as Romanian jurist Victor Zlatescu differentiated between type of law and family of law. According to Zlatescu, "[t]he distinction between the law of the socialist countries and the law of the capitalist countries is not of the same nature as the difference between Roman-German law and the common law, for example. Socialist law is not a third family among the others, as in certain writings of Western comparatists." In other words, socialist law is civil law, but it is a different type of law for a different society.

Yugoslav jurist Borislav Blagojević noted that a "great number of legal institutions and legal relations remain the same in socialist law", further stating that it is "necessary and justified" to put them to use if they are "in conformity with the corresponding interests of the ruling class in the state in question." Importantly, socialist law had retained civil law institutions, methodology, and organisation. This can be discerned by the fact that East Germany retained the 1896 German civil code until 1976 while Poland used existing Austrian, French, German, and Russian civil codes until adoption of its own civil code in 1964. Scholar John Quigley wrote that "[s]ocialist law retains the inquisitorial style of trial, law-creation predominantly by SSOPs rather than courts, and a significant role for legal scholarship in construing codes."

=== Military ===
==== Control ====
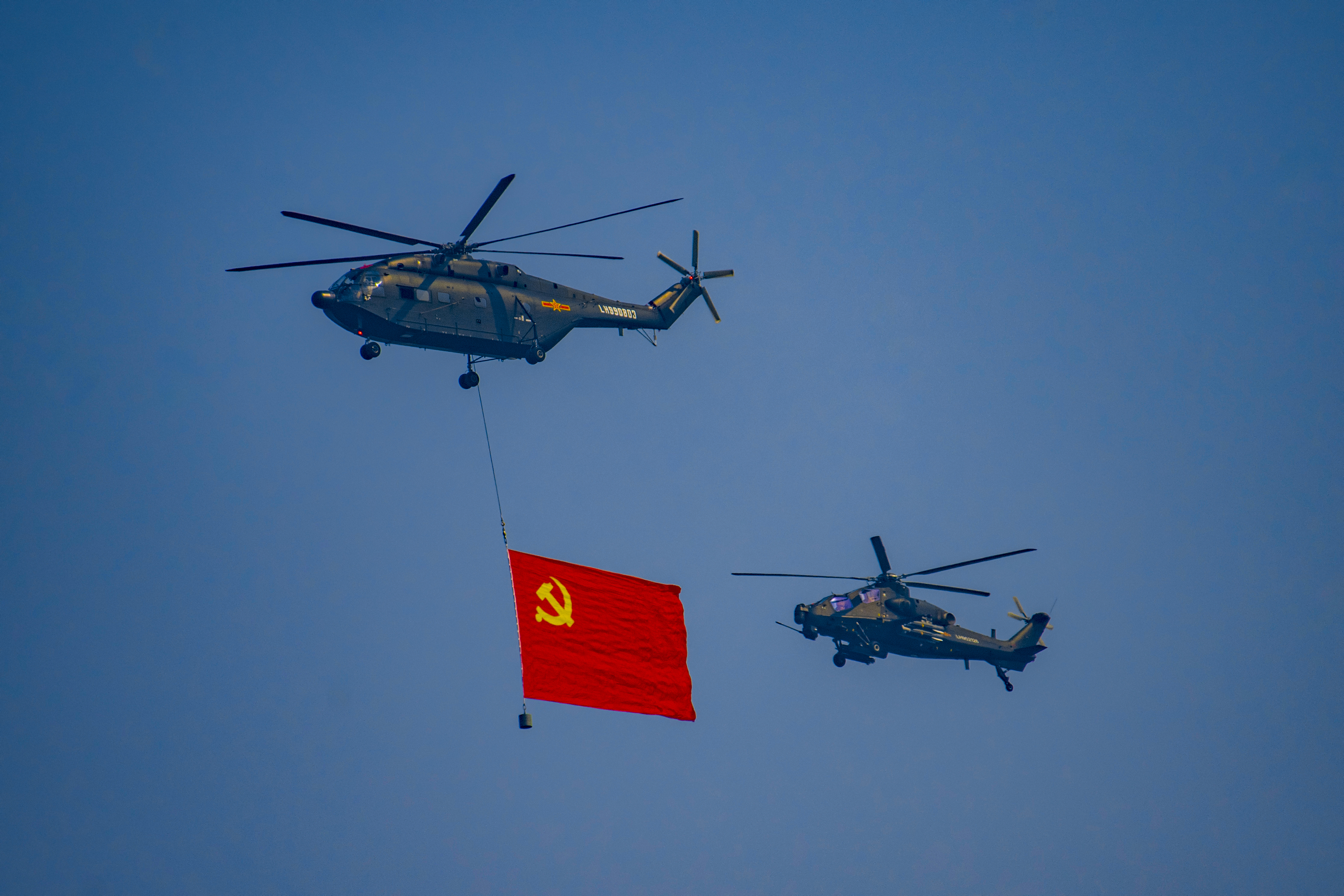
The People's Liberation Army raising the flag of the Chinese Communist Party during a military parade marking the 70th anniversary of the People's Republic of China on 1 October 2019

Communist states have established two types of civil-military systems. The armed forces of most socialist states have historically been state institutions based on the Soviet model, but in China, Laos, North Korea, and Vietnam, the armed forces are party-state institutions. However, several differences exist between the statist (Soviet) and the party-state models (China). In the Soviet model, the Soviet armed forces was led by the Council of Defense (an organ formed by the Presidium of the Supreme Soviet of the Soviet Union) while the Council of Ministers was responsible for formulating defence policies. The party leader was ex officio the Chairman of the Council of Defense. Below the Council of Defense, there was the Main Military Council which was responsible for the strategic direction and leadership of the Soviet armed forces. The working organ of the Council of Defense was the General Staff tasked with analysing military and political situations as they developed. The party controlled the armed forces through the Main Political Directorate (MPD) of the Ministry of Defense, a state organ that functioned "with the authority of a department of the CPSU Central Committee." The MPD organised political indoctrination and created political control mechanisms at the centre to the company level in the field. Formally, the MPD was responsible for organising party and Komsomol organs as well as subordinate organs within the armed forces; ensuring that the party and state retain control over the armed forces; evaluates the political performance of officers; supervising the ideological content of the military press; and supervising the political-military training institutes and their ideological content. The head of the MPD was ranked fourth in military protocol, but it was not a member of the Council of Defense. The Administrative Organs Department of the CPSU Central Committee was responsible for implementing the party personnel policies and supervised the KGB, the Ministry of Internal Affairs and the Ministry of Defense.

In the Chinese party-state model, the People's Liberation Army (PLA) is a party institution. In the preamble of the Constitution of the Chinese Communist Party, it is stated: "The Communist Party of China (CPC) shall uphold its absolute leadership over the People's Liberation Army and other people's armed forces." The PLA carries out its work in accordance with the instructions of the Central Committee of the Chinese Communist Party. Mao Zedong described the PLA's institutional situation as follows: "Every communist must grasp the truth, 'Political power grows out of the barrel of a gun.' Our principle is that the party commands the gun, and the gun must never be allowed to command the Party." The Central Military Commission (CMC) is both an organ of the state and the party—it is an organ of the CCP Central Committee and an organ of the national SSOP, the National People's Congress. The CCP General Secretary is ex officio party CMC Chairman and the President of China is by right state CMC Chairman. The composition of the party CMC and the state CMC are identical. The CMC is responsible for the command of the PLA and determines national defence policies. fifteen departments report directly to the CMC and that are responsible for everything from political work to administration of the PLA. Of significance is that the CMC eclipses by far the prerogatives of the CPSU Administrative Organs Department while the Chinese counterpart to the Main Political Directorate supervises not only the military, but also intelligence, the security services, and counterespionage work.

==== Representation ====
Unlike in liberal democracies, active military personnel are members and partake in civilian institutions of governance. This is the case in all communist states. The Communist Party of Vietnam (CPV) has elected at least one active military figure to its CPV Politburo since 1986. In the 1986–2006 period, active military figures sitting in the CPV Central Committee stood at an average of 9,2 per cent. Military figures are also represented in the SSOP (the National Assembly) and other representative institutions. In China, the two CMC vice chairmen have had by right office seats in the CCP Politburo since 1987.

=== Ruling party ===
==== Leading role ====
A Marxist–Leninist party has led every communist state. This party seeks to represent and articulate the interests of the classes exploited by capitalism. It seeks to lead the exploited classes to achieve communism. However, the party cannot be identified with the exploited class in general. Its membership comprises members with advanced consciousness above sectional interests. Therefore, the party represents the advanced section of the exploited classes and, through them, leads the exploited classes by interpreting the universal laws governing human history towards communism.

In Foundations of Leninism (1924), Joseph Stalin wrote that "the proletariat [working class] needs the Party first of all as its General Staff, which it must have for the successful seizure of power. [...] But the proletariat needs the Party not only to achieve the [class] dictatorship; it needs it still more to maintain the [class] dictatorship." The current Constitution of Vietnam states in Article 4 that "[t]he Communist Party of Vietnam, the vanguard of the Vietnamese working class, simultaneously the vanguard of the toiling people and of the Vietnamese nation, the faithful representative of the interests of the working class, the toiling people, and the whole nation, acting upon the Marxist–Leninist doctrine and Ho Chi Minh's thought, is the leading force of the state and society." In a similar form, the Chinese Communist Party (CCP) describes itself as "the vanguard of the Chinese working class, the Chinese people, and the Chinese nation." As noted by both communist parties, the ruling parties of communist states are vanguard parties. Vladimir Lenin theorised that vanguard parties were "capable of assuming power and leading the whole people to socialism, of directing and organising the new system, of being the teacher, the guide, the leader of all the working and exploited people in organising their social life without the bourgeoisie." This idea eventually evolved into the concept of the party's leading role in leading the state as seen in the CCP's self-description and Vietnam's constitution.

==== Internal organisation ====
The Marxist–Leninist governing party organises itself around the principle of democratic centralism and through it, the state too. It means that all directing organs of the party, from top to bottom, shall be elected; that party organs shall give periodical accounts of their activities to their respective party organisations; that there shall be strict party discipline and the subordination of the minority to the majority; and that all decisions of higher organs shall be absolutely binding on lower organs and on all party members.

The supreme organ of a Marxist–Leninist governing party is the party congress. The congress elects the central committee and either an auditing commission and a control commission, or both, although not always. The central committee is the party's highest decision-making organ in-between party congresses and elects a politburo and a secretariat amongst its members and the party's leader. When the central committee is not in session, the politburo is the highest decision-making organ of the party and the secretariat is the highest administrative organ. In certain parties, either the central committee or the politburo elects amongst its members a standing committee of the politburo which acts as the highest decision-making organ in between sessions of the politburo, central committee, and the Congress. This leadership structure is identical all the way down to the primary party organisation of the ruling party.

== Economic system ==
From reading their works, many followers of Karl Marx and Friedrich Engels drew the idea that the socialist economy would be based on planning and not market mechanisms. These ideas later developed into believing that planning was superior to the market mechanism. Upon seizing power, the Bolsheviks began advocating a national state planning system. The 8th Congress of the Russian Communist Party (Bolsheviks) resolved to institute "the maximum centralisation of production [...] simultaneously striving to establish a unified economic plan." The Gosplan, the State Planning Commission, the Supreme Soviet of the National Economy, and other central planning organs were established during the 1920s in the era of the New Economic Policy. On introducing the planning system, it became a common belief in the international communist movement that the Soviet planning system was a more advanced form of economic organisation than capitalism. This led to the system being introduced voluntarily in countries such as China, Cuba, and Vietnam and, in some cases, imposed by the Soviet Union.

In communist states, the state planning system had five main characteristics. Firstly, except for field consumption and employment, practically all decisions were centralised at the top. Secondly, the system was hierarchical—the centre formulated a plan that was sent down to the level below, which would imitate the process and send the plan further down the pyramid. Thirdly, the plans were binding in nature, i.e. everyone had to follow and meet the goals outlined in them. Fourthly, the predominance of calculating in physical terms to ensure planned allocation of commodities were not incompatible with planned production. Finally, money played a passive role within the state sector since the planners focused on physical allocation.

According to Michael Ellman, in a centrally-planned economy, "the state owns the land and all other natural resources and all characteristics of the traditional model, the enterprises, and their productive assets. Collective ownership (e.g. the property of collective farms) also exists but plays a subsidiary role and is expected to be temporary." The private ownership of the means of production still exists, although it plays a somewhat more minor role. Since the class struggle in capitalism is caused by the division between owners of the means of production and the workers who sell their labour, state ownership (defined as the property of the people in these systems) is considered as a tool to end the class struggle and empower the working class.

== Analysis ==
Countries such as the Soviet Union and China were criticised by various authors and organisations based on the lack of the representative nature of multi-party liberal democracy, in addition to several other areas where socialist society and Western societies differed. Socialist societies were commonly characterised by state ownership or social ownership of the means of production either through administration through communist party organisations, democratically elected councils and communes, and co-operative structures—in opposition to the liberal democratic capitalist free-market paradigm of management, ownership and control by corporations and private individuals. Communist states have also been criticised for the influence and outreach of their respective ruling parties on society, in addition to lack of recognition for some Western legal rights and liberties such as the right to own property and the restriction of the right to free speech. The early economic development policies of communist states have been criticised for focusing primarily on the development of heavy industry.

Communist party rule has been criticised as authoritarian or totalitarian for suppressing and killing political dissidents and social classes (so-called "enemies of the people"), religious persecution, ethnic cleansing, forced collectivisation, and use of forced labour in concentration camps. Communist party rule has also been accused of genocidal acts in Cambodia, China, Poland and Ukraine, although there is scholarly dispute regarding the Holodomor's classification as genocide. Especially in the West, criticism of communist rule has also been grounded in criticism of socialism, by economists such as Friedrich Hayek and Milton Friedman, who argued that the state ownership and planned economy characteristic of Soviet-style communist rule were responsible for economic stagnation and shortage economies, providing few incentives for individuals to improve productivity and engage in entrepreneurship. Anti-Stalinist left and other left-wing critics see it as an example of state capitalism and have referred to it as a red fascism contrary to left-wing politics. Other leftists, including Marxist–Leninists, criticise it for its repressive state actions while recognising certain advancements such as egalitarian achievements and modernisation under such states. Counter-criticism is diverse, including the view it presents a biased or exaggerated anti-communist narrative. Some academics propose a more nuanced analysis of communist party rule.

Soviet advocates and socialists responded to criticism by highlighting the ideological differences in the concept of freedom. McFarland and Ageyev noted that "Marxist–Leninist norms disparaged laissez-faire individualism (as when housing is determined by one's ability to pay), also [condemning] wide variations in personal wealth as the West has not. Instead, Soviet ideals emphasised equality—free education and medical care, little disparity in housing or salaries, and so forth." When asked to comment on the claim that former citizens of communist states enjoy increased freedoms, Heinz Kessler, former East German Minister of National Defence, replied: "Millions of people in Eastern Europe are now free from employment, free from safe streets, free from health care, free from social security."

In his analysis of states run under Marxist–Leninist ideology, economist Michael Ellman of the University of Amsterdam notes that such states compared favourably with Western states in some health indicators such as infant mortality and life expectancy. A 1986 study published in the American Journal of Public Health and a 1992 study published in International Journal of Health Services stated, respectively, that "between countries at similar levels of economic development, socialist countries showed more favorable PQL (physical quality of life) outcomes" and that socialism was "for the most part, more successful than capitalism in improving the health conditions of the world's populations." Philipp Ther posits that there was an increase in the standard of living throughout Eastern Bloc countries as the result of modernisation programs under communist governments. Similarly, Amartya Sen's own analysis of international comparisons of life expectancy found that several Marxist–Leninist states made significant gains and commented "one thought that is bound to occur is that communism is good for poverty removal." According to researchers Dylan Sullivan, Michael Moatsos and Jason Hickel in 2022:

Socialist states tend to invest in public provisioning systems to provide people with access to essential goods. In such cases, the cost of meeting basic needs is generally quite low. In capitalist states, with high levels of commodification or privatisation, the same goods may be significantly more expensive. Therefore, a dollar of income (in broad-gauge PPPs) is likely to have a stronger welfare purchasing power in socialist states than in capitalist states.

Socialist scholar Michael Parenti argues that communist states experienced greater economic development than they would have otherwise, or that their leaders were forced to take harsh measures to defend their countries against the Western Bloc during the Cold War. In addition, Parenti states that communist party rule provided some human rights such as economic, social and cultural rights not found under capitalist states such as that everyone is treated equal regardless of education or financial stability; that any citizen can keep a job; or that there is a more efficient and equal distribution of resources.

Professors Paul Greedy and Olivia Ball report that communist parties pressed Western governments to include economic rights in the Universal Declaration of Human Rights. Professor David L. Hoffmann argues that many actions of communist party rule were rooted in the response Western governments gave during World War I and that communist party rule institutionalised them. While noting "its brutalities and failures", Milne argues that "rapid industrialisation, mass education, job security and huge advances in social and gender equality" are not accounted and the dominant account of communist party rule "gives no sense of how communist regimes renewed themselves after 1956 or why western leaders feared they might overtake the capitalist world well into the 1960s."

However, a study by the Royal Society Open Science concluded that "Communism significantly negatively predicts HDI, income and health indices" and that "Post World War II economic growth in communist countries was modest, especially during the 1970s and 1980s, relative to non-communist European countries." During the latter half of the Communist era, Eastern Bloc states saw a protracted stagnation or decline in life expectancy and other health metrics, corresponding to a period of economic stagnation. Furthermore, a study by the Polish Sociological Review concluded that most Eastern European countries were reducing their disparity with the West already before the First World War, and the most competent reformers started catching up with the West again after the Fall of Communism. This stands in contrast to the Communist era, when most of the Eastern Bloc fell behind the West economically.

=== Left-wing criticism ===
Left-wing critics argue that states under communist party rule took the form of state capitalism and that they followed imperialism, populism, nationalism and social democracy. Rather than representing a socialist planned economy, the Soviet model has been described in practice as either a form of state capitalism or a non-planned, command economy. The fidelity of those varied socialist revolutionaries, leaders and parties to the work of Karl Marx and that of other socialist thinkers is highly contested and has been rejected by many Marxists and other socialists alike. Some academics, scholars and socialists have criticised the linking of all leftist and socialist ideals to the excesses of authoritarian socialism.

Many democratic and libertarian socialists, including anarchists, mutualists and syndicalists, refer to communist states as examples of state socialism, and they oppose this system for its support of a workers' state instead of abolishing the bourgeois state apparatus outright. They contrast state socialism with their own form of socialism which involves either collective ownership (in the form of worker cooperatives) or common ownership of the means of production without central planning by the state. Those libertarian socialists believe there is no need for a state in a socialist system because there would be no class to suppress and no need for an institution based on coercion, and they regard the state being a remnant of capitalism. They hold that statism is antithetical to true socialism. For instance, libertarian socialist William Morris wrote in a Commonweal article: "State Socialism? — I don't agree with it; in fact I think the two words contradict one another, and that it is the business of Socialism to destroy the State and put Free Society in its place".

American Marxist Raya Dunayevskaya dismissed communist states as a type of state capitalism because she believed that state ownership of the means of production represents state capitalism rather than socialism and that single-party rule is undemocratic contrary to the dictatorship of the proletariat. She also argued that Marxism–Leninism is neither Marxism nor Leninism, but rather a composite ideology which socialist leaders such as Joseph Stalin used to expediently determine what is communism and what is not communism among the Eastern Bloc countries.

=== Memory ===
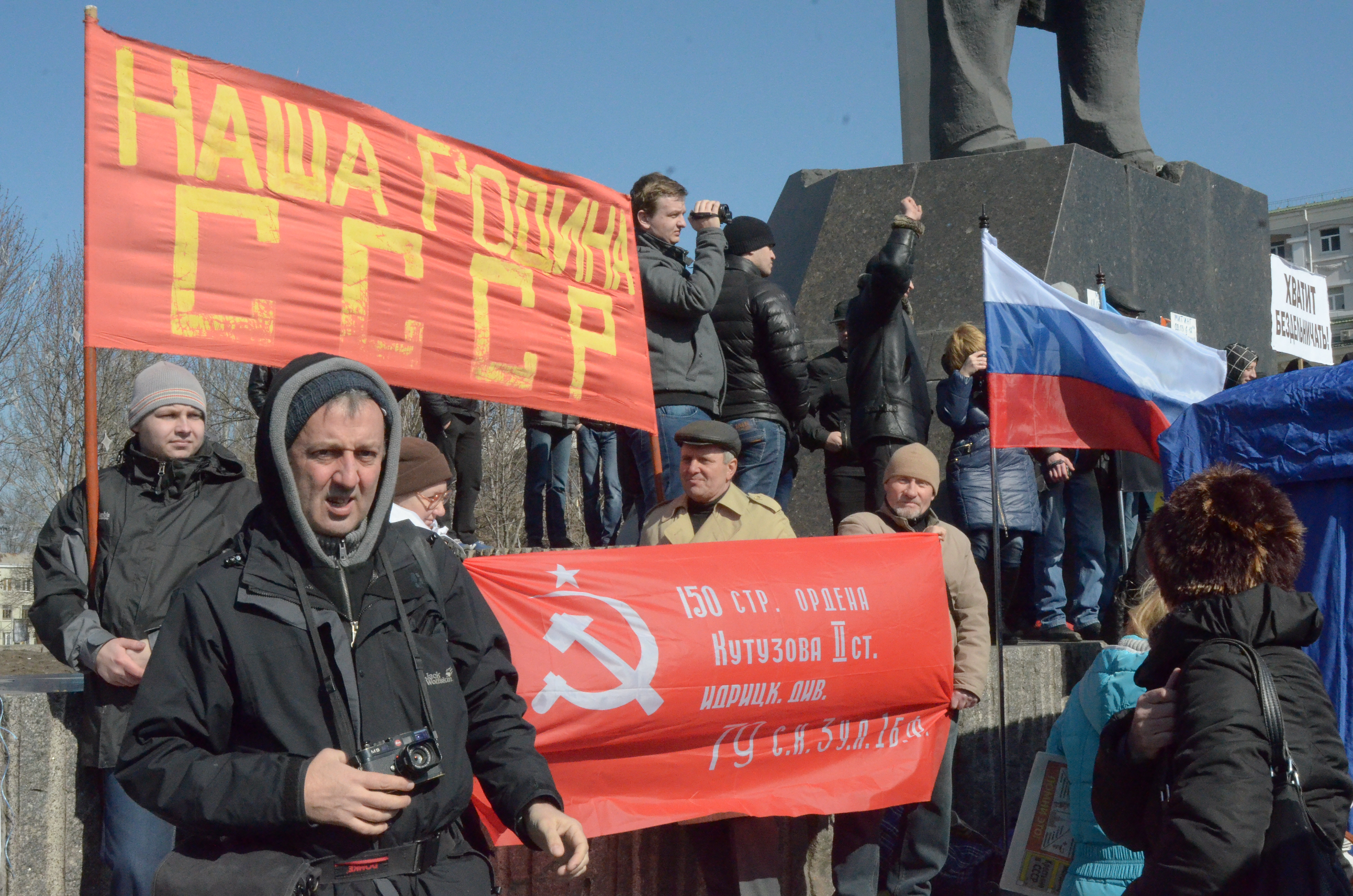
Protest against Ukrainian decommunisation policies in Donetsk, 2014. The red banner reads, "Our homeland USSR".

Monuments to the victims of communist states exist in almost all capitals of Eastern Europe. There are several museums documenting communist rule such as the Museum of Occupations and Freedom Fights in Lithuania, the Museum of the Occupation of Latvia in Riga, and the House of Terror in Budapest, all three of which also document Nazi rule. In Washington D.C., a bronze statue based upon the 1989 Tiananmen Square Goddess of Democracy sculpture was dedicated as the Victims of Communism Memorial in 2007, having been authorised by the United States Congress in 1993. The Victims of Communism Memorial Foundation plans to build an International Museum on Communism in Washington. As of 2008, Russia contained 627 memorials and memorial plaques dedicated to victims of the communist states, most of which were created by private citizens and did not have a national monument or a national museum. The Wall of Grief in Moscow, inaugurated in October 2017, is Russia's first monument for victims of political persecution by Stalin during the country's Soviet era. In 2017, Canada's National Capital Commission approved the design for a memorial to the victims of communism to be built at the Garden of the Provinces and Territories in Ottawa. On 23 August 2018, Estonia's Victims of Communism 1940–1991 Memorial was inaugurated in Tallinn by President Kersti Kaljulaid. The memorial construction was financed by the state and is managed by the Estonian Institute of Historical Memory. The opening ceremony was chosen to coincide with the official European Day of Remembrance for Victims of Stalinism and Nazism.

According to Laure Neumayer, this is used as an anti-communist narrative "based on a series of categories and figures" to "denounce Communist state violence (qualified as 'Communist crimes', 'red genocide' or 'classicide') and to honour persecuted individuals (presented alternatively as 'victims of Communism' and 'heroes of anti totalitarian resistance')." According to anthropologist Kristen Ghodsee, efforts to institutionalise the victims of communism narrative, or the moral equivalence between the Nazi Holocaust (race murder) and the victims of communism (class murder), and in particular the push at the beginning of the 2008 financial crisis for commemoration of the latter in Europe, can be seen as the response by economic and political elites to fears of a leftist resurgence in the face of devastated economies and extreme inequalities in both the East and West as the result of the excesses of neoliberal capitalism. Ghodsee argues that any discussion of achievements under communist states, including literacy, education, women's rights, and social security is usually silenced, and any discourse on the subject of communism is focused almost exclusively on Stalin's crimes and the double genocide theory.

In the decades following the Revolutions of 1989, nostalgia for the defunct Marxist governments and the communist ideal reemerged among segments of the population in the former Soviet Union and much of Eastern Europe. Russian-American author and cultural theorist Svetlana Boym noted that outbreaks of nostalgia often follow periods of political change and revolution. She observed that in former communist states, memory narratives surrounding life under socialism may be polarised. Many residents who lived through this era recalled only economic stagnation, while others valued it for a sense of perceived stability and national strength.

The dissolution of the Soviet Union was followed by a rapid increase in poverty, crime, corruption, unemployment, homelessness, rates of disease, infant mortality, and income inequality. The region also experienced a spike in excess deaths. A 2026 Lancet preprint estimates 15.9 million deaths in former Soviet States through to 2019 occurred due to its dissolution, accounting for demographic shift and hampered development. In Russia much of this was the result of IMF-backed economic reforms of Boris Yeltsin, which pushed austerity on the country against the will of the Russian parliament. These were mostly knock-on effects of the collapse of Communist-era industries that were uncompetitive in a market economy, and the resulting loss of public funds.

According to Kristen Ghodsee, a researcher on post-communist Eastern Europe:

Only by examining how the quotidian aspects of daily life were affected by great social, political and economic changes can we make sense of the desire for this collectively imagined, more egalitarian past. Nobody wants to revive 20th century totalitarianism. But nostalgia for communism has become a common language through which ordinary men and women express disappointment with the shortcomings of parliamentary democracy and neoliberal capitalism today.

Ekaterina Kalinina, a sociologist at the University of Copenhagen, found that positive narratives of life under socialism was often driven by the loss of social benefits and the collapse of the extensive welfare state enjoyed by many residents of former communist states. Kalinina pointed out that nostalgia for the Soviet Union had the greatest appeal to those "who find themselves in more vulnerable economic and social positions" in Russia after 1991. Per Kalinina, these individuals are nostalgic for "economic security and social welfare."

== See also ==
- List of communist states
- List of non-communist socialist states
- Capitalist state
- List of anti-capitalist and communist parties with national parliamentary representation
- List of communist parties
- Marxism–Leninism–Maoism
- Stalinism

== Bibliography ==
=== General ===
References for when the individuals were elected to the office of CCP leader, the name of the offices and when they established and were abolished are found below.

- 19th National Congress (2017). Constitution of the Communist Party of China. Chinese Communist Party.
- Gungwu, Wang (2012). China: Development and Governance. World Scientific Publishing Company. pp. 12–13. ISBN 978-981-4425-84-1.

=== Articles ===
- Bui, T. (2016). "Constitutionalizing Single Party Leadership in Vietnam: Dilemmas of Reform" (PDF). Asian Journal of Comparative Law. 11 (2). Cambridge University Press: 219–234. doi:10.1017/asjcl.2016.22.
- Chang, Yu-nan (August 1956). "The Chinese Communist State System Under the Constitution of 1954". The Journal of Politics. 18 (3). The University of Chicago Press on behalf of the Southern Political Science Association: 520–546. doi:10.2307/2127261. JSTOR 2127261. S2CID 154446161.
- Ghodsee, Kristen (Fall 2014). "A Tale of 'Two Totalitarianisms': The Crisis of Capitalism and the Historical Memory of Communism". History of the Present: A Journal of Critical History. 4 (2): 115–142. doi:10.5406/historypresent.4.2.0115. JSTOR 10.5406/historypresent.4.2.0115.
- Ghodsee, Kristen; Sehon, Scott; Dresser, Sam, eds. (22 March 2018). "The merits of taking an anti-anti-communism stance". Aeon. Archived from the original on 1 April 2022.
- Guins, George (July 1950). "Law Does not Wither Away in the Soviet Union". The Russian Review. 9 (3). Wiley on behalf of The Editors and Board of Trustees of the Russian Review: 187–204. doi:10.2307/125763. JSTOR 125763.
- Hand, Keith (2016). "An Assessment of Socialist Constitutional Supervision Models and Prospects for a Constitutional Supervision Committee in China: The Constitution as Commander?". Legal Studies Research Paper Series (150). University of California. SSRN 2624663.
- Hoepller, Cristopher (2011). "Russian Demographics: The Role of the Collapse of the Soviet Union". Undergraduate Research Journal for the Human Sciences. 10 (1).
- Howard, M. C.; King, J. E. (2001). "'State Capitalism' in the Soviet Union" (PDF). History of Economics Review. 34 (1): 110–126. doi:10.1080/10370196.2001.11733360. Archived from the original (PDF) on 28 July 2019.
- Imam, Zafar (July–September 1986). "The Theory of the Soviet State Today". The Indian Journal of Political Science. 47 (3). Indian Political Science Association: 382–398. JSTOR 41855253.
- Keith, Richard (March 1991). "Chinese Politics and the New Theory of 'Rule of Law'". The China Quarterly. 125 (125). Cambridge University Press on behalf of the School of Oriental and African Studies: 109–118. doi:10.1017/S0305741000030320. JSTOR 654479. S2CID 154980279.
- Kokoshin, Andrey (October 2016). "2015 Military Reform in the People's Republic of China" (PDF). Belfer Center Paper. Belfer Center for Science and International Affairs.
- Kramer, Mark N. (January 1985). "Civil-Military Relations in the Warsaw Pact: The East European Component". International Affairs. 61 (1). Oxford University Press on behalf of the Royal Institute of International Affairs: 45–66. doi:10.2307/2619779. JSTOR 2619779.
- McFarland, Sam; Ageyev, Vladimir; Abalakina-Paap, Marina (1992). "Authoritarianism in the Former Soviet Union". Journal of Personality and Social Psychology. 63 (6): 1004–1010. doi:10.1037/0022-3514.63.6.1004.
- Miller, Alice (January 2018). "The 19th Central Committee Politburo" (PDF). China Leadership Monitor (55). Hoover Institute.
- Mulvenon, James (January 2018). "The Cult of Xi and the Rise of the CMC Chairman Responsibility System" (PDF). China Leadership Monitor (55). Hoover Institute.
- Poelzer, Greg (1989). An Analysis of Grenada as a Socialist-Oriented State (Thesis). Carleton University.
- Skilling, H. Gordon (January 1961). "People's Democracy and the Socialist Revolution: A Case Study in Communist Scholarship. Part I". Soviet Studies. Vol. 12, no. 3. Taylor & Francis. pp. 241–262.
- Snyder, Stanley (1987). Soviet Troop Control and the Power Distribution (Thesis). Naval Postgraduate School. hdl:10945/22490.
- National Foreign Assessment Center (1980). Political Control of the Soviet Armed Forces (PDF) (Report). Central Intelligence Agency. Archived from the original (PDF) on 21 January 2017.
- Steiner, H. Arthur (1951). "The Role of the Chinese Communist Party". The Annals of the American Academy of Political and Social Science. 277 (1): 56–66. doi:10.1177/000271625127700107. ISSN 0002-7162. JSTOR 1030252. S2CID 145485494.
- Stone Sweet, Alec; Bu, Chong; Zhuo, Ding (25 May 2023). "Breaching the Taboo? Constitutional Dimensions of the New Chinese Civil Code". Asian Journal of Comparative Law. 18 (3): 319–344. doi:10.1017/asjcl.2023.18. S2CID 258915998.
- Tang, Peter S. H. (February 1980). "The Soviet, Chinese and Albanian Constitutions: Ideological Divergence and Institutionalized Confrontation?". Studies in Soviet Thought. 21 (1). Springer Publishing: 39–58. doi:10.1007/BF00832025. JSTOR 20098938.pdf. S2CID 144486393.
- Quigley, John (Autumn 1989). "Socialist Law and the Civil Law Tradition" (PDF). The American Journal of Comparative Law. 37 (4). Oxford University Press: 781–808. doi:10.2307/840224. JSTOR 840224. Archived from the original (PDF) on 17 May 2018.

=== Books ===
- Biddle, Jeff; Samuels, Warren; Davis, John (2006). A Companion to the History of Economic Thought. Wiley-Blackwell.
- Blasko, Dennis (2006). The Chinese Army Today: Tradition and Transformation for the 21st Century. Routledge. ISBN 978-1-135-98877-7.
- Dean, Jodi (2012). The Communist Horizon. Verso Books. ISBN 978-1-84467-954-6.
- Dimitrov, Vessellin (2006). "Bulgaria: A Core Against the Odds". In Dimitrov, Vessellin; Goetz, H. Klaus; Wollmann, Hellmut (eds.). Governing after Communism: Institutions and Policymaking (2nd ed.). Martinus Nijhoff Publishers. pp. 159–203. ISBN 978-0-7425-4009-5.
- Durlauf, Steven N.; Blume, Lawrence E., eds. (1987). The New Palgrave Dictionary of Economics Online. Palgrave Macmillan. doi:10.1057/9780230226203.1570.
- Ellman, Michael (2007). "The Rise and Fall of Socialist Planning". In Estrin, Saul; Kołodko, Grzegorz W.; Uvalić, Milica (eds.). Transition and Beyond: Essays in Honour of Mario Nuti. New York City: Palgrave Macmillan. ISBN 978-0-230-54697-4.
- Ellman, Michael (2014). Socialist Planning (3rd ed.). Cambridge University Press. ISBN 978-1-107-42732-7.
- Evans, Daniel (1993). Soviet Marxism–Leninism: The Decline of an Ideology. ABC-CLIO. ISBN 978-0-275-94763-7.
- Feldbrugge, F. J. M. (1985). "Council of Ministers". In Feldbrugge, F. J. M.; Van den Berg, G. P.; Simons, William B. (eds.). Encyclopedia of Soviet Law (2nd ed.). Martinus Nijhoff Publishers. pp. 202–204. ISBN 1-349-06086-0.
- Furtak, Robert K. (1987). The Political Systems of the Socialist States. New York City: St. Martin's Press. ISBN 978-0-312-62527-6.
- Gardner, John; Schöpflin, George; White, Stephen (1987). Communist Political Systems (2nd ed.). Macmillan Education. ISBN 0-333-44108-7.
- Harding, Neil (1981). "What Does It Mean to Call a Regime Marxist?". In Szajkowski, Bogdan (ed.). Marxist Governments. Vol. 1. Palgrave Macmillan. pp. 22–33. ISBN 978-0-333-25704-3.
- Hazard, John (1985). "Constitutional Law". In Feldbrugge, F. J. M.; Van den Berg, G. P.; Simons, William B. (eds.). Encyclopedia of Soviet Law (2nd ed.). Martinus Nijhoff Publishers. pp. 162–163. ISBN 1-349-06086-0.
- Levy, David M.; Peart, Sandra J. (2008). "Socialist calculation debate". The New Palgrave Dictionary of Economics (Second ed.). Palgrave Macmillan. ISBN 978-0-333-78676-5.
- Li, Lin (2017). Building the Rule of Law in China. Elsevier. ISBN 978-0-12-811930-3.
- Lichtenstein, Nelson (2011). American Capitalism: Social Thought and Political Economy in the Twentieth Century. University of Pennsylvania Press. ISBN 978-0-8122-0263-2.
- Loeber, Dietrich Andre (1984). "On the Status of the CPSU within the Soviet Legal System". In Simons, William; White, Stephen (eds.). The Party Statutes of the Communist World. Martinus Nijhoff Publishers. pp. 1–22. ISBN 978-90-247-2975-3.
- Von Mises, Ludwig (1990). Economic calculation in the Socialist Commonwealth (PDF). Mises Institute. Archived (PDF) from the original on 13 September 2019.
- Nation, R. Craig (1992). Black Earth, Red Star: A History of Soviet Security Policy, 1917-1991. Cornell University Press. pp. 85–6. ISBN 978-0-8014-8007-2. Archived from the original on 1 August 2019 – via Google Books.
- Nelson, Daniel (1982). "Communist Legislatures and Communist Politics". In Nelson, Daniel; White, Stephen (eds.). Communist Legislatures in Comparative Perspective. Vol. 1. Palgrave Macmillan. pp. 1–13. ISBN 1-349-06086-0.
- Rosser, Barkley; Rosser, Marianne (2003). Comparative Economics in a Transforming World Economy. MIT Press. ISBN 978-0-262-18234-8.
- Staar, Richard (1988). Communist Regimes in Eastern Europe (4th ed.). Hoover Press. ISBN 978-0-8179-7693-4.
- Steele, David Ramsay (September 1999). From Marx to Mises: Post Capitalist Society and the Challenge of Economic Calculation. Open Court. ISBN 978-0-87548-449-5.
- Thayer, Carlyle (2008). "Military Politics in Contemporary Vietnam" (PDF). In Mietzner, Marcus (ed.). The Political Resurgence of the Military in Southeast Asia: Conflict and Leadership. Routledge. ISBN 978-0-415-46035-4.
- Triska, Jan, ed. (1968). Constitution of the Communist-Party States. Hoover Institution Publications. ISBN 978-0-8179-1701-2.
- Tung, W. L. (2012). The Political Institutions of Modern China (2nd ed.). Springer Science & Business Media. ISBN 978-94-010-3443-2.
- Wilczynski, J. (2008). The Economics of Socialism after World War Two: 1945–1990. Aldine Transaction. ISBN 978-0-202-36228-1.
- Wilhelm, John Howard (1985). "The Soviet Union Has an Administered, Not a Planned, Economy". Soviet Studies. 37 (1): 118–130. doi:10.1080/09668138508411571.
- Williams, Raymond (1983). "Socialism". Keywords: A vocabulary of culture and society, revised edition. Oxford University Press. ISBN 978-0-19-520469-8.

=== News ===
- Christie, Caroline (24 January 2019). "Exploring the rise of Soviet nostalgia in Russia". Document Journal. New York. Archived from the original on 29 March 2024.
- Milne, Seumas (12 September 2002). "The battle for history". The Guardian.
- Milne, Seumas (16 February 2006). "Communism may be dead, but clearly not dead enough". The Guardian.
- Morris, William (17 May 1890). "The 'Eight Hours' and the Demonstration". Commonweal. Vol. 6, no. 227. p. 153 – via Marxists Internet Archive.

=== Other ===
- Ehms, Jule (2014). "The Communist Horizon". Marx & Philosophy Review of Books. Marx & Philosophy Society.
- Wolff, Richard D. (27 June 2015). "Socialism Means Abolishing the Distinction Between Bosses and Employees". Truthout. Archived from the original on 11 March 2018.
