= Two-stage theory =

Marxist–Leninist theoretical concept

The two-stage theory, or stagism, is a Marxist–Leninist political theory which argues that underdeveloped countries such as Tsarist Russia must first pass through a stage of capitalism via a bourgeois revolution before moving to a socialist stage.

Stagism was applied to countries worldwide that had not passed through the capitalist stage. In the Soviet Union, the two-stage theory was opposed by the Trotskyist theory of permanent revolution.

While the discussion on stagism focuses on the Russian Revolution, Maoist theories such as New Democracy tend to apply a two-stage theory to struggles elsewhere.

== Theory ==
In Marxist–Leninist theory under Joseph Stalin, the theory of two stages gained a revival. More recently, the South African Communist Party and the Socialist Alliance have re-elaborated the two-stage theory, although the Socialist Alliance differentiates their position from the Stalinist one.

== Criticism ==
The two-stage theory is often attributed to Karl Marx and Friedrich Engels, but critics such as David McLellan and others dispute that they envisaged the strict application of this theory outside of the actually existing Western development of capitalism.

Although all agree that Marx and Engels argue that Western capitalism provides the technological advances necessary for socialism and the "grave diggers" of the capitalist class in the form of the working class, critics of the two-stage theory, including most trends of Trotskyism, counter that Marx and Engels denied that they had laid down a formula to be applied to all countries in all circumstances. McLellan and others cite Marx's "Reply to Mikhailovsky":

[Mikhailovsky] feels he absolutely must metamorphose my historical sketch of the genesis of capitalism in Western Europe into a historico-philosophic theory of the general path every people is fated to tread, whatever the historical circumstances in which it finds itself [...] but I beg his pardon. (He is both honoring and shaming me too much.)

— Karl Marx, "Reply to Mikhailovsky"

In the preface to the Russian edition of The Communist Manifesto of 1882, Marx and Engels specifically outline an alternative path to socialism for Russia.

In Russia, the Mensheviks believed the two-stage theory applied to Tsarist Russia. They were criticized by Leon Trotsky in what became the theory of permanent revolution in 1905. Later when the two-stage theory re-appeared in the Soviet Union after the death of Vladimir Lenin, the theory of permanent revolution was supported by the Left Opposition. The permanent revolution theory argues that the tasks allotted in the two-stage theory to the capitalist class can only be carried out by the working class with the support of the poor peasantry and that the working class will then pass on to the socialist tasks and expropriate the capitalist class. However, the revolution cannot pause here and must remain permanent in the sense that it must seek worldwide revolution to avoid isolation and move towards international socialism.

== See also ==
- Historical materialism
- Impossibilism
