= Ilya Trainin =

Soviet jurist (1886–1949)

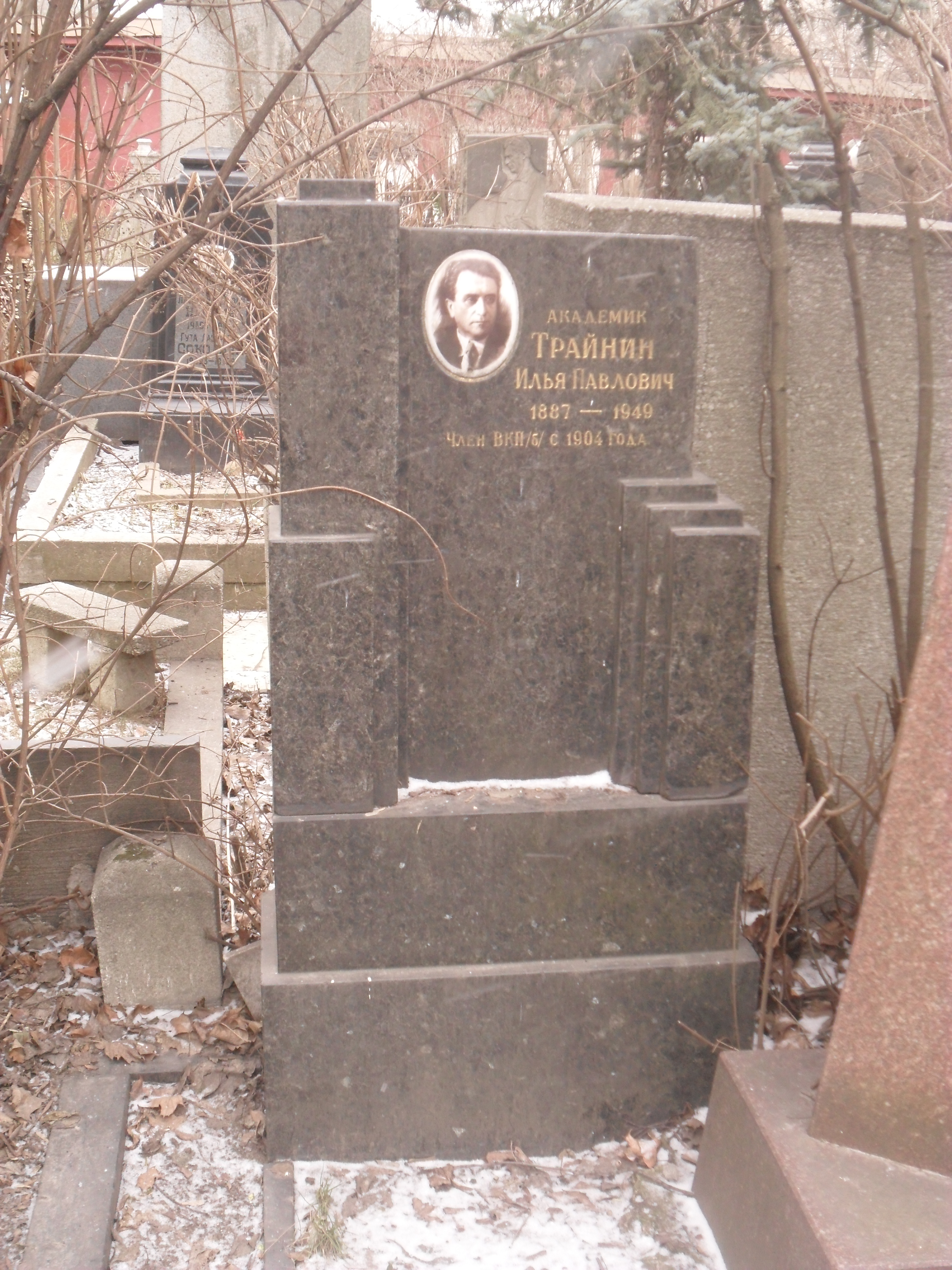
Grave in Novodevichy cemetery, Moscow

Ilya Pavlovich Trainin (26 December 1886, Riga – 27 June 1949, Moscow) was a Soviet lawyer and prominent jurist.

He began to attend a Marxist circle in Tiiga and joined the Bolshevik faction of the RSDLP in 1904. He participated in the armed uprising in Riga during the 1905 Revolution. He was subsequently arrested and though he escaped once he was recaptured and imprisoned for seven months in Riga. Officially exiled to Siberia, he illegally made his way to Poland and then on to Geneva, Switzerland. Here he remained, studying social sciences and participating in the revolutionary movement. He was secretary of the Vpered group.

He went to Samara in May 1917 and joined the Samara Revolutionary Committee at the time of the Bolshevik seizure of power in October that year. He was active in the Food Commissariat of the Samara Governorate and was elected to the Samara city and provincial executive committee of the Soviets, for whom he edited various magazines.
