= World Scientific =

Academic publisher of scientific, technical, and medical books

- Founded: 1981; 45 years ago
- Founder: Phua Kok Khoo; Doreen Liu
- Country of origin: Singapore
- Distribution: self-distributed (Singapore, United States); Marston Book Services (UK); Scholarly Book Services (Canada); Co Info (Australia)
- Publication types: Books, academic journals
- Official website: www.worldscientific.com

World Scientific Publishing is an academic publisher of scientific, technical, and medical books and journals headquartered in Singapore. The company was founded in 1981. It publishes about 600 books annually, with more than 170 journals in various fields. In 1995, World Scientific co-founded the London-based Imperial College Press together with the Imperial College of Science, Technology and Medicine.

== Company structure ==
The company head office is in Singapore. The Chairman and Editor-in-Chief is Dr Phua Kok Khoo, while the Managing Director is Doreen Liu. The company was co-founded by them in 1981.

=== Imperial College Press ===
In 1995 the company co-founded Imperial College Press, specializing in engineering, medicine and information technology, with Imperial College London. In 2006, World Scientific assumed full ownership of Imperial College Press, under a license granted by the university. Finally, in August 2016, ICP was fully incorporated into World Scientific under the new imprint, World Scientific Europe.

== See also ==
- Journals published by World Scientific
