= List of mathematics journals =

This is a list of scientific journals covering mathematics with existing Wikipedia articles on them.

== Alphabetic list of titles ==
=== A ===
- Abhandlungen aus dem Mathematischen Seminar der Universität Hamburg
- Abstract and Applied Analysis
- Acta Applicandae Mathematicae
- Acta Arithmetica
- Acta Mathematica
- Acta Mathematica Hungarica
- Acta Mathematica Sinica
- Acta Mathematicae Applicatae Sinica
- Acta Numerica
- Acta Scientiarum Mathematicarum
- Advances in Applied Clifford Algebras
- Advances in Applied Mathematics
- Advances in Computational Mathematics
- Advances in Difference Equations
- Advances in Geometry
- Advances in Mathematics
- Advances in Operator Theory
- Advances in Theoretical and Mathematical Physics
- Algebra & Number Theory
- Algebra Colloquium
- Algebra i Logika
- Algebra Universalis
- Algebraic & Geometric Topology
- Algebraic Combinatorics
- American Journal of Mathematics
- American Mathematical Monthly
- Analysis and Applications
- The Analyst, or, Mathematical Museum
- Annales Academiae Scientiarum Fennicae. Mathematica
- Annales de Gergonne
- Annales de l'Institut Fourier
- Annales Henri Poincaré
- Annales Scientifiques de l'École Normale Supérieure
- Annals of Applied Probability
- Annals of Combinatorics
- Annals of Functional Analysis
- Annals of Mathematical Statistics
- Annals of Mathematics
- Annals of Probability
- Annals of Statistics
- Applied Mathematics and Mechanics (English Edition)
- Archiv der Mathematik
- Archive for Mathematical Logic
- Archive for Rational Mechanics and Analysis
- Arkiv för Matematik
- Arnold Mathematical Journal
- Ars Combinatoria
- Ars Mathematica Contemporanea
- Asia-Pacific Journal of Operational Research
- Asian Journal of Mathematics
- AStA Advances in Statistical Analysis
- Astérisque
- Automation and Remote Control

=== B ===
- Banach Journal of Mathematical Analysis
- Biometrics
- Biometrika
- Biostatistics
- Brazilian Journal of Probability and Statistics
- Bulletin de la Société Mathématique de France
- Bulletin of Mathematical Biology
- Bulletin of Symbolic Logic
- Bulletin of the American Mathematical Society
- Bulletin of the Belgian Mathematical Society
- Bulletin of the London Mathematical Society
- Bulletin of Mathematical Sciences

=== C ===
- Cahiers de Topologie et Géométrie Différentielle Catégoriques
- Canadian Journal of Mathematics
- Canadian Mathematical Bulletin
- Central European Journal of Mathematics
- Chinese Annals of Mathematics, Series B
- College Mathematics Journal
- Combinatorica
- Commentarii Mathematici Helvetici
- Communications in Contemporary Mathematics
- Communications in Mathematical Physics
- Communications on Pure and Applied Mathematics
- Compositio Mathematica
- Comptes Rendus Mathématique
- Computing
- Constructive Approximation
- COSMOS
- Crelle's Journal (Journal fuer die Reine und Angewandte Mathematik)

=== D ===
- Differential Equations
- Discrete Analysis
- Discrete and Computational Geometry
- Discrete Mathematics
- Discrete Applied Mathematics
- Duke Mathematical Journal

=== E ===
- East Journal on Approximations
- Econometric Theory
- Educational Studies in Mathematics
- Electronic Journal of Combinatorics
- Electronic Journal of Probability
- Electronic Transactions on Numerical Analysis
- Elemente der Mathematik
- L'Enseignement mathématique
- Ergodic Theory and Dynamical Systems
- ESAIM: Control, Optimisation and Calculus of Variations
- Eureka
- European Journal of Combinatorics
- Experimental Mathematics
- Expositiones Mathematicae

=== F ===
- Fibonacci Quarterly
- Forum of Mathematics, Pi
- Forum of Mathematics, Sigma
- Fractals
- Fractional Calculus and Applied Analysis
- Fundamenta Mathematicae

=== G ===
- General Relativity and Gravitation
- Gentleman's Diary
- Geombinatorics
- Geometriae Dedicata
- Geometric and Functional Analysis
- Geometry & Topology
- Glasgow Mathematical Journal
- Groups, Geometry, and Dynamics

=== H ===
- Hacettepe Journal of Mathematics and Statistics
- Hardy–Ramanujan Journal
- Hiroshima Mathematical Journal
- Historia Mathematica
- Homology, Homotopy and Applications

=== I ===
- Illinois Journal of Mathematics
- IMA Journal of Management Mathematics
- Indagationes Mathematicae
- Indiana University Mathematics Journal
- Infinite Dimensional Analysis, Quantum Probability and Related Topics
- Integral Equations and Operator Theory
- Integral Transforms and Special Functions
- International Game Theory Review
- International Journal of Algebra and Computation
- International Journal of Biomathematics
- International Journal of Computational Geometry and Applications
- International Journal of Geometric Methods in Modern Physics
- International Journal of Mathematics
- International Journal of Mathematics and Computer Science
- International Journal of Mathematics and Mathematical Sciences
- International Journal of Number Theory
- International Journal of Shape Modeling
- International Mathematics Research Notices
- International Mathematics Research Surveys
- Inventiones Mathematicae
- Inverse Problems
- Involve
- Iranian Journal of Fuzzy Systems
- Israel Journal of Mathematics
- Izvestiya: Mathematics

=== J ===
- Journal d'Analyse Mathématique
- Journal de Mathématiques Pures et Appliquées
- Journal for Research in Mathematics Education
- Journal für die reine und angewandte Mathematik (see Crelle's Journal)
- Journal of Algebra
- Journal of Algebra and Its Applications
- Journal of Algebraic Combinatorics
- Journal of Applied Mathematics and Mechanics
- Journal of Approximation Theory
- Journal of Business & Economic Statistics
- Journal of Combinatorial Theory
- Journal of Computational Physics
- Journal of Cryptology
- Journal of Differential Geometry
- Journal of Fluid Mechanics
- Journal of Formalized Reasoning
- Journal of Graph Theory
- Journal of Group Theory
- Journal of Hyperbolic Differential Equations
- Journal of Industrial and Management Optimization
- Journal of Integer Sequences
- Journal of Knot Theory and Its Ramifications
- Journal of Logic and Analysis
- Journal of Mathematical Biology
- Journal of Mathematical Logic
- Journal of Mathematical Physics
- Journal of Mathematics Teacher Education
- Journal of Nonlinear Mathematical Physics
- Journal of Number Theory
- Journal of Online Mathematics and its Applications
- Journal of Physics A
- Journal of Recreational Mathematics
- Journal of Statistical Mechanics: Theory and Experiment
- Journal of Symbolic Computation
- Journal of Symbolic Logic
- Journal of the American Mathematical Society
- Journal of the American Statistical Association
- Journal of the Australian Mathematical Society
- Journal of the British Society for the History of Mathematics
- Journal of the European Mathematical Society
- Journal of the London Mathematical Society
- Journal of the Royal Statistical Society
- Journal of Theoretical Biology

=== K ===
- Középiskolai Matematikai és Fizikai Lapok

=== L ===
- Letters in Mathematical Physics
- Linear Algebra and its Applications
- LMS Journal of Computation and Mathematics

=== M ===
- MAA FOCUS
- Matematicheskii Sbornik
- Math Horizons
- Mathematical Biosciences
- Mathematical Correspondent
- The Mathematical Diary
- The Mathematical Gazette
- Mathematical Geosciences
- The Mathematical Intelligencer
- Mathematical Models and Methods in Applied Sciences
- Mathematical Notes
- Mathematical Proceedings of the Cambridge Philosophical Society
- Mathematical Programming
- Mathematical Reviews
- Mathematics
- Mathematics and Computer Education
- Mathematics and Mechanics of Complex Systems
- The Mathematics Educator
- The Mathematics Enthusiast
- Mathematics Magazine
- Mathematics of Computation
- Mathematics of Control, Signals, and Systems
- Mathematics of Operations Research
- Mathematika
- Mathematische Annalen
- Mathematische Zeitschrift
- Memoirs of the American Mathematical Society
- Messenger of Mathematics (now defunct)
- Michigan Mathematical Journal
- Monatshefte für Mathematik
- Moscow Mathematical Journal

=== N ===
- Networks and Spatial Economics
- New Mathematics and Natural Computation
- The New York Journal of Mathematics
- Nieuw Archief voor Wiskunde
- Nonlinear Oscillations
- Nonlinearity (journal)
- Notices of the American Mathematical Society
- Nouvelles Annales de Mathématiques
- Numerical Methods for Partial Differential Equations
- Numerische Mathematik

=== O ===
- Open Mathematics
- Open Systems & Information Dynamics
- Operations Research
- Opuscula Mathematica
- Order

=== P ===
- Pacific Journal of Mathematics
- Philosophy of Mathematics Education Journal
- Portugaliae Mathematica
- PRIMUS
- Probability Surveys
- Probability Theory and Related Fields
- Probability and Mathematical Statistics
- Proceedings - Mathematical Sciences
- Proceedings of A. Razmadze Mathematical Institute
- Proceedings of Symposia in Pure Mathematics
- Proceedings of the American Mathematical Society
- Proceedings of the London Mathematical Society
- Proceedings of the Royal Society A
- Proceedings of the Steklov Institute of Mathematics
- Publicationes Mathematicae Debrecen
- Publications Mathématiques de l'IHÉS

=== Q ===
- Quarterly Journal of Mathematics
- The Quarterly Journal of Mechanics and Applied Mathematics
- The Quarterly Journal of Pure and Applied Mathematics
- Queueing Systems

=== R ===
- RACSAM
- The Ramanujan Journal
- Real Analysis Exchange
- Rejecta Mathematica
- Rendiconti del Circolo Matematico di Palermo
- Rendiconti del Seminario Matematico della Università di Padova
- Rendiconti del Seminario Matematico Università e Politecnico di Torino
- Rendiconti di Matematica e delle sue Applicazioni
- Reports on Mathematical Physics
- Research in Number Theory
- Results in Mathematics
- Reviews in Mathematical Physics
- Ricerche di Matematica
- Risk Analysis (journal)
- Rivista di Matematica della Università di Parma
- Review of Symbolic Logic
- Revista Colombiana de Estadística
- Rocky Mountain Journal of Mathematics
- Russian Mathematical Surveys

=== S ===
- Scripta Mathematica
- Semigroup Forum
- SIAM Journal on Applied Mathematics
- SIAM Journal on Discrete Mathematics
- SIAM Journal on Matrix Analysis and Applications
- SIAM Journal on Numerical Analysis
- SIAM Review
- Siberian Mathematical Journal
- Simon Stevin
- Statistics and Computing
- Statistics in Medicine
- Statistics Surveys
- Stochastic Models
- Stochastic Processes and Their Applications
- Stochastics and Dynamics
- Studia Mathematica
- Studies in Applied Mathematics

=== T ===
- Taiwanese Journal of Mathematics
- Theoretical Biology and Medical Modelling
- Theory of Probability and Its Applications
- Tohoku Mathematical Journal
- Topology
- Topology and Its Applications
- Transactions of the American Mathematical Society
- Turkish Journal of Mathematics

=== Z ===
- Zeitschrift für Angewandte Mathematik und Physik

== See also ==
- arXiv, an electronic preprint archive
- List of computer science journals
- List of mathematical physics journals
- List of probability journals
- List of publications in mathematics
- List of scientific journals
- List of statistics journals
- List of MATLAB software and tools
- List of mathematics software
- List of open-source software for mathematics
