= List of mathematical physics journals =

This is a list of peer-reviewed scientific journals published in the field of Mathematical Physics.

- Advances in Theoretical and Mathematical Physics
- Annales Henri Poincaré
- Archive for Rational Mechanics and Analysis
- Communications in Mathematical Physics
- General Relativity and Gravitation
- International Journal of Geometric Methods in Modern Physics
- Journal of Geometry and Physics
- Journal of Mathematical Physics
- Journal of Mathematical Physics, Analysis, Geometry
- Journal of Modern Dynamics
- Journal of Nonlinear Mathematical Physics
- Journal of Physics A: Mathematical and Theoretical
- Journal of Statistical Physics
- Letters in Mathematical Physics
- Mathematics and Mechanics of Complex Systems
- Open Communications in Nonlinear Mathematical Physics
- Probability and Mathematical Physics
- Reports on Mathematical Physics
- Reviews in Mathematical Physics
- The Quarterly Journal of Mechanics and Applied Mathematics
- Középiskolai Matematikai és Fizikai Lapok
- SIGMA (Symmetry, Integrability and Geometry: Methods and Applications)
- Teoreticheskaya i Matematicheskaya Fizika (Theoretical and Mathematical Physics), Steklov Mathematical Institute

== See also ==
- List of mathematics journals
- List of physics journals
- List of scientific journals
- List of statistics journals
