= Michael Vaughan-Lee =

Mathematician

Michael Rogers Vaughan-Lee is a mathematician and retired academic. He was Professor of Mathematics at the University of Oxford from 1996 to 2010 and a tutor at Christ Church, Oxford, between 1971 and 2010.

== Career ==
Vaughan-Lee completed his Doctor of Philosophy (DPhil) degree at the University of Oxford in 1968 and then taught at Vanderbilt University for two years as an assistant professor. In 1970, he was appointed to a lectureship at the University of Queensland, but resigned the following year and returned to the United Kingdom to become a tutor in mathematics at Christ Church, Oxford, where he remained until he retired in 2010. In 1996, he was awarded the title of Professor of Mathematics by the University of Oxford; since retirement in 2010, he has been an emeritus professor.

== Research ==
Vaughan-Lee specialises in group theory, especially the restricted Burnside problem. He has also made contributions relating to Engel Lie algebras, computational algebra, and other areas.

=== Selected publications ===
- "Lie rings of groups of prime exponent", Journal of the Australian Mathematical Society, vol. 49 (1990), pp. 386–398.
- The Restricted Burnside Problem (Oxford University Press, 1st ed., 1990; 2nd ed., 1993).
- (with E. I. Zel'manov) "Upper bounds in the restricted Burnside problem", Journal of Algebra, vol. 162 (1993), pp. 107–145.
- "An algorithm for computing graded algebras", Journal of Symbolic Computation, vol. 16 (1993), pp. 345–354.
- "The nilpotency class of finite groups of exponent p", Transactions of the American Mathematical Society, vol. 346 (1994), pp. 617–640.
- (with E. I. Zel'manov) "Upper bounds in the restricted Burnside problem II", International Journal of Algebra and Computation, vol. 6 (1996), pp. 735–744.
- "Engel-4 groups of exponent 5", Proceedings of the London Mathematical Society, vol. 74 (1997), pp. 306–334.
- "Superalgebras and dimensions of algebras", International Journal of Algebra and Computation, vol. 8 (1998), pp. 97–125.
- (with M. F. Newman) "Engel-4 groups of exponent 5. II. Orders", Proceedings of the London Mathematical Society, vol. 79 (1999), pp. 283–317.
- (with E. I. Zel'manov) "Bounds in the restricted Burnside problem", Journal of the Australian Mathematical Society, vol. 67 (1999), pp. 261–271.
- (with Daniel Groves) "Finite groups of bounded exponent", Bulletin of the London Mathematical Society, vol. 35 (2003), pp. 37–40.
- "Simple Lie Algebras of Low Dimension Over GF (2)", LMS Journal of Computation and Mathematics, vol. 9 (2006), pp. pp. 174–192.
- "On 4-Engel Groups", LMS Journal of Computation and Mathematics, vol. 10 (2007), pp. 341–353.
