= Asım Orhan Barut =

Turkish-American theoretical physicist (1926–1994)

- Born: 6 June 1926; Malatya, Turkey
- Died: 5 December 1994 (aged 68); Boulder, Colorado
- Education: Eidgenössische Technische Hochschule Zürich, Switzerland
- Known for: Electrodynamics and classical theory of particles and fields, quantum field theory, elementary particles and group theory, Barut–Girardello coherent states
- Scientific career
- Fields: High energy physics, quantum electrodynamics, and relativity
- Workplaces: University of Chicago; Reed College; Syracuse University; University of Colorado

Asım Orhan Barut (June 6, 1926 – December 5, 1994) was a Turkish-American theoretical physicist.

== Education ==
He received both his undergraduate diploma and his Ph.D. degree from the Swiss Federal Institute of Technology in Zurich in 1949 and 1952, respectively. He pursued his postdoctoral studies at the University of Chicago during 1953–1954.

== Academic life ==
Barut was an assistant professor at Reed College during 1954-55 and then joined the faculty at Syracuse University in 1956. He became a professor of physics at the University of Colorado at Boulder in 1962 and served for 32 years.

== Research areas ==
His research interests centered on group theoretic methods in physics. His books include Theory of the Scattering Matrix, Electrodynamics and Classical Theory of Fields and Particles and Representations of Noncompact Groups and Applications. Asım Orhan Barut was elected a fellow of the American Physical Society in 1966.

== Publications ==
=== Books ===
- Theory of group representations and applications, (2nd edition) Barut, Asim O.; Raczka, Ryszard, 1980, ISBN 83-01-02716-9, Polish Science Publishers, Varsovie.
- Quantum Systems, Barut, Asim O.; Feranchuk, I. D.; Shnir, Yu M., 1995, ISBN 9810220995, World Scientific Publishing Company, Incorporated.
- Polarization Dynamics in Nuclear & Particle Physics, Barut, Asim O., Paver, N.; Penzo, A.; Raczka, R., 1993, ISBN 9810214235, World Scientific Publishing Company.
- Spin & Polarization Dynamics in Nuclear & Particle Physics, 1990, ISBN 9810200188, World Scientific Publishing Company.
- New Frontiers in Quantum Electrodynamics & Quantum Optics, Barut, Asim O., 1990, ISBN 0306436698, Plenum Publishing Corporation.
- Geometry & Physics, Barut, Asim O., 1989, ISBN 8870882241, American Institute of Physics (A I P Press).
- Dynamical Groups & Spectrum Generating Algebra, Barut, Asim O.; Bohm, A.; Ne'Eman, Yuval, 1988, ISBN 0318420643, World Scientific Publishing Company.
- Dynamical Groups & Spectrum Generating Algebra, Barut, Asim O.; Bohm, A.; Ne'Eman, Yuval, 1988, ISBN 9971501473, World Scientific Publishing Company.
- Scattering Theory, Barut, Asim O. 1969, ISBN 0677127308, Gordon & Breach Publishing Group.
- Electrodynamics and Classical Theory of Fields and Particles, 1964, Macmillan Company. 2012 Dover reprint ISBN 9780486158716

=== Editorships ===
- Selected Scientific Papers of E. U. Condon, Barut, Asim O., 1991, ISBN 0387974202, Springer-Verlag New York.
- Selected Popular Writings of E. U. Condon, Barut, Asim O., 1991, ISBN 0387974210, Springer-Verlag New York.
- Selected Scientific Papers of Alfred Landé, Barut, Asim O. (ed.), 1987, ISBN 9027725942, Kluwer Academic Publishers.
- Conformal Groups & Related Symmetries - Physical Results & Mathematical Background, Barut, Asim O. (ed.), 1986, ISBN 0387171630, Springer-Verlag New York.
- Quantum Space & Time - The Quest Continues, Barut, Asim O. (ed.), 1984, ISBN 0521319110, Cambridge University Press.
- Quantum Electrodynamics & Quantum Optics, Barut, Asim O. (ed.), 1984, ISBN 0306417308, Plenum Publishing Corporation.
- Quantum Theory, Groups, Fields & Particles, Barut, Asim O. (ed.), 1983, ISBN 9027715521, Kluwer Academic Publishers.
- Electrodynamics & Classical Theory of Fields & Particles, Barut, Asim O., 1980, ISBN 0486640388, Dover Publications, Incorporated.
- Foundations of Radiation Theory & Quantum Electrodynamics, Barut, Asim O. (ed.), 1980, ISBN 0306402777, Plenum Publishing Corporation.
- Group Theory in Non-Linear Problems, NATO Advanced Study Institute, Barut, Asim O. (ed.), 1974, ISBN 9027704120, Kluwer Academic Publishers.
- Studies in Mathematical Physics, NATO Advanced Study Institute, Barut, Asim O. (ed.), 1973, ISBN 9027704058, Kluwer Academic Publishers.
- Lectures in Theoretical Physics, Barut, Asim O. (ed.), 1973, ISBN 0870810472, University Press of Colorado.
- Boulder Lecture Notes in Theoretical Physics, Barut, Asim O. (ed.), 1967, ISBN 0677129009, Gordon & Breach Publishing Group.

=== Journal articles ===
A representative sample of key publications.

Extended content

In Physical Review

1. 1950 the Cathode Field in Diodes under Partial Space-Charge Conditions with Initial Velocities
2. 1951 Erratum the Cathode Field in Diodes under Partial Space-Charge Conditions with Initial Velocities
3. 1954 the Mechanism of Secondary Electron Emission
4. 1957 Distribution Functions for Noncommuting Operators
5. 1958 Covariant Quantum Statistics of Fields
6. 1960 Spin-Orbit Correlations in μ-E and E--E- Scattering
7. 1961 Boson Currents in the Theory of Weak Interactions
8. 1961 Kinematical and Dynamical Resonances
9. 1962 Analyticity in Angular Momentum of the Relativistic Many-Channel S Matrix from Dispersion Relations and Unitarity
10. 1962 Complex Angular Momentum in Relativistic S-Matrix Theory
11. 1962 Formulation of the Scattering Functions in Terms of the Unitary Representations of the Inhomogeneous Lorentz Group
12. 1962 Singularities in Angular Momentum of the Scattering Amplitude for a Class of Soluble Potentials
13. 1962 Virtual Particles
14. 1963 Construction of Invariant Scattering Amplitudes for Arbitrary Spins and Analytic Continuation in Total Angular Momentum
15. 1963 Crossing Symmetry in S-Matrix Theory
16. 1964 Connection between the Relativistic and Nonrelativistic Form of the Nucleon-Nucleon Amplitude
17. 1964 Dynamical Symmetry Group Based on Dirac Equation and Its Generalization to Elementary Particles
18. 1964 I=0 Pion-Pion Amplitude and S Di-Pion
19. 1964 Nucleon and the Pion-Nucleon Trajectory. Determination of the Pion-Nucleon Coupling Constant
20. 1964 Secondary Diffraction Peaks in Pn and Kn Scatterings
21. 1965 Dynamical Groups and Mass Formula
22. 1965 Dynamics of a Broken Sun Symmetry for the Oscillator
23. 1965 Mass Difference of =- and =0
24. 1965 Production Amplitudes. I. Construction of Invariant Amplitudes
25. 1965 Production Amplitudes. Ii. Partial-Wave Decomposition and Analytic Continuation in Total Angular Momentum
26. 1966 Consequences of Three Discrete Internal Symmetry Transformations for Leptons
27. 1966 Near Forward Peaks in the K-P and P-P Charge-Exchange Scattering
28. 1967 Calculation of Relativistic Transition Probabilities and Form Factors from Noncompact Groups
29. 1967 Calculation of Transition Probabilities from Noncompact Dynamical Groups
30. 1967 Current Operators and Majorana Equation for the Hydrogen Atom from Dynamical Groups
31. 1967 Dynamical Group O(4, 2) for Baryons and the Behavior of Form Factors
32. 1967 Meson Decay Rates in O(4, 2) and the Introduction of Su(3)
33. 1967 Resonance Decays from O(3, 1) Dynamics. a Regularity in the Partial Decay Widths
34. 1967 Strong Decays of Higher Spin Baryon Resonances in O(4,2) Theory
35. 1967 Transition Form Factors in the H Atom
36. 1967 Transition Probabilities of the Hydrogen Atom from Noncompact Dynamical Groups
37. 1968 High-Energy Proton-Proton Scattering and Nucleon Structure
38. 1968 Derivation of Mass Spectrum and Magnetic Moments from Current Conservation
39. 1968 Magnetic Moments, Form Factors, and Mass Spectrum of Baryons
40. 1968 Position Operators and Localizability of Quantum Systems Described By Finite- and Infinite-Dimensional Wave Equations
41. 1968 Reformulation of the Dirac Theory of the Electron
42. 1969 Calculation of the Kl3 Form Factors
43. 1969 Theory of the Heavy Electron
44. 1969 Theory of the Relativistic H Atom and Positronium
45. 1970 Very-High-Energy Limit of Proton-Proton Scattering
46. 1970 Crossing Symmetry in the O(4, 2) Formulation of the Dirac Theory
47. 1970 Realization of Current-Algebra Commutation Relations on the Space of Solutions
48. 1970 Simply Factorizable N-Point Amplitude
49. 1971 Nonrelativistic and Relativistic Coulomb Amplitude as the Matrix Element of a Rotation in O(4,2)
50. 1971 Proton Form Factor, Magnetic Charges, and Dyonium
51. 1972 Infinite-Component Wave Equations and Mass Splittings Within Su(3) and Su(2) Multiplets
52. 1972 Value of the Zeta Parameter in Kl3 Decay from the Pion-Gauge Condition
53. 1973 Kl3 and Pe3 Decays in Terms of the Kemmer Beta Current
54. 1973 New Relativistic Coulomb Hamiltonian with O(4) Symmetry and a Spinor Realization of the Dynamical Group O(4,2)
55. 1974 Electrodynamics in Terms of Retarded Fields
56. 1974 Relativistic Composite Systems and Minimal Coupling
57. 1974 Relativistic Transition Amplitudes in a Class of O(4,2) Infinite Multiplets. I
58. 1974 Relativistic Transition Amplitudes in a Class of O(4,2) Infinite Multiplets. Ii
59. 1974 Spin-Statistics Connection for Dyonium
60. 1974 Theory of the Electromagnetic Structure Functions of the Proton
61. 1976 Electromagnetic Polarizabilities of Nucleons
62. 1976 Inelastic Transition Form Factors in the H Atom
63. 1976 Infinite-Component Fields. I. Electromagnetic Inelastic Form Factors and Structure Functions of the Proton
64. 1976 Infinite-Component Fields. Ii. the Electromagnetic Structure of Bosons
65. 1977 Form-Factor Corrections to Superpositronium and Short-Distance Behavior of the Magnetic Moment of the Electron
66. 1979 Kl3 Form Factors
67. 1979 Lepton Mass Formula.
68. 1981 Magnetic-Moment Operator of the Relativistic Electron
69. 1981 New Type of Vacuum Solutions of Nonlinear Conformally Covariant Coupled Field Equations
70. 1981 Zitterbewegung and the Internal Geometry of the Electron
71. 1982 Upper Limit on the Magnetic Moment of the Neutrino
72. 1983 Neutrino and Antineutrino Elastic Scattering and Photoneutrino Reactions
73. 1983 Capture of a Dirac Monopole by a Magnetic Dipole
74. 1983 Erratum New Type of Vacuum Solutions of Nonlinear Conformally Covariant Coupled Field Equations
75. 1983 Negative-Norm States, Superselection Rules, and the Lepton Family
76. 1983 Relativistic Oscillator Linearly Rising Trajectories and Structure Functions
77. 1984 Classical Model of the Dirac Electron
78. 1984 Complex-Energy Solutions of the Relativistic Kepler Problem at High Energies
79. 1984 Path-Integral Derivation of the Dirac Propagator
80. 1984 Rotational Invariance, Locality, and Einstein-Podolsky-Rosen Experiments
81. 1985 Covariant Generalization of the Zitterbewegung of the Electron and Its So(4,2) and So(3,2) Internal Algebras
82. 1985 Photoproduction of a Neutrino Pair from an Electron and Astrophysical Implications of Neutrino-Emission Processes
83. 1985 Quantum Electrodynamics Based on Self-Energy: Lamb Shift and Spontaneous Emission without Field Quantization
84. 1985 Zitterbewegung of the Electron in External Fields
85. 1986 Quantum Electrodynamics Based on Self-Energy versus Quantization of Fields
86. 1987 Quantum Electrodynamics Based on Self-Energy, without Second Quantization: the Lamb Shift and Long-Range Casimir-Polder Van Der Waals Forces near Boundaries
87. 1987 Exact Solutions of the Dirac Equation in Spatially Flat Robertson-Walker Space-Times
88. 1988 Path Integration via Hamilton-Jacobi Coordinates and Applications to Potential Barriers
89. 1988 Quantum Electrodynamics Based on Self-Fields, without Second Quantization
90. 1988 Relativistic Theory of Spontaneous Emission
91. 1989 Analytic Group-Theoretical Form Factors of Hydrogenlike Atoms for Discrete and Continuum Transitions
92. 1989 Generalization of the Lorentz-Dirac Equation to Include Spin
93. 1989 Quantum Electrodynamics Based on Self-Fields, without Second Quantization Ii
94. 1990 Self-Field Quantum Electrodynamics the Two-Level Atom
95. 1990 Pair Production in an Electric Field in a Time-Dependent Gauge
96. 1990 Quantum Electrodynamics Based on Self-Fields
97. 1990 Regularized Analytic Evaluation of Vacuum Polarization in a Coulomb Field
98. 1991 Interpretation of Self-Field Quantum Electrodynamics
99. 1991 Qed Based on Self-Energy
100. 1992 Band Structure for Neutral Magnetic Dipoles in a Periodic Magnetic Field
101. 1992 Relativistic Theory of the Lamb Shift in Self-Field Quantum Electrodynamics
102. 1992 Retarded Radiation Field and Spontaneous Emission for the Hydrogen Atom as An Emitting Antenna
103. 1993 Measurement of Time-Dependent Quantum Phases
104. 1994 Quantization of Constraint Solutions

In Journal of Mathematical Physics

1. 1961 Analytical Properties of S Matrix and Uniqueness of the Scattering Potential
2. 1963 Behavior of the Scattering Amplitude for Large Angular Momentum
3. 1964 Complex Lorentz Group with a Real Metric Group Structure
4. 1966 Asymptotic Behavior of the Scattering Amplitude in the Left Half-Plane of Complex Angular Momentum
5. 1966 on Irreducible Representation of a Class of Algebras and Related Projective Representations
6. 1966 Unitary and Antiunitary Ray Representations of the Product of N Commuting Parity Operators
7. 1967 Tensor Operators and Mass Formula in the Minimal Extension of U3 by Charge Conjugation
8. 1970 Reduction of a Class of O(4, 2) Representations with Respect to So(4, 1) and So(3, 2)
9. 1971 So(4, 2)-Formulation of the Symmetry Breaking in Relativistic Kepler Problems with Or without Magnetic Charges
10. 1974 Unification of the External Conformal Symmetry Group and the Internal Conformal Dynamical Group
11. 1976 Angular Momentum of Systems of Electric and Magnetic Charges and of Singular Flux Surfaces
12. 1976 Solution of the Dirac Equation with Coulomb and Magnetic Moment Interactions#1962 Virtual Particles
13. 1976 Some New Identities of the Clebsch–Gordan Coefficients and Representation Functions of So(2,1) and So(4)
14. 1979 Quantum Theory of Infinite Component Fields
15. 1980 Magnetic Resonances between Massive and Massless Spin- 12 Particles with Magnetic Moments
16. 1980 Narrow Resonances as an Eigenvalue Problem and Applications to High Energy Magnetic Resonances
17. 1985 Bound States, Resonances, and Symmetries of a Neutral Dirac Particle with Anomalous Magnetic Moment, Coupled to a Fixed Monopole
18. 1985 Compact Quantum Systems Internal Geometry of Relativistic Systems
19. 1985 Relativistic Quantum Theory of Fermions Based on the Clifford Algebra C7
20. 1986 An Exactly Soluble Relativistic Quantum Two-Fermion Problem
21. 1987 the Generalized Morse Oscillator in the So(4,2) Dynamical Group Scheme
22. 1988 Comment on the Paper An Exactly Soluble Relativistic Quantum Two-Fermion Problem
23. 1991 the Covariant Many-Body Problem in Quantumelectrodynamics
24. 1992 on Some Mathematical Problems in the Evaluation of Fields Produced By Currents Which Are Generalized Functions
25. 1993 New Approach to the Determination of Eigenvalues and Eigenfunctions for a Relativistic Two-Fermion Equation
26. 1994 Symmetry Scattering for Su(2,2) with Applications

In Journal of Physics A: Mathematical and Theoretical

1. 1975 Radiation Damping of Electron in a Gravitational-Field
2. 1975 Radiation Reaction and Mass Renormalization in Scalar and Tensor Fields and Linearized Gravitation
3. 1976 Conformally Invariant Action-At-A-Distance Electrodynamics
4. 1977 Perturbation-Theory for Infinite-Component Wave-Equations
5. 1977 Interpretation of Space-Like Solutions of Infinite-Component Wave-Equations and Grodsky-Streater No-Go Theorem
6. 1978 Covariant Field Equations for an Electromagnetic String with Mass Points At Ends
7. 1981 on the Dynamical Group of the Charge-Monopole System
8. 1981 Completely Integrable N-Body Quantum-Systems in 3-Dimensions
9. 1982 on Conformally Covariant Spin-2 and Spin-3/2equations
10. 1982 Completely Integrable N-Body Quantum-Systems in 3 Dimensions .2. N Identical Spin-1/2 Fermions
11. 1983 a Family of Groups Generalizing the Poincare Group and Their Physical Applications
12. 1987 a New Realization of Dynamic Groups and Factorization Method
13. 1987 Algebraic Treatment of 2nd Poschl-Teller, Morse-Rosen and Eckart Equations
14. 1987 Path Integral Treatment of the Hydrogen-Atom in a Curved Space of Constant Curvature
15. 1990 the Remarkable Algebra So-Star-(2n), Its Representations, Its Clifford-Algebra and Potential Applications
16. 1990 Path Integral Treatment of the Hydrogen-Atom in a Curved Space of Constant Curvature .2. Hyperbolic Space
17. 1990 the Classical Relativistic 2-Body Problem with Spin and Self-Interactions
18. 1993 Space Reflections in the Dichotomic Magnetic Charge Model
19. 1993 Classical Relativistic Spinning Particle with Anomalous Magnetic-Moment - the Precession of Spin
20. 1994 the Exponential Map for the Conformal-Group O(2, 4)
21. 1994 the Exponential Map for the Unitary-Group Su(2,2)

In Journal of Physics B: Atomic, Molecular and Optical Physics

1. 1973 Hydrogen-Atom as a Relativistic Elementary Particle .1. Wave-Equation and Mass Formulas
2. 1973 Hydrogen-Atom as a Relativistic Elementary Particle .2. Relativistic Scattering Problems and Photo-Effect
3. 1975 Dilatation of Nonrelativistic Wavefunctions into Relativistic Form
4. 1983 Period Doubling in the N+L Filling Rule and Dynamical Symmetry of the Demkov-Ostrovsky Atomic Model
5. 1984 on the Dynamical Symmetry of the Periodic Table .2. Modified Demkov-Ostrovsky Atomic Model
6. 1991 Contribution of the Individual Discrete Levels to the Lamb Shift in Hydrogen-Atoms

In Foundations of Physics

1. 1976 New Theory of Positronium Decay and Relativistic Wave-Function Corrections
2. 1975 Electrodynamics in Terms of Functions Over Group Su(2) .1. Equation of Vector Potential
3. 1982 Electrodynamics in Terms of Functions Over the Group Su(2) .2. Quantization
4. 1981 Nonperturbative Quantum Electrodynamics - the Lamb Shift
5. 1983 on Conservation of Parity and Time-Reversal and Composite Models of Particles
6. 1985 on the Gyromagnetic Ratio in the Kaluza-Klein Theories and the Schuster-Blackett Law
7. 1987 Irreversibility, Organization, and Self-Organization in Quantum Electrodynamics
8. 1988 Combining Relativity and Quantum-Mechanics - Schrödinger Interpretation of Psi
9. 1990 Joint Probabilities of Noncommuting Operators and Incompleteness of Quantum-Mechanics
10. 1990 Quantum-Theory of Single Events - Localized De Broglie Wavelets, Schrödinger Waves, and Classical Trajectories
11. 1992 How to Avoid Quantum Paradoxes
12. 1992 Particle-Like Configurations of the Electromagnetic-Field - An Extension of Debroglie Ideas
13. 1993 on Poisson Brackets and Symplectic Structures for the Classical and Quantum Zitterbewegung
14. 1994 on the Formulation of Electrodynamics from a Single Principle
15. 1994 Debating the Final Theory
16. 1994 Conformal Space-Times - the Arenas of Physics and Cosmology
17. 1995 Quantum-Theory of Single Events Continued - Accelerating Wavelets and the Stern-Gerlach Experiment
18. 1998 Spinor Field as Elementary Excitations of a System of Scalar Fields
19. 1998 the Energy Momentum Tensor for Electromagnetic Interactions

In Physics Letters A

1. 1976 New Theory of Positronium Decay and Relativistic Wave-Function Corrections
2. 1978 Solutions of Non-Linear Equations Simulating Pair Production and Pair Annihilation
3. 1979 Hydrogenium and Hydrogenium-Ion
4. 1981 Conformal Covariance and the Probability Interpretation of Wave-Equations
5. 1984 a Classical-Model of Electron-Paramagnetic-Res Experiment with Quantum-Mechanical Correlations and Bell Inequalities
6. 1985 on the Dynamical Group of the Kepler-Problem in a Curved Space of Constant Curvature
7. 1988 Lorentz-Dirac Equation and Energy-Conservation for Radiating Electrons
8. 1990 E=H-Omega
9. 1990 Methods of Solution of the Schrödinger-Equations for a Class of Anharmonic and Singular Potentials
10. 1990 on the Interpretation of the Spinor Phase-Change in a Magnetic-Field in Neutron Interferometry
11. 1991 Path Integral Quantization of the Magnetic Top
12. 1992 More on the Radiation Reaction and Runaway Solutions in Classical Electrodynamics
13. 1993 Formulation of Wave Mechanics without the Planck Constant-H
14. 1993 on the Dynamic Group of the System of 2 Anyons with Coulomb Interaction
15. 1993 Localized Tachyonic Wavelet Solutions of the Wave-Equation
16. 1994 Localized Rotating Wavelets with Half-Integer Spin
17. 1994 Algebraic Perturbation-Theory for Singular Potentials
18. 1995 Su(1,1) Perturbations of the Simple Harmonic-Oscillator
19. 1995 Self-Field Quantum Electrodynamics without Infinities - a New Calculation of Vacuum Polarization

In Physics Letters B

1. 1972 Superselection Rule for Magnetic Charges and Search for Magnetic Monopoles
2. 1973 Improved Calculation of Structure Functions of Nucleon in O(4,2)-Infinite Multiplet Model
3. 1976 Magnetic Charge and Hyperfine Splitting in Hydrogen
4. 1977 Soliton Solutions of Infinite Component Wave-Equations
5. 1978 Mass of Muon
6. 1979 Renormalizable Field-Theories with Multiple Fermionic Excitations
7. 1981 the Wave-Equation for the Electron-Muon System and Their Neutrinos
8. 1981 Derivation and Uniqueness of Vacuum Solutions of Conformally Covariant Coupled Non-Linear Field-Equations
9. 1984 a Generalized Local U(1) Gauge-Invariance for Both the Standard and Pauli Couplings of Qed
10. 1989 Equivalence of the Spinning Superparticle Descriptions with Grassmann Variables or with C-Number Spinors
11. 1990 Excited-States of Zitterbewegung
12. 1993 Diracs Shell-Model of the Electron and the General-Theory of Moving Relativistic Charged Membranes
13. 1993 Radiation Reaction for the Classical Relativistic Spinning Particle in Scalar, Tensor and Linearized Gravitational-Fields
14. 1994 Radiation Reaction and the Electromagnetic Energy-Momentum of Moving Relativistic Charged Membranes

In Letters in Mathematical Physics

1. 1976 Mass-Spectrum In Relativistic Extended Models of Elementary-Particles
2. 1977 Charge Quantization Condition with N Strings - New Internal Quantum Number of Charge-Monopole Systems
3. 1979 Backlund Transformations and New Solutions of Non-Linear Wave-Equations in 4-Dimensional Space-Time
4. 1983 A Duality Between Massless Particles and a Charge-Monopole System
5. 1984 The Zitterbewegung of The Neutrino
6. 1985 Massive Narrow Resonance Solutions of Strongly Coupled Relativistic-Particles - A Mechanism of Mass Generation
7. 1986 The 4 States of The Massless Neutrino with Pauli Coupling by Spin-Gauge Invariance
8. 1988 The Spinning Minimal-Surfaces without the Grassmann Variables

In Modern Physics Letters A

1. 1993 Dynamical Groups and Supersymmetry .2. Supersymmetric Aharonov-Bohm and Anyon Systems
2. 1993 the Lamb Shift in the Charge-Magnetic Monopole System
3. 1993 on Parity Conservation and the Question of the Missing (Right-Handed) Neutrino
4. 1992 a Covariant Canonical Decomposition of the Bosonic and Spinning Extended Objects with Electric Charge
5. 1988 Conformally Covariant Coupled Non-Linear Field-Theory on the Hypercone - Vacuum Solutions and Quantization of Normal-Modes

In Helvetica Physica Acta

1. 1973 Conformal Group-]Schrödinger Group-]Dynamical Group - Maximal Kinematical Group Of Massive Schrödinger Particle
2. 1976 Nonlinear 0(N + 1)-Symmetric Field-Theories, Symmetry Breaking And Finite-Energy Solutions
3. 1989 Relativistic 2-Body Problem In Quantum Electrodynamics
4. 1993 The Cartan Formalism In-Field Theory
5. 1993 Nonspreading Coherent States Riding On Kepler Orbits
6. 1994 Spacetime Models From The Electromagnetic-Field

In Nuovo Cimento Della Societa Italiana Di Fisica A - Nuclei Particles and Fields

1. 1970 a Unified Treatment of Leptons
2. 1974 Classical Relativistic Scattering of 2 Dyons
3. 1973 Conformally Invariant Massive Spinor Equations .1.
4. 1973 Conformally Invariant Massive and Massless Spinor Equations .2. Solutions of Wave-Equations
5. 1982 on the Shape of Tachyons
6. 1989 Angular-Distribution in Electron-Neutrino Scattering and the Anomalous Magnetic-Moment of the Neutrino
7. 1993 on the New Constants of the Motion of the Free Dirac Electron

In Nuovo Cimento Della Societa Italiana Di Fisica B - General Physics Relativity Astronomy and Mathematical Physics and Methods

1. 1976 Quantized Excitations of Relativistic Extended Elementary-Particles
2. 1985 Solution of the Basic Problems of Electrodynamics in the Group-Space Formulation
3. 1988 Classical and Quantum Epr-Spin Correlations in the Triplet-State
4. 1995 Semiclassical Quantization of the Magnetic Top
5. 1995 the Critical Turning-Points in the Solutions of the Magnetic-Top Equations of Motion

In International Journal of Modern Physics A

1. 1990 Stability of the Static Solitons in a Pure Spinor Theory with Fractional Power Nonlinearities
2. 1991 Polarization Asymmetries in Fermion-(Anti)Fermion Scatterings with Dirac, Pauli, Scalar, Tensor and Axial Coupling Factors
3. 1993 Spinors, the Dirac Formalism and Correct Complex Conjugation
4. 1993 Helicity Amplitudes for Colliding Beam Scattering of 2 Spin 1/2 Particles

In International Journal of Theoretical Physics

1. 1983 Elementary Particle States Based on the Clifford Algebra-C7
2. 1993 Derivation of Quantum Maxwell Equations from Relativistic Particle Hamiltonian
3. 1995 Models of Particle States

In Proceedings of the Royal Society of London A

1. 1965 on Non-Compact Groups. I. Classification of Non-Compact Real Simple Lie Groups
2. 1965 A O Barut on Non-Compact Groups. Ii. Representations of the 2 + 1 Lorentz Group
3. 1966 Two Examples of Covariant Theories with Internal Symmetries Involving Spin
4. 1973 Introduction of Internal Coordinates into the Infinite-Component Majorana Equation

In International Journal of Modern Physics D

1. 1995 Dirac-Equation in Spatially Nonflat Robertson-Walker Space-Times .2.

In Communications in Mathematical Physics

1. 1968 Matrix Elements of Representations of Non-Compact Groups in a Continuous Basis
2. 1971 New Coherent States Associated with Non-Compact Groups

In Canadian Journal of Physics

1. 1973 Conformally Invariant Spinor Field Equation
2. 1989 on the Wave-Particle-Like Solutions of Nonlinear Equations

In Annalen der Physik

1. 1986 Unification Based on Electromagnetism - A Simple Composite Model of Particles
2. 1988 Schrödinger Interpretation of Psi As a Continuous Charge-Distribution

In Society for Industrial and Applied Mathematics

1. 1973 Some Unusual Applications of Lie Algebra Representations in Quantum Theory
