= Jimo (disambiguation) =

Jimo or JIMO may refer to:

- Jimo District, Qingdao, Shandong, China
- Joint Institute for Marine Observations
- Journal of Industrial and Management Optimization, an international journal
- Jupiter Icy Moons Orbiter, a formerly proposed NASA probe to Jupiter and Europa
- Journal of the International Meteor Organization
