= Ars combinatoria =

Ars Combinatoria (combinatorial art) may refer to:

- A logical method described by Gottfried Leibniz in his De Arte Combinatoria and attributed to Ramon Llull
- Ars Combinatoria (journal), a Canadian mathematical journal
- Ars Combinatoria (1980) by Francisco Guerrero (composer)
- Ars Combinatoria for Small Orchestra (1981) by composer Milton Babbitt
- Musikalisches Würfelspiel, a system for using dice to 'generate' music from precomposed options
