= HMJ =

HMJ can refer to:

- Gejia language, spoken in China
- Hiroshima Mathematical Journal
- Ho Mann Jahaan, a Pakistani film
- Khmelnytskyi Airport in Ukraine
