= Marianna Csörnyei =

Hungarian mathematician

Marianna Csörnyei (born October 8, 1975, in Budapest) is a Hungarian mathematician who works as a professor at the University of Chicago. She does research in real analysis, geometric measure theory, and geometric nonlinear functional analysis. She proved the equivalence of the zero measure notions of infinite dimensional Banach spaces.

== Education and career ==
Csörnyei received her doctorate from Eötvös Loránd University in 1999, supervised by György Petruska. She was a professor at the Mathematics Department of University College London between 1999 and 2011, and spent the 2009–2010 academic year at Yale University as visiting professor. Currently, she is at the University of Chicago.

She is contributing editor of the mathematical journal Real Analysis Exchange.

== Awards and honors ==
Csörnyei won a 2002 Whitehead Prize from the London Mathematical Society and a Royal Society Wolfson Research Merit Award that same year. She was also awarded the Philip Leverhulme Prize for Mathematics and Statistics in 2008 for her work in geometric measure theory.

She won a gold medal in the International Mathematics Olympiad.

She was an invited sectional speaker at the International Congress of Mathematicians in 2010.

Csörnyei was selected to deliver the AWM-AMS Noether Lecture at the 2022 Joint Mathematics Meetings in Seattle, Washington. The title of her talk is The Kakeya needle problem for rectifiable sets.

She is included in a deck of playing cards featuring notable women mathematicians published by the Association of Women in Mathematics.
