= Acta Mathematica (disambiguation) =

Acta Mathematica may refer to several publications:

- Acta Mathematica, published by the Royal Swedish Academy
- Acta Mathematica Academiae Paedagogicae Nyíregyháziensis, published by the University of Nyíregyháza
- Acta Mathematica Hungarica, published by Akadémiai Kiadó and Springer for the Hungarian Academy of Sciences
- Acta Mathematica Scientia, published by Elsevier
- Acta Mathematica Sinica, published by Springer
- Acta Mathematica Universitatis Comenianae published by the Comenius University
- Acta Mathematica Universitatis Ostraviensis published by the University of Ostrava
- Acta Mathematica Vietnamica, published by Springer
- Acta Mathematicae Applicatae Sinica, published by Springer
