= IJB =

IJB may refer to:

- International Journal of Biomathematics
- International Journal of Biometeorology
- International Journal of Biosciences
