= David Preiss =

David Preiss FRS (born 21 January 1947) is a Czech and British mathematician, specializing in mathematical analysis. He is a professor of mathematics at the University of Warwick

Preiss is a recipient of the Ostrowski Prize (2011) and the winner of the 2008 London Mathematical Society Pólya Prize for his 1987 result on Geometry of Measures, where he solved the remaining problem in the geometric theoretic structure of sets and measures in Euclidean space. He was an invited speaker at the ICM 1990 in Kyoto. He is a Fellow of the Royal Society (2004) and a Foreign Fellow of the Learned Society of the Czech Republic (2003). He is a laureate of the 2021 Neuron Award for lifelong contribution to science.

He is associate editor of the mathematical journal Real Analysis Exchange.

== Publications ==
- Erdős, Paul; Preiss, David (1976). "Decomposition of Spheres in Hilbert Spaces". Commentationes Mathematicae Universitatis Carolinae. 017 (4): 791–795.
- Preiss, David (1987). "Geometry of measures in R^n: Distribution, rectifiability, and densities". The Annals of Mathematics. 125 (3): 537–643. doi:10.2307/1971410. hdl:10338.dmlcz/133417. JSTOR 1971410.
