= HOSVD-based canonical form of TP functions and qLPV models =

Baranyi and Yam proposed the concept of M-mode SVD/HOSVD-based canonical form of TP functions and quasi-LPV system models. Szeidl et al. proved that the TP model transformation is capable of numerically reconstructing this canonical form.

Baranyi and Yam employed the ideas described by De Lathauwer etal and the algorithm developed by Vasilescu and Terzopoulos under the name M-mode SVD. The M-mode SVD is referred in the literature as either the Tucker or the HOSVD. The Tucker algorithm and the DeLathauwer etal. companion algorithm are sequential algorithm that employ gradient descent or the power method, respectively.

Related definitions (on TP functions, finite element TP functions, and TP models) can be found here. Details on the control theoretical background (i.e., the TP type polytopic Linear Parameter-Varying state-space model) can be found here.

A free MATLAB implementation of the TP model transformation can be downloaded at or at MATLAB Central .

== Existence of the M-mode SVD/HOSVD canonical form ==
Assume a given finite element TP function:

$$f(\mathbf{x})=\mathcal{S}\boxtimes_{n=1}^N \mathbf{w}_n(x_n),$$

where $\mathbf{x}\in \Omega \subset R^N$. Assume that, the weighting functions in $\mathbf{w}_n(x_n)$ are othonormal (or we transform to) for $n=1,\ldots, N$. Then, the execution of the HOSVD on the core tensor $\mathcal{S}$ leads to:

$$\mathcal{S}=\mathcal{A}\boxtimes_{n=1}^N \mathbf{U}_n.$$

Then,

$$f(\mathbf{x})=\mathcal{S}\boxtimes_{n=1}^N \mathbf{w}_n(x_n) = \left(\mathcal{A}\boxtimes_{n=1}^N \mathbf{U}_n\right) \boxtimes_{n=1}^N \mathbf{w}_n(x_n),$$

that is:

$$f(\mathbf{x})=\mathcal{A}\boxtimes_{n=1}^N \left( \mathbf{w}_n(x_n) \mathbf{U}_n\right) = \mathcal{A}\boxtimes_{n=1}^N \mathbf{w'}_n(x_n),$$

where weighting functions of $\mathbf{w'}_n(x_n),$ are orthonormed (as both the $\mathbf{w}_n(x_n)$ and $\mathbf{U}_n$ where orthonormed) and core tensor $\mathcal{A}$ contains the higher-order singular values.

== Definition ==
HOSVD (M-moe SVD) canonical form of TP function

$$f(\mathbf{x})=\mathcal{A}\boxtimes_{n=1}^N \mathbf{w}_n(x_n),$$

- Singular functions of $f(\mathbf{x})$: The weighting functions $w_{n,i_n}(x_n)$, $i_n=1,\ldots,r_n$ (termed as the $i_n$-th singular function on the $n$-th dimension, $n=1,\ldots,N$) in vector $\mathbf{w}_n(x_n)$ form an orthonormal set:

$$\forall n:\int_{a_{n}}^{b_{n}}\tilde{w}_{n,i}(p_{n})\tilde{w}_{n,j}(p_{n}) \, dp_n=\delta_{i,j},\quad1\leq i,j\leq I_n,$$

where $\delta_{i,j}$ is the Kronecker delta function ($\delta_{ij}=1$, if $i=j$ and $\delta_{ij}=0$, if $i\neq j$).

- The subtensors ${\mathcal{A}}_{i_n = i}$ have the properties of
  - all-orthogonality: two sub tensors ${\mathcal{A}}_{i_{n}=i}$ and ${\mathcal{A}}_{i_{n}=j}$ are orthogonal for all possible values of $n,i$ and $j:\left\langle {\mathcal{A}}_{i_{n}=i},{\mathcal{A}}_{i_{n}=j}\right\rangle =0$ when $i\neq j$,

&* ordering: $\left\| {\mathcal{A}}_{i_n=1}\right\| \geq\left\| {\mathcal{A}}_{i_n=2}\right\| \geq\cdots\geq\left\| {\mathcal{A}}_{i_n=r_n}\right\| >0$ for all possible values of $n=1,\ldots,N+2$.

- $n$-mode singular values of $f(\mathbf{x})$: The Frobenius-norm $\left\| {\mathcal{A}}_{i_n=i}\right\|$, symbolized by $\sigma_i^{(n)}$, are $n$-mode singular values of $\mathcal{A}$ and, hence, the given TP function.
- ${\mathcal{A}}$ is termed core tensor.
- The $n$-mode rank of $f(\mathbf{x})$: The rank in dimension $n$ denoted by $rank_n(f(\mathbf{x}))$ equals the number of non-zero singular values in dimension $n$.
