= Bulletin of Mathematical Sciences =

- Discipline: Mathematics
- Language: English
- Edited by: Efim Zelmanov, S.K. Jain, Ahmed Alsaedi

Publication details
- History: 2011–present
- Publisher: World Scientific, with the support of the King Abdulaziz University
- Frequency: Triannual
- Open access: Yes
- License: CC BY
- Impact factor: 1.485 (2021)

Standard abbreviations
- ISO 4: Bull. Math. Sci.

Indexing
- ISSN: 1664-3607 (print); 1664-3615 (web)
- LCCN: 2014256008
- OCLC no.: 741251536

Links
- Journal homepage; Online access; Online archive (2019–present); Online archive (2011–2018)

The Bulletin of Mathematical Sciences is a triannual peer-reviewed scientific journal of mathematics published by World Scientific as a diamond open access journal with article processing charges covered by King Abdulaziz University. The journal publishes expository papers, mostly invited, in all areas of mathematics, as well as short papers with original research. The journal's editors-in-chief are Efim Zelmanov (University of California, San Diego), S.K. Jain (King Abdulaziz University), and Ahmed Alsaedi (King Abdulaziz University). The journal was established in 2011.

The journal should not be confused with the Bulletin des Sciences Mathématiques (Bull. Sci. Math, 1870 – present).

== Abstracting and indexing ==
The journal is abstracted and indexed in MathSciNet, ZbMATH Open, Current Contents/Physical, Chemical & Earth Sciences, and the Science Citation Index Expanded. According to the Journal Citation Reports, the journal has a 2021 impact factor of 1.485. For 2016 the journal's Mathematical citation quotient (MSQ) from MathSciNet was 0.97.
