= Homology, Homotopy and Applications =

- Discipline: Algebraic topology
- Language: English
- Edited by: Gunnar Carlsson

Publication details
- History: 1999–present
- Publisher: International Press
- Frequency: Biannually
- Open access: Delayed 4 years
- Impact factor: 0.549 (2011)

Standard abbreviations
- ISO 4: Homol. Homotopy Appl.
- MathSciNet: Homology Homotopy Appl.

Indexing
- ISSN: 1532-0073 (print); 1532-0081 (web)
- OCLC no.: 473864575

Links
- Journal homepage; Online access

Homology, Homotopy and Applications is a peer-reviewed delayed open access mathematics journal published by International Press. It was established in 1999 and covers research on algebraic topology. The journal "Homology, Homotopy and Applications" has been founded in 1998 by Hvedri Inassaridze, Head of the Algebra Department of A. Razmadze Mathematical Institute of the Georgian Academy of Sciences, Professor of Tbilisi State University, Georgia. The journal is indexed by Mathematical Reviews and Zentralblatt MATH. Its 2011 MCQ was 0.55, and according to the Journal Citation Reports, the journal had a 2015 impact factor of 0.486, with a 5-year impact factor for that year of 0.654.

Formerly completely open access, the journal has switched to a delayed open access model. Volume are made open access 4 years after their issue year. International Press says it "reserves the right to change its online access policy at any time."
