= Analysis and Applications =

- Discipline: Mathematics
- Language: English
- Edited by: Philippe G. Ciarlet, Robert M. Miura, Roderick S.C. Wong

Publication details
- History: 2003–present
- Publisher: World Scientific (Singapore)

Standard abbreviations
- ISO 4: Anal. Appl.
- MathSciNet: Anal. Appl. (Singap.)

Indexing
- ISSN: 0219-5305 (print); 1793-6861 (web)

Links
- Journal homepage

Analysis and Applications is a journal covering mathematical analysis and its application to the physical and biological sciences and engineering. It was first published in 2003 by World Scientific. The journal aims "to encourage the development of new techniques and results in applied analysis".

== Abstracting and indexing ==
The journal is abstracted and indexed in:

- Zentralblatt MATH
- Mathematical Reviews
- Science Citation Index Expanded
- Current Contents/Physical, Chemical and Earth Sciences
- Journal Citation Reports/Science Edition
- Inspec
