= Taiwanese Journal of Mathematics =

- Discipline: Mathematics
- Language: English
- Edited by: Jenn-Nan Wang

Publication details
- Former name: Chinese Journal of Mathematics
- History: 1973–present
- Publisher: Mathematical Society of the Republic of China (Taiwan)
- Frequency: Bimonthly
- Impact factor: 1.136 (2020)

Standard abbreviations
- ISO 4: Taiwan. J. Math.
- MathSciNet: Taiwanese J. Math.

Indexing
- ISSN: 1027-5487 (print); 2224-6851 (web)
- LCCN: 97646014

Links
- Journal homepage

Taiwanese Journal of Mathematics is a peer-reviewed mathematics journal published by Mathematical Society of the Republic of China (Taiwan). Established in 1973 as the Chinese Journal of Mathematics, the journal was renamed to its current name in 1997. It is indexed by Mathematical Reviews and Zentralblatt MATH. Its 2017 impact factor was 0.718.
