= Journal of Mechanics of Materials and Structures =

- Discipline: Biological engineering, solid mechanics
- Language: English

Publication details
- History: 2006–present
- Publisher: Mathematical Sciences Publishers
- Frequency: 5/year
- Impact factor: 0.987 (2020)

Standard abbreviations
- ISO 4: J. Mech. Mater. Struct.

Indexing
- ISSN: 1559-3959 (print); 2157-5428 (web)
- LCCN: 2006212006
- OCLC no.: 928794289

Links
- Journal homepage

The Journal of Mechanics of Materials and Structures is a peer-reviewed scientific journal covering research on the mechanics of materials and deformable structures of all types. It was established by Charles R. Steele, who was also the first editor-in-chief.

== History ==
The journal was established in 2006 after 21 of the 23 members of the editorial board of the International Journal of Solids and Structures resigned in protest of Elsevier's "pressure for increased profits out of the limited institutional resources." In their founding issue, the editors of the new journal indicated several desires for the publication, including, "a low subscription price that will not grow faster than the number of pages and indeed may drop as the subscriber base expands."

== Abstracting and indexing ==
The journal is abstracted and indexed in Current Contents/Engineering, Computing & Technology, Ei Compendex, Science Citation Index Expanded, and Scopus. According to the Journal Citation Reports, the journal has a 2020 impact factor of 0.987.
