= Expositiones Mathematicae =

- Discipline: Mathematics
- Language: English
- Edited by: Liming Ge

Publication details
- History: 1983–present
- Publisher: Elsevier
- Frequency: Bimonthly
- Impact factor: 0.9 (2024)

Standard abbreviations
- ISO 4: Expo. Math.

Indexing
- ISSN: 0723-0869

Links
- Journal homepage

Expositiones Mathematicae is a peer-reviewed mathematical journal. The journal was established in 1983. It has been published by Elsevier since 2001. It is published 6 times a year and is edited by Liming Ge.

== Abstracting and indexing ==
The journal is abstracted and indexed in the following bibliographic databases:

- Science Citation Index Expanded
- Scopus
- MathSciNet
- zbMATH
