= Opuscula Mathematica =

- Discipline: Mathematics
- Language: English
- Edited by: Vicenţiu D. Rădulescu (Editor-in-Chief), Marek Galewski (Deputy Editor-in-Chief), Witold Majdak (Managing Editor)

Publication details
- History: 1937—present
- Publisher: Wydawnictwa AGH (AGH University Press) (Poland)
- Frequency: Bimonthly
- Open access: Yes
- License: Creative Commons CC-BY 4.0
- Impact factor: 2.2 (2025)

Standard abbreviations
- ISO 4: Opusc. Math.
- MathSciNet: Opuscula Math.

Indexing
- ISSN: 1232-9274 (print); 2300-6919 (web)

Links
- Journal homepage

Opuscula Mathematica is a mathematical research journal founded in 1937 in Kraków, Poland, by Professor Antoni Hoborski, an outstanding mathematician, the first Rector Magnificus of the Mining Academy (currently AGH University of Kraków), a co-establisher of the Polish Mathematical Society.

Opuscula Mathematica is indexed in several key databases, including Emerging Sources Citation Index by Clarivate Analytics (formerly Thomson Reuters), Scopus, MathSciNet (Mathematical Reviews), Zentralblatt MATH (zbMATH), and Directory of Open Access Journals (DOAJ).

== Focus ==
Opuscula Mathematica publishes original research articles in the field of:

- Discrete Mathematics,
- Functional Analysis,
- Operator Theory,
- Differential and Difference Equations
- Harmonic Analysis,
- Nonlinear Analysis,

and other areas of Applied Mathematics.
