= Andrzej Jamiołkowski =

Polish physicist

Andrzej Edmund Jamiołkowski
- Born: March 22, 1946 (age 80); Toruń, Poland
- Citizenship: Poland
- Education: University of Warsaw
- Known for: Choi–Jamiołkowski isomorphism
- Awards: Order of Polonia Restituta (1999); Convallaria Copernicana (2014)
- Scientific career
- Fields: statistical and mathematical physics
- Workplaces: Nicolaus Copernicus University

Andrzej Edmund Jamiołkowski (born March 22, 1946 in Toruń) is a Polish theoretical physicist, rector of the Nicolaus Copernicus University in Toruń (in the years 1993–1999 and 2005–2008). He is known for the Choi–Jamiołkowski isomorphism in quantum information theory.

== Biography ==
Jamiołkowski graduated from the Faculty of Physics at the University of Warsaw in 1969. After graduation, he began research work at the Nicolaus Copernicus University in Toruń, where in 1973 he obtained a doctoral degree, and in 1982 a postdoctoral degree. In 1990, he was appointed Professor. In the 1960s, he spent over four years on foreign scholarships, including in Munich, Oldenburg and Marburg.

Jamiołkowski held many important functions at the Nicolaus Copernicus University: in the years 1985–1986 he was the deputy director of the Institute of Physics, and then in the years 1986–1993 the Vice-Rector of the Nicolaus Copernicus University for science and cooperation with foreign countries. From 1993 to 1999, he was the rector of the Nicolaus Copernicus University. In the years 1999–2001, he was the vice-chairman of the Central Council of Higher Education in Poland. Until 2005, he was the chairman of the Polish Accreditation Committee. In March 2005, he was re-elected the rector of the Nicolaus Copernicus University in Toruń, replacing professor Jan Kopcewicz in this position. He held the position of rector until August 31, 2008, when he was replaced by Andrzej Radzimiński.

He was the chairman of the association of former scholarship holders of the Alexander von Humboldt Foundation. In 1992, Jamiołkowski became the editor-in-chief of the journal Reports on Mathematical Physics. He is the author or co-author of several dozen articles, several monographs and textbooks in the field of theoretical physics.

Andrzej Jamiołkowski was decorated with the Knight's Cross of the Order of Polonia Restituta in 1999. He was also awarded the distinction Convallaria Copernicana in 2014.
