= Journal of Algebra and Its Applications =

- Discipline: Mathematics
- Language: English
- Edited by: S.K. Jain, Sergio R. López-Permouth

Publication details
- History: 2008
- Publisher: World Scientific (United States)
- Impact factor: 0.569 (2018)

Standard abbreviations
- ISO 4: J. Algebra Its Appl.
- MathSciNet: J. Algebra Appl.

Indexing
- ISSN: 0219-4988 (print); 1793-6829 (web)

Links
- Journal homepage

The Journal of Algebra and Its Applications covers both theoretical and applied algebra, with a focus on practical applications. It is published by World Scientific.

According to the Journal Citation Reports, the journal has a 2020 impact factor of 0.736.

== Abstracting and indexing ==
The journal is abstracted and indexed in:

- Mathematical Reviews
- Zentralblatt MATH
- Science Citation Index Expanded
- Current Contents/Physical Chemical and Earth Sciences
- Journal Citation Reports/Science Edition
- INSPEC
