= Theory of Probability and Its Applications =

- Discipline: Probability, statistics
- Language: English
- Edited by: A. N. Shiryaev

Publication details
- History: 1956–present
- Publisher: Society for Industrial and Applied Mathematics
- Frequency: Quarterly
- Impact factor: 0.520 (2014)

Standard abbreviations
- ISO 4: Theory Probab. Its Appl.
- MathSciNet: Theory Probab. Appl.

Indexing
- CODEN: TPRBAU
- ISSN: 0040-585X (print); 1095-7219 (web)
- LCCN: 61047747
- OCLC no.: 915580252

Links
- Journal homepage; Online access

Theory of Probability and Its Applications is a quarterly peer-reviewed scientific journal published by the Society for Industrial and Applied Mathematics. It was established in 1956 by Andrey Nikolaevich Kolmogorov and is a translation of the Russian journal Teoriya Veroyatnostei i ee Primeneniya. It is abstracted and indexed by Mathematical Reviews and Zentralblatt MATH. Its 2014 MCQ was 0.12. According to the Journal Citation Reports, the journal has a 2014 impact factor of 0.520.
