= Illinois Journal of Mathematics =

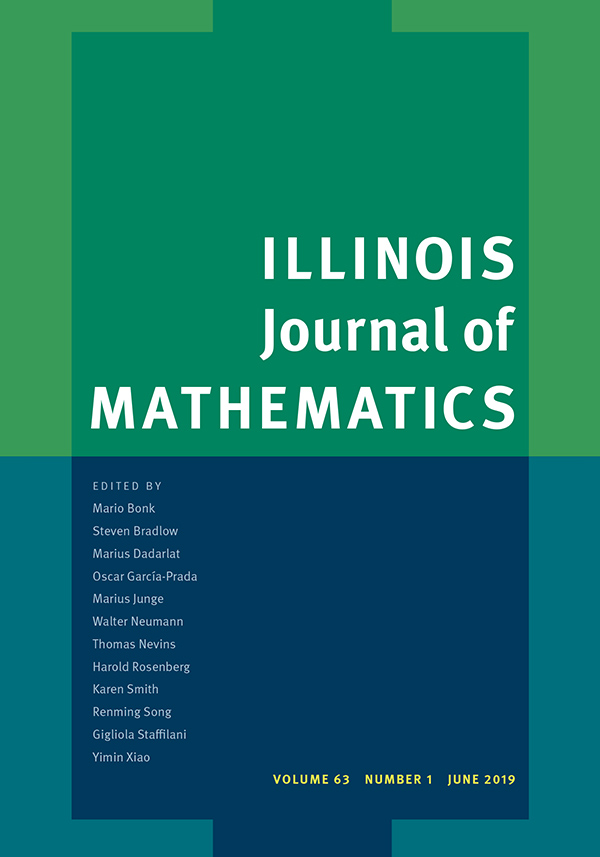
- Discipline: Mathematics
- Language: English
- Edited by: Steve Bradlow

Publication details
- History: 1957–present
- Publisher: Duke University Press, on behalf of the Department of Mathematics, University of Illinois at Urbana–Champaign
- Frequency: Quarterly
- Open access: Delayed, after 5 years

Standard abbreviations
- ISO 4: Ill. J. Math.
- MathSciNet: Illinois J. Math.

Indexing
- CODEN: IJMTAW
- ISSN: 0019-2082 (print); 1945-6581 (web)
- LCCN: 59037545
- OCLC no.: 947073278

Links
- Journal homepage; Online access at Project Euclid; Online archive; Journal page at publisher's website

The Illinois Journal of Mathematics is a quarterly peer-reviewed scientific journal of mathematics published by Duke University Press on behalf of the University of Illinois. It was established in 1957 by Reinhold Baer, Joseph L. Doob, Abraham Taub, George W. Whitehead, and Oscar Zariski.

The journal published the proof of the four color theorem by Kenneth Appel and Wolfgang Haken, which featured a then-unusual tabulation of computer-generated cases.

== Abstracting and indexing ==
The journal is indexed and abstracted in:

- MathSciNet
- Scopus
- zbMATH
