= International Journal of Mathematics =

- Discipline: Mathematics
- Language: English
- Edited by: Yasuyuki Kawahigashi

Publication details
- History: 1990-present
- Publisher: World Scientific (Singapore)
- Frequency: 10/year

Standard abbreviations
- ISO 4: Int. J. Math.
- MathSciNet: Internat. J. Math.

Indexing
- ISSN: 0129-167X (print); 1793-6519 (web)

Links
- Journal homepage

The International Journal of Mathematics was founded in 1990 and is published monthly (with the exception of June and December) by World Scientific. The journal covers mathematics in general.

According to the Journal Citation Reports, the journal has a 2020 impact factor of 0.688.

== Abstracting and indexing ==
The journal is abstracted and indexed in:

- Science Citation Index
- ISI Alerting Services
- CompuMath Citation Index
- Current Contents/Physical, Chemical & Earth Sciences
- Zentralblatt MATH
- Mathematical Reviews
- CSA Aerospace Sciences Abstracts
