= International Mathematics Research Surveys =

- Discipline: Mathematics
- Language: English

Publication details
- History: 2005–2008
- Publisher: Oxford University Press (United Kingdom)

Standard abbreviations
- ISO 4: Int. Math. Res. Surv.
- MathSciNet: IMRS Int. Math. Res. Surv.

Indexing
- ISSN: 1687-1308 (print); 1687-1324 (web)

Links
- Journal homepage

International Mathematics Research Surveys was a peer reviewed academic journal of mathematics. It published surveys of the state of research in different aspects of mathematics, identifying trends and open problems. It was published by Oxford University Press from 2005 until 2008.

The last editor was Morris Weisfeld of Duke University.
