= International Journal of Theoretical Physics =

- Discipline: Physics
- Language: English
- Edited by: Heinrich Saller

Publication details
- History: 1968–present
- Publisher: Springer Science+Business Media
- Frequency: Monthly
- Impact factor: 1.708 (2020)

Standard abbreviations
- ISO 4: Int. J. Theor. Phys.
- MathSciNet: Internat. J. Theoret. Phys.

Indexing
- ISSN: 0020-7748 (print); 1572-9575 (web)

Links
- Journal homepage

The International Journal of Theoretical Physics is a peer-reviewed scientific journal of physics published by Springer Science+Business Media since 1968. According to the Journal Citation Reports, the journal has a June 2023 real-time impact factor of 4.6 and publishes both original research and review articles. The editor-in-chief is Andreas Wipf (University of Jena).

== Scope and indexing ==
The journal covers the following areas: general relativity, quantum theory with relativistic quantum field theory, quantum measurement theory, quantum geometry and quantum logic. Services abstracting and indexing this journal include Chemical Abstracts Service, Mathematical Reviews, Science Citation Index, Scopus, and Zentralblatt MATH.
