= Deletionpedia =

Wiki containing deleted Wikipedia articles

- Logo of the original Deletionpedia
- Website type: Archive wiki
- Available in: Dutch, English, French, German, Swedish
- Commercial: Unknown
- Registration: None
- Launched: 2008 (v1); December 24, 2013 (v2)
- Current status: Inactive

Deletionpedia was an online archive wiki containing articles deleted from the English Wikipedia. Its version of each article included a header with more information about the deletion such as whether a speedy deletion occurred, where the deletion discussion about the article could be found, and which editor deleted the article. The original Deletionpedia operated from February to September 2008. The site was restarted under new management in December 2013.

The site was based on MediaWiki. It functioned as something of a "wikimorgue"; it automatically collected articles deleted from Wikipedia.

In addition to categories preserved from Wikipedia, Deletionpedia had its own categories for articles, based upon the deletion criteria. Pages were organized by the month in which they were deleted, by the number of editors that had worked on a page and by the length of time the article had existed on Wikipedia.

Information on the site stated site editors avoided hosting deleted pages that were copyright violations, pages with serious libel problems, pages the full revision history of which was still available on Wikipedia's sister sites, and pages which were set out to offend others.

Articles preserved by Deletionpedia were deleted from Wikipedia for a variety of reasons, from "being not notable" to "manipulation by political and business interests". The site did not seek donations; its "donate" page formerly suggested that supporters donate to mySociety or to the Wikimedia Foundation instead.

== Version 1 ==
The original Deletionpedia collected about 63,000 articles, which were deleted from Wikipedia from February to September 2008. Nearly 2,000 of the pages were more than 1,000 days old before they were deleted.

=== Discontinuation ===
The last viewable log the site made of Wikipedia was taken on 14 June 2012 of Anime Festival Wichita.

As of 2019 the original content was still available to view online. In 2011, Jason Scott's Archive Team saved a copy of the website with WikiTeam tools and uploaded the copy to the Internet Archive's collection.

=== Reception ===
The Wall Street Journal cited it as a response to the culture clash that exists on Wikipedia between deletionists and inclusionists. The Industry Standard calls it "a [would-be] fine research project for sociology students to study what groupthink does when applied to a community-built compendium of knowledge". Shortly thereafter, the Industry Standard again turned its attention to Deletionpedia, reporting that deletion of the article in Wikipedia about Deletionpedia was itself under discussion, suggesting that the article was not being considered for deletion based on "insignificance of the site" but rather "due to perceived criticism of Wikipedia itself". Deletionpedia also made news at De Telegraaf, the website for the largest daily morning Dutch language newspaper, and The Inquirer, a British technology tabloid website.

The site was more fully explored by Ars Technica in an article that not only described aspects of the website but mentioned the controversy over deleting the Wikipedia article on Deletionpedia.

== Statistics and version 2 ==
The website was reregistered by a new owner, Kasper Souren, and operations began anew in December 2013. As of February 2022, it had amassed 91,250 content pages, and 117,902 pages in total, with 239,847 edits. It had also acquired 4,020 users. The site appears to have stopped functioning in February 2023.

== Similar projects ==
There are similar projects for other Wikipedia languages, for example PlusPedia in German, PrePedia in Polish, and Wikisage in Dutch.

== See also ==
- archive.today
- Rejecta Mathematica
- Reliability of Wikipedia
- Wayback Machine
- WebCite
