= Terry Friesz =

Terry L. Friesz is the first Harold and Inge Marcus Professor of Industrial Engineering at the Pennsylvania State University. He is responsible for developing the basic theory of dynamic user equilibrium, which is the class of dynamic games studied in transportation planning and logistics. As of 2019, he is the editor-in-chief of the journal Networks and Spatial Economics.

He obtained his PhD at Johns Hopkins University in 1977.
