= Ars Combinatoria (journal) =

- Discipline: Combinatorics
- Language: English

Publication details
- History: 1976–present
- Publisher: Charles Babbage Research Centre (Canada)
- Frequency: Quarterly

Standard abbreviations
- ISO 4: Ars Comb.
- MathSciNet: Ars Combin.

Indexing
- ISSN: 0381-7032

Links
- Journal homepage

Ars Combinatoria, a Canadian Journal of Combinatorics is an English language research journal in combinatorics, published by the Charles Babbage Research Centre, Winnipeg, Manitoba, Canada.

== History ==
From 1976 to 1988 it published two volumes per year, and subsequently it published as many as six volumes per year.

The journal is indexed in MathSciNet and Zentralblatt. As of 2019, SCImago Journal Rank listed it in the bottom quartile of miscellaneous mathematics journals.

As of December 15, 2021, the editorial board of the journal resigned, asking that inquiries be directed to the publisher. In 2024, Combinatorial Press announced that they had taken over publishing the journal. Under the new publisher, authors may opt for subscription-only publication at no fee, with a mandatory 2-year embargo period, or open access with a high open-access fee.
