= Asia-Pacific Journal of Operational Research =

- Discipline: Operations research, Mathematics
- Language: English

Publication details
- History: 2004–present
- Publisher: World Scientific (Singapore)
- Impact factor: 0.364 (2016)

Standard abbreviations
- ISO 4: Asia-Pac. J. Oper. Res.

Indexing
- ISSN: 0217-5959 (print); 1793-7019 (web)

Links
- Journal homepage

The Asia-Pacific Journal of Operational Research (APJOR) aims to provide a "forum for practitioners, academics and researchers in Operational Research and related fields, within and beyond the Asia-Pacific region". It is also the official journal of the Association of Asian-Pacific Operational Research Societies within IFORS (APORS)] and is published by World Scientific. It has an emphasis on papers of practical relevance to the field of Operational Research.

== Participating societies ==
- Australian Society for Operations Research
- Operations Research Society of China
- Hong Kong Operational Research Society
- Operational Research Society of India
- The Operations Research Society of Japan
- Korean Operations Research and Management Science Society
- Management Science/ Operations Research Society of Malaysia
- Operational Research Society of New Zealand (Inc.)
- Operations Research Society of the Philippines
- Operational Research Society of Singapore

== Abstracting and indexing ==
The journal is indexed in Mathematical Reviews, Science Citation Index Expanded, CompuMath Citation Index, Zentralblatt MATH, Compendex, and Inspec.
