= Soft computing =

Types of approximate algorithm

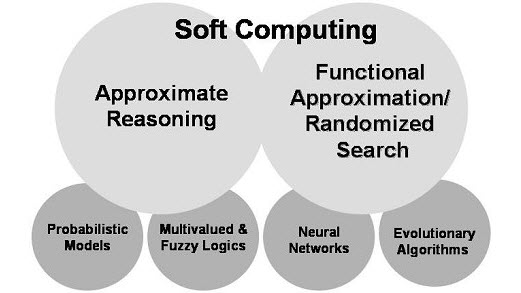
Soft Computing

Soft computing is an umbrella term used to describe types of algorithms that produce approximate solutions to unsolvable high-level problems in computer science. Typically, traditional hard-computing algorithms heavily rely on concrete data and mathematical models to produce solutions to problems. Soft computing was coined in the late 20th century. During this period, revolutionary research in three fields greatly impacted soft computing. Fuzzy logic is a computational paradigm that entertains the uncertainties in data by using levels of truth rather than rigid 0s and 1s in binary. Next, neural networks which are computational models influenced by human brain functions. Finally, evolutionary computation is a term to describe groups of algorithm that mimic natural processes such as evolution and natural selection.

In the context of artificial intelligence and machine learning, soft computing provides tools to handle real-world uncertainties. Its methods supplement preexisting methods for better solutions. Today, the combination with artificial intelligence has led to hybrid intelligence systems that merge various computational algorithms. Expanding the applications of artificial intelligence, soft computing leads to robust solutions. Key points include tackling ambiguity, flexible learning, grasping intricate data, real-world applications, and ethical artificial intelligence.

== History ==
The development of soft computing dates back to the late 20th century. In 1965, Lotfi Zadeh introduced fuzzy logic, which laid the mathematical groundwork for soft computing. Between the 1960s and 1970s, evolutionary computation, the development of genetic algorithms that mimicked biological processes, began to emerge. These models carved the path for models to start handling uncertainty. Although neural network research began in the 1940s and 1950s, there was a new demand for research in the 1980s. Researchers invested time to develop models for pattern recognition. Between the 1980s and 1990s, hybrid intelligence systems merged fuzzy logic, neural networks, and evolutionary computation that solved complicated problems quickly. From the 1990s to the present day, Models have been instrumental and affect multiple fields handling big data, including engineering, medicine, social sciences, and finance.

== Computational techniques ==
=== Fuzzy logic ===
Fuzzy logic is an aspect of computing that handles approximate reasoning. Typically, binary logic allows computers to make decisions on true or false reasons (0s and 1s); however, introducing fuzzy logic allows systems to handle the unknowns between 0 and 1.

Unlike classical sets that allow members to be entirely within or out, fuzzy sets allow partial membership by incorporating "graduation" between sets. Fuzzy logic operations include negation, conjunction, and disjunction, which handle membership between data sets.

Fuzzy rules are logical statements that map the correlation between input and output parameters. They set the rules needed to trace variable relationships linguistically, and they would not be possible without linguistic variables. Linguistic variables represent values typically not quantifiable, allowing uncertainties.

=== Neural networks ===
Neural networks are computational models that attempt to mimic the structure and functioning of the human brain. While computers typically use binary logic to solve problems, neural networks attempt to provide solutions for complicated problems by enabling systems to think human-like, which is essential to soft computing.

Neural networks revolve around perceptrons, which are artificial neurons structured in layers. Like the human brain, these interconnected nodes process information using complicated mathematical operations.

Through training, the network handles input and output data streams, and adjusts parameters according to the provided information. Neural networks help make soft computing flexible and capable of handling high-level problems.

In soft computing, neural networks aid in pattern recognition, predictive modeling, and data analysis. They are also used in image recognition, natural language processing, speech recognition, and systems.

=== Evolutionary computation ===
Evolutionary computation is a field in soft computing that uses the principles of natural selection and evolution to solve complicated problems. It promotes the discovery of diverse solutions within a solution space, encouraging near-perfect solutions. It finds satisfactory solutions by using computational models and types of evolutionary algorithms. Evolutionary computation consists of algorithms that mimic natural selection, such as genetic algorithms, genetic programming, evolution strategies and evolutionary programming. These algorithms use crossover, mutation, and selection.

Crossover, or recombination, exchanges data between nodes to diversify data and handle more outcomes. Mutation is a genetic technique that helps prevent the premature conclusion to a suboptimal solution by diversifying an entire range of solutions. It helps new optimal solutions in solution sets that help the overall optimization process. Selection is an operator that chooses which solution from a current population fits enough to transition to the next phase. These drive genetic programming to find optimal solutions by ensuring the survival of only the fittest solutions in a set.

In soft computing, evolutionary computation helps applications of data mining (using large sets of data to find patterns), robotics, optimizing, and engineering methods.

=== Hybrid intelligence systems ===
Hybrid intelligence systems combine the strengths of soft computing components to create integrated computational models. Artificial techniques such as fuzzy logic, neural networks, and evolutionary computation combine to solve problems efficiently. These systems improve judgment, troubleshooting, and data analysis. Hybrid intelligence systems help overcome the limitations of individual AI approaches to improve performance, accuracy, and adaptability to address dynamic problems. It advances soft computing capabilities in data analysis, pattern recognition, and systems.

== Applications ==
Due to their dynamic versatility, soft computing models are precious tools that confront complex real-world problems. They are applicable in numerous industries and research fields:

Soft computing fuzzy logic and neural networks help with pattern recognition, image processing, and computer vision. Its versatility is a major implement in natural language processing as it helps decipher human emotions and language. They also aid in data mining and predictive analysis by obtaining priceless insights from large datasets. Soft computing helps optimize solutions from energy, financial forecasts, environmental and biological data modeling, and anything that deals with or requires models.

Within the medical field, soft computing is revolutionizing disease detection, creating plans to treat patients and models of healthcare.

== Challenges and limitations ==
Soft computing methods such as neural networks and fuzzy models are complicated and may need clarification. Sometimes, it takes effort to understand the logic behind neural network algorithms' decisions, making it challenging for a user to adopt them. In addition, it takes valuable, costly resources to feed models extensive data sets, and sometimes it is impossible to acquire the computational resources necessary. There are also significant hardware limitations which limits the computational power.
