= Integral Transforms and Special Functions =

- Discipline: Mathematics
- Language: English
- Edited by: Semyon B. Yakubovich

Publication details
- History: 1993–present
- Publisher: Taylor & Francis
- Frequency: Monthly
- Impact factor: 1.0 (2024)

Standard abbreviations
- ISO 4: Integral Transforms Spec. Funct.

Indexing
- ISSN: 1065-2469 (print); 1476-8291 (web)
- LCCN: sn92000421
- OCLC no.: 26537827

Links
- Journal homepage; Online access; Online archive

Integral Transforms and Special Functions is a monthly peer-reviewed scientific journal published by Taylor & Francis. It was established by A. P. Prudnikov in 1993 and covers research in mathematical analysis and related areas, including harmonic analysis, real and complex analysis, functional analysis, the theory of differential and integral equations, approximation theory, convolution theory, orthogonal polynomials, optimisation and control, stochastic and diffusion processes, and other branches of pure and applied mathematics. The editor-in-chief is Semyon B. Yakubovich (University of Porto).
