= Joint Institute for Marine Observations =

US research institute

Coordinates: 32.70793°N 117.23892°W

The JIMO logo

The Joint Institute for Marine Observations (JIMO) is a research institute that is sponsored jointly by National Oceanic and Atmospheric Administration (NOAA)/Office of Oceanic and Atmospheric Research (OAR) and University of California's Scripps Institution of Oceanography. JIMO is located inside the Scripps campus.

The JIMO research themes are:

- Climate and Coastal Observations, Analysis, and Prediction Research
- Biological Systems Research
- Research in Extreme Environments
- Research & Development on Observation Systems
