= General Relativity and Gravitation =

- Discipline: Physics, astronomy
- Language: English
- Edited by: Pablo Laguna and Mairi Sakellariadou

Publication details
- History: 1970-present
- Publisher: Springer Science+Business Media
- Frequency: Monthly
- Impact factor: 3.0 (2025)

Standard abbreviations
- ISO 4: Gen. Relativ. Gravit.
- MathSciNet: Gen. Relativity Gravitation

Indexing
- ISSN: 0001-7701 (print); 1572-9532 (web)
- LCCN: 74645280
- OCLC no.: 1794406

Links
- Journal homepage

General Relativity and Gravitation is a monthly peer-reviewed scientific journal. It was established in 1970, and is published by Springer Science+Business Media under the auspices of the International Society on General Relativity and Gravitation. The two editors-in-chief are Pablo Laguna and Mairi Sakellariadou; former editors include George Francis Rayner Ellis, Hermann Nicolai, Abhay Ashtekar, and Roy Maartens. The journal's field of interest is modern gravitational physics, encompassing all theoretical and experimental aspects of general relativity and gravitation.

== Aims and scope ==
The aims of General Relativity and Gravitation include public outreach through teaching and public understanding, as well as disseminate the history of general relativity and gravitation. Another aim of the journal is to publish original research on numerous topics. Some of the topics of interest are observational, or theoretical work, in cosmology, general relativity, gravity, supergravity, quantum gravity, string theory (including extensions), relativity, and the related complex mathematics involved.

Publishing formats include original research papers, short communications, commentaries, review articles, and book reviews. The journal also includes mathematical topics related to the journal's science topics, along with mathematical results and techniques.

== Abstracting and indexing ==
General Relativity and Gravitation is abstracted and indexed in Academic OneFile, Academic Search, Astrophysics Data System, Compendex, ProQuest, Current Contents/Physical, Chemical and Earth Sciences, Digital Mathematics Registry, INIS Atomindex, Inspec, Mathematical Reviews, Science Citation Index, VINITI Database RAS, and Zentralblatt MATH.
