= Chinese Annals of Mathematics, Series B =

- Discipline: Mathematics
- Language: English
- Edited by: Tatsien Li

Publication details
- History: 1983–present
- Publisher: Springer
- Frequency: Bimonthly
- Impact factor: 0.756 (2020)

Standard abbreviations
- ISO 4: Chin. Ann. Math. Ser. B

Indexing
- ISSN: 0252-9599 (print); 1860-6261 (web)
- LCCN: 84641855
- OCLC no.: 9198455

Links
- Journal homepage; Online access

Chinese Annals of Mathematics, Series B is a peer-reviewed mathematics journal focusing on pure and applied mathematics published by Springer. The journal was founded in 1983 when it was split from Chinese Annals of Mathematics. It is indexed by Mathematical Reviews and Zentralblatt MATH. According to the Journal Citation Reports, the journal has a 2020 impact factor of 0.756.
