= AStA Advances in Statistical Analysis =

- Discipline: Statistical analysis
- Language: English
- Edited by: Harry Haupt and Yarema Okhrin

Publication details
- History: 2007–present
- Publisher: Springer Science+Business Media
- Frequency: Quarterly
- Impact factor: 1.6 (2025)

Standard abbreviations
- ISO 4: AStA Adv. Stat. Anal.

Indexing
- ISSN: 1863-8171 (print); 1863-818X (web)
- LCCN: 2008210100
- OCLC no.: 122298728

Links
- Journal homepage; Online access

AStA Advances in Statistical Analysis is a peer-reviewed mathematics journal published quarterly by Springer Science+Business Media and the German Statistical Society. It was established in 2007, and covers statistical theory, methods, methodological developments, as well as probability and mathematics applications. Coverage is organized into three broad areas: statistical applications, statistical methodology, and review articles. The editors were Göran Kauermann (2009–2019) and Stefan Lang (2009–2014). In 2022, the editors were Thomas Kneib and Yarema Okhrin. Current editors as of 2025 are Harry Haupt and Yarema Okhrin.

== Abstracting and indexing ==
The journal is abstracted and indexed in:

- Academic OneFile
- Current Index to Statistics
- Digital Mathematics Registry
- EconLit
- Expanded Academic
- International Bibliography of Periodical Literature
- Mathematical Reviews
- ProQuest
- Research Papers in Economics
- Science Citation Index Expanded
- Scopus
- Zentralblatt Math

According to the Journal Citation Reports, the journal has a 2025 impact factor of 1.6.
