= Mathematical Correspondent =

The Mathematical Correspondent was the first American "specialized scientific journal" and the first American mathematics journal, established in 1804, under the editorial guidance of George Baron. The journal published an essay by Robert Adrian which was the first to introduce Diophantine analysis in the United States. In 1807, Adrian, a main contributor to the journal, became editor for one year.
