= Hacettepe Journal of Mathematics and Statistics =

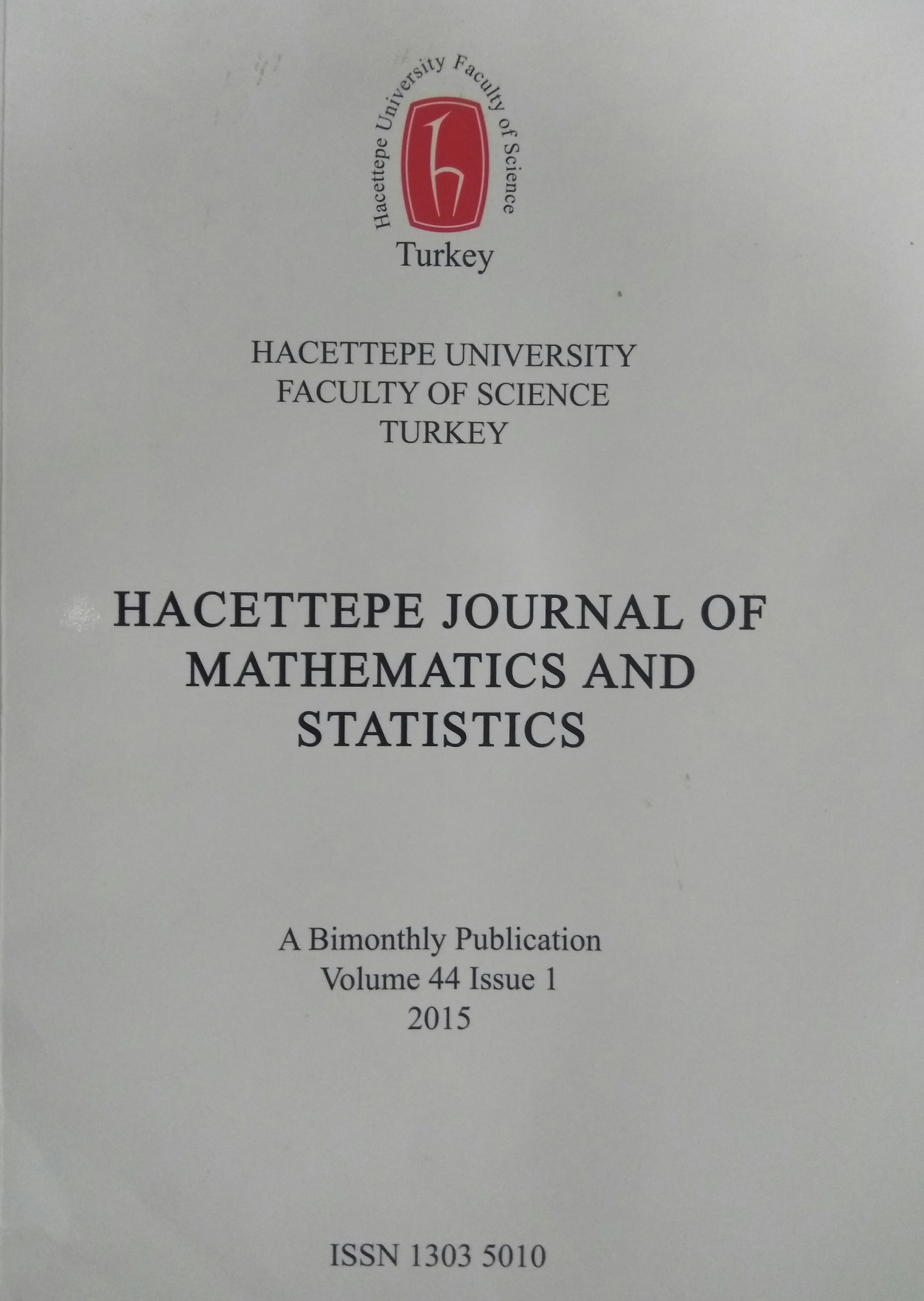
- Discipline: Mathematics and Statistics
- Language: English
- Edited by: Murat Diker (Mathematics) and Gamze Özel Kadılar (Statistics)

Publication details
- Former names: Hacettepe Bulletin of Natural Sciences and Engineering, Series B
- History: 2002-present
- Publisher: Hacettepe University (Turkey)
- Frequency: Bimonthly
- Open access: Yes
- Impact factor: 0.7 (2023)

Standard abbreviations
- ISO 4: Hacet. J. Math. Stat.

Indexing
- ISSN: 2651-477X
- OCLC no.: 61522964

Links
- Journal homepage

Hacettepe Journal of Mathematics and Statistics is an international peer-reviewed open-access journal (with no article processing/publishing charge) devoted to the publication of original research papers and occasional surveys of a suitably high standard, written in English, on all aspects of Mathematics and Statistics. The journal is published by Hacettepe University Faculty of Science. It is currently hosted on DergiPark.

== Abstracting and indexing ==
According to the Journal Citation Reports, the journal has a 2023 impact factor of 0.7 . The journal is indexed in SCI-EXP, Journal Citation Reports, Mathematical Reviews, Zentralblatt MATH, Current Index to Statistics, Statistical Theory & Method Abstracts, SCOPUS, Tübitak-Ulakbim.
