= Networks and Spatial Economics =

- Discipline: Economics
- Language: English
- Edited by: Terry L. Friesz

Publication details
- History: 2001–present
- Publisher: Springer Science+Business Media
- Frequency: Quarterly
- Impact factor: 2.379 (2019)

Standard abbreviations
- ISO 4: Netw. Spat. Econ.

Indexing
- ISSN: 1566-113X (print); 1572-9427 (web)
- OCLC no.: 223614057

Links
- Journal homepage; Online access

Networks and Spatial Economics (NETS) is an international academic journal devoted to the mathematical and numerical study of economic activities facilitated by human infrastructure, broadly defined to include technologies pertinent to information, telecommunications, the Internet, transportation, energy storage and transmission, and water resources. Because the spatial organization of infrastructure most generally takes the form of networks, the journal encourages submissions that employ a network perspective. However, non-network continuum models are also recognized as an important tradition that has provided great insight into spatial economic phenomena; consequently, the journal welcomes with equal enthusiasm submissions based on continuum models. The current Editor-in-Chief is Terry L. Friesz at the Pennsylvania State University.

== Abstracting and indexing ==
NETS is abstracted/indexed in ABI inform, CompuMath Citation Index, Current Contents/Engineering, Computing and Technology, Current Index to Statistics, EBSCO, ECONIS, Research Papers in Economics (RePEc), ISI Science Citation Index Expanded, SCOPUS, Zentralblatt Math. According to the Journal Citation Reports, the journal has a 2019 impact factor of 2.379, ranking it 31st out of 83 journals in the category "Operations Research & Management Science" and 19th out of 36 journals in the category "Transportation Science & Technology". The journal was indexed by ISI after only three years because of its consistent on-time publication record and because it has had since inception an editorial board that is unusually distinguished for a new journal. The editorial board consists of engineers, economists, geographers, applied mathematicians, computer scientists, game theorists, and physicists.

NETS mainly publishes contributed papers and occasional special issues.
