= Mathematics and Mechanics of Complex Systems =

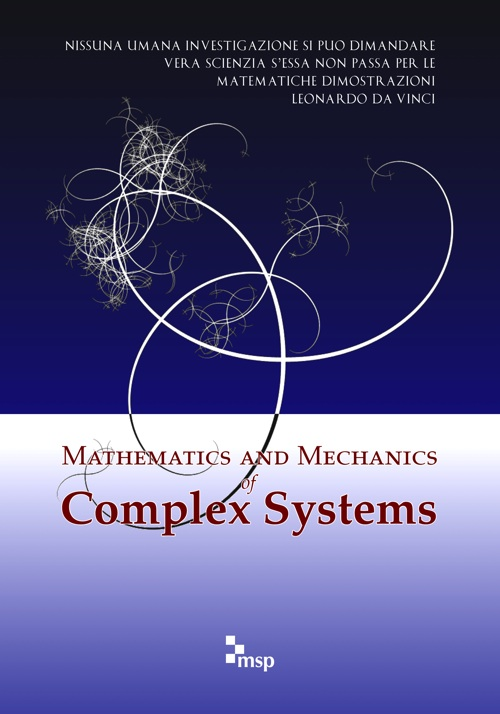
- Discipline: Mathematics, Physics, Engineering, Materials science, History of Science
- Language: English
- Edited by: Francesco dell'Isola, Gilles A. Francfort, Martin Ostoja-Starzewski

Publication details
- History: 2013–present
- Publisher: Mathematical Sciences Publishers (United States of America)
- Frequency: Quarterly
- Open access: No

Standard abbreviations
- ISO 4: Math. Mech. Complex Syst.

Indexing
- ISSN: 2326-7186 (print); 2325-3444 (web)

Links
- Journal homepage

Mathematics and Mechanics of Complex Systems (MEMOCS) is a quarterly peer-reviewed scientific journal founded by the International Research Center for the Mathematics and Mechanics of Complex Systems (M&MoCS) from Università degli Studi dell'Aquila, in Italy. It is published by Mathematical Sciences Publishers, and first issued in February 2013. The co-chairs of the editorial board are Francesco dell'Isola and Gilles Francfort, and chair managing editor is Martin Ostoja-Starzewski.

MEMOCS is indexed in Scopus, MathSciNet and Zentralblatt MATH.

It is open access, free of author charges (being supported by grants from academic institutions), and available in both printed and electronic forms.

== Contents ==
MEMOCS publishes articles from diverse scientific fields with a specific emphasis on mechanics. Its contents rely on the application or development of rigorous mathematical methods.

The journal also publishes original research in related areas of mathematics of well-established applicability, such as variational methods, numerical methods, and optimization techniques, as well as papers focusing on and clarifying particular aspects of the history of mathematics and science.
