= Journal of Hyperbolic Differential Equations =

- Discipline: Mathematics
- Language: English
- Edited by: Philippe G. LeFloch

Publication details
- History: 2004-present
- Publisher: World Scientific (Singapore)
- Impact factor: 0.940 (2016)

Standard abbreviations
- ISO 4: J. Hyperbolic Differ. Equ.

Indexing
- ISSN: 0219-8916 (print); 1793-6993 (web)

Links
- Journal homepage

The Journal of Hyperbolic Differential Equations was founded in 2004 and carries papers pertaining to nonlinear hyperbolic problems and related mathematical topics, specifically on the theory and numerical analysis of hyperbolic conservation laws and of hyperbolic partial differential equations arising in mathematical physics. This includes topics such as nonlinear hyperbolic systems in continuum physics (for example, hyperbolic models of fluid dynamics, mixed models of transonic flows). The journal is published by World Scientific.

== Abstracting and indexing ==
The journal is abstracted and indexed in:

- Mathematical Reviews
- Zentralblatt MATH
- Science Citation Index Expanded
- Current Contents/Physical, Chemical and Earth Sciences
- CompuMath Citation Index
- Journal Citation Reports/Science Edition
- ISI Alerting Services
- Inspec
