= Advances in Theoretical and Mathematical Physics =

- Discipline: Theoretical physics and mathematical physics
- Language: English
- Edited by: Lars Andersson, Michael R. Douglas, Rajesh Gopakumar, Anton Kapustin, Xiao-Gang Wen

Publication details
- History: 1997–present
- Publisher: International Press
- Frequency: Bimonthly

Standard abbreviations
- ISO 4: Adv. Theor. Math. Phys.

Indexing
- ISSN: 1095-0761 (print); 1095-0753 (web)
- LCCN: 98641576
- OCLC no.: 37471403

Links
- Journal homepage; Online access

Advances in Theoretical and Mathematical Physics (ATMP) is a peer-reviewed, mathematics journal, published by International Press. Established in 1997, the journal publishes articles on theoretical physics and mathematics.

The current managing editors are Charles Doran, Babak Haghighat, Junya Yagi and Hossein Yavartanoo.

== Abstracting, indexing, and reviews ==
This journal is indexed in the following databases:

- Science Citation Index Expanded
- MathSciNet – also reviews this journal
- Current Contents: Physical, Chemical & Earth Sciences
- Zentralblatt MATH
