= Mathematical Sciences Publishers =

Journal publisher

- Country of origin: United States
- Headquarters location: Berkeley, California
- Publication types: Academic journals, Books
- Official website: msp.org

Mathematical Sciences Publishers is a nonprofit publishing company run by and for mathematicians. It publishes several journals and the book series Geometry & Topology Monographs. It is run from a central office in the Department of Mathematics at the University of California, Berkeley.

== Journals owned and published ==
- Algebra & Number Theory
- Algebraic & Geometric Topology
- Analysis & PDE
- Annals of K-Theory
- Communications in Applied Mathematics and Computational Science
- Geometry & Topology
- Innovations in Incidence Geometry—Algebraic, Topological and Combinatorial
- Involve: A Journal of Mathematics
- Journal of Algebraic Statistics
- Journal of Mechanics of Materials and Structures
- Journal of Software for Algebra and Geometry
- Mathematics and Mechanics of Complex Systems
- Moscow Journal of Combinatorics and Number Theory
- Pacific Journal of Mathematics
- Probability and Mathematical Physics
- Pure and Applied Analysis
- Tunisian Journal of Mathematics

== Journals distributed ==
- Annals of Mathematics

== Online publications ==
Mathematical Sciences Publishers produces Celebratio Mathematica, a publicly supported online journal that honors mathematicians and their contributions. It provides a comprehensive collection of their works, including biographical information, bibliographic data, photographs, testimonials and commentary. The editorial board carefully selects mathematicians based on their scientific achievements and scholarly impact.

== Book series ==
- Open Book Series
- Geometry & Topology Monographs
