= Algebra & Number Theory =

- Discipline: Mathematics
- Language: English
- Edited by: Bjorn Poonen; David Eisenbud

Publication details
- History: 2007–present
- Publisher: Mathematical Sciences Publishers
- Frequency: 10/year

Standard abbreviations
- ISO 4: Algebra Number Theory

Indexing
- ISSN: 1937-0652

Links
- Journal homepage

Algebra & Number Theory is a peer-reviewed mathematics journal published by the nonprofit organization Mathematical Sciences Publishers. It was launched on January 17, 2007, with the goal of "providing an alternative to the current range of commercial specialty journals in algebra and number theory, an alternative of higher quality and much lower cost."

The journal publishes original research articles in algebra and number theory, interpreted broadly, including algebraic geometry and arithmetic geometry, for example. ANT publishes high-quality articles of interest to a broad readership, at a level surpassing all but the top four or five generalist mathematics journals. Currently, it is regarded as the best journal specializing in number theory. Issues are published both online and in print.

== Editorial board ==
The Managing Editor is Antoine Chambert-Loir of Paris Cité University, and the Editorial Board Chair is David Eisenbud of U. C. Berkeley.

== See also ==
- Jonathan Pila
