= Rejecta Mathematica =

- Discipline: mathematics
- Language: English
- Edited by: Michael Wakin, Christopher Rozell, Mark Davenport, Jason Laska

Standard abbreviations
- ISO 4: Rejecta Math.

Indexing
- ISSN: 1948-8351
- OCLC no.: 402335845

Links
- Journal homepage

Rejecta Mathematica was an online journal for publishing papers that had been rejected by other mathematics journals. Each paper was accompanied by an open letter describing why the paper was rejected, how the topic has been developed since and why it is worthy of publication. The first issue was published in July 2009 containing topics such as image enhancement and condition numbers. The quality of the contributions in the first issue was seen as mixed. The editors were Michael Wakin, Christopher Rozell, Mark Davenport and Jason Laska.

In June 2011, almost two years after the inaugural issue, the second issue was published; it contains topics such as subspace classification and distributions of pseudoprimes.

As of January 2018, the original website is no longer online, but an archival copy is hosted on GitHub.

A similar operating model is implemented by unconventional journals like Annals of Improbable Research, the Null Hypothesis: The Journal of Unlikely Science, the Journal of Irreproducible Results or, in different contexts, by Health Promotion International.

== See also ==
- Deletionpedia
