= LMS Journal of Computation and Mathematics =

Journal of Computation and Mathematics
- Discipline: Mathematics
- Language: English

Publication details
- History: 1998-2017
- Publisher: London Mathematical Society
- Open access: Hybrid

Standard abbreviations
- ISO 4: LMS J. Comput. Math.

Indexing
- ISSN: 1461-1570
- LCCN: 00252444
- OCLC no.: 66472555

Links
- Journal homepage; Online archive

LMS Journal of Computation and Mathematics was a peer-reviewed online mathematics journal covering computational aspects of mathematics published by the London Mathematical Society. The journal published its first article in 1998 and ceased operation in 2017. An open access archive of the journal is maintained by Cambridge University Press.

== Abstracting and indexing ==
The journal is abstracted and indexed in MathSciNet, Scopus, and Zentralblatt MATH.
