= Iranian Journal of Fuzzy Systems =

- Discipline: Computer Science
- Language: English
- Edited by: Mashaallah Mashinchi

Publication details
- History: 2004-present
- Publisher: University of Sistan and Baluchestan (Iran)
- Open access: Yes
- Impact factor: 1.056 (2011)

Standard abbreviations
- ISO 4: Iran. J. Fuzzy Syst.

Indexing
- ISSN: 1735-0654
- OCLC no.: 85763440

Links
- Journal homepage; Online access; Online archive

The Iranian Journal of Fuzzy Systems is a peer-reviewed scientific journal published by the University of Sistan and Baluchestan. It covers research on theory and applications of fuzzy sets and systems in the areas of foundations, pure mathematics, artificial intelligence, uncertainty modeling, and other related aspects.

== Abstracting and indexing ==
The Iranian Journal of Fuzzy Systems is abstracted and indexed in Scopus, Islamic World Science Citation Database, Science Citation Index Expanded, Mathematical Reviews, Zentralblatt MATH, and EBSCO databases. According to the Journal Citation Reports, the journal has a 2011 impact factor of 1.056.

== Controversy ==
The journal has faced criticism for the unexpectedly large impact factor it has.
