= International Journal of Algebra and Computation =

- Discipline: Algebra
- Language: English

Publication details
- History: 1991-present
- Publisher: World Scientific (Singapore)
- Impact factor: 0.396 (2016)

Standard abbreviations
- ISO 4: Int. J. Algebra Comput.
- MathSciNet: Internat. J. Algebra Comput.

Indexing
- ISSN: 0218-1967 (print); 1793-6500 (web)

Links
- Journal homepage

The International Journal of Algebra and Computation is published by World Scientific, and contains articles on general mathematics, as well as:

- Combinatorial group theory and semigroup theory
- Universal algebra
- Algorithmic and computational problems in algebra
- Theory of automata
- Formal language theory
- Theory of computation
- Theoretical computer science

According to the Journal Citation Reports, the journal has a 2020 impact factor of 0.719.

== Abstracting and indexing ==
The journal is indexed in:

- ISI Alerting Services
- CompuMath Citation Index
- Science Citation Index
- Current Contents/Physical, Chemical and Earth Sciences
- Mathematical Reviews
- INSPEC
- Zentralblatt MATH
- Computer Abstracts
