= Open Mathematics =

- Discipline: Mathematics
- Language: English
- Edited by: Salvatore Angelo Marano, Vincenzo Vespri

Publication details
- Former name: Central European Journal of Mathematics
- History: 2003-present
- Publisher: Walter de Gruyter
- Frequency: continuous publication
- Open access: Yes
- License: Creative Commons-BY
- Impact factor: 0.726 (2018)

Standard abbreviations
- ISO 4: Open Math.

Indexing
- ISSN: 2391-5455
- OCLC no.: 464482314
- Central European Journal of Mathematics
- ISSN: 1895-1074 (print); 1644-3616 (web)

Links
- Journal homepage

Open Mathematics is a peer-reviewed open access scientific journal covering all areas of mathematics. It is published by Walter de Gruyter and the editors-in-chief are Salvatore Angelo Marano (University of Catania) and Vincenzo Vespri (University of Florence).

== Abstracting and indexing ==
The journal is abstracted and indexed in Science Citation Index Expanded, Current Contents/Physical, Chemical & Earth Sciences, Mathematical Reviews, Zentralblatt MATH, and Scopus. According to the Journal Citation Reports, the journal has a 2018 impact factor of 0.726.

== History ==
The journal was established in 2003 as the Central European Journal of Mathematics and published by Versita, since 2012 part of Walter de Gruyter, in collaboration with Springer Science+Business Media. In 2014 it was moved to the Walter de Gruyter imprint and started charging article processing charges. In protest, the editor-in-chief and the quasi-totality of the editorial board resigned and, in August 2014, established a new journal, the European Journal of Mathematics.

=== Editors-in-chief ===
The following persons have been editors-in-chief of the journal:

- Andrzej Białynicki-Birula (University of Warsaw; 2003–2004)
- Grigory Margulis (Yale University; 2004–2009)
- Fedor Bogomolov (Courant Institute of Mathematical Sciences; 2009–2014)
- Ugo Gianazza (University of Pavia; 2014–2019)
- Vincenzo Vespri (University of Florence; 2014–present)
- Salvatore Angelo Marano (University of Catania; 2020–present)
