= Algebra Colloquium =

- Discipline: Mathematics
- Language: English
- Edited by: Zhexian Wan

Publication details
- Publisher: World Scientific (Singapore)
- Frequency: Quarterly
- Impact factor: 0.343 (2016)

Standard abbreviations
- ISO 4: Algebra Colloq.

Indexing
- ISSN: 1005-3867

Links
- Journal homepage

Algebra Colloquium is a journal founded in 1994. It was initially published by Springer-Verlag Hong Kong Ltd. In 2005, from volume 12 onwards, publishing rights were taken over by World Scientific. The company now publishes the journal quarterly.

The journal is jointly edited by the Chinese Academy of Sciences and Soochow University. The journal mainly covers the field of pure and applied algebra.

According to the Journal Citation Reports, the journal has a 2020 impact factor of 0.429.

== Abstracting and indexing ==
- Science Citation Index Expanded
- Research Alert
- CompuMath Citation Index
- MathSciNet
- Mathematical Reviews
- Zentralblatt MATH
- AJ VINITI (Russian)
- Chinese Science Citation Index
- Chinese Math Abstract
