= The Quarterly Journal of Mechanics and Applied Mathematics =

- Discipline: Mechanics, applied mathematics
- Language: English
- Edited by: Peter W. Duck; Natasha V. Movchan; Michael Nieves

Publication details
- History: 1948–present
- Publisher: Oxford University Press
- Frequency: Quarterly
- Impact factor: 0.9 (2022)

Standard abbreviations
- ISO 4: Q. J. Mech. Appl. Math.
- MathSciNet: Quart. J. Mech. Appl. Math.

Indexing
- ISSN: 0033-5614
- OCLC no.: 1334524

Links
- Journal homepage

The Quarterly Journal of Mechanics and Applied Mathematics is a quarterly, peer-reviewed scientific journal covering research on classical mechanics and applied mathematics. The editors-in-chief are Peter W. Duck (University of Manchester), Natasha V. Movchan (University of Liverpool) and Michael Nieves (Keele University). The journal was established in 1948 to meet a need for a separate English journal that publishes articles focusing on classical mechanics only, in particular, including fluid mechanics and solid mechanics, that were usually published in journals like Proceedings of the Royal Society and Philosophical Transactions of the Royal Society.

== Abstracting and indexing ==
The journal is abstracted and indexed in,

- American Mathematical Society
- Mathematical Reviews
- Science Citation Index
- Zentralblatt MATH
