= Reviews in Mathematical Physics =

Mathematical physics journal

- Discipline: Mathematics, Physics
- Language: English
- Edited by: V. Bach

Publication details
- History: 1989-present
- Publisher: World Scientific (Singapore)
- Impact factor: 1.8 (2022)

Standard abbreviations
- ISO 4: Rev. Math. Phys.

Indexing
- ISSN: 0129-055X (print); 1793-6659 (web)

Links
- Journal homepage

Reviews in Mathematical Physics is a journal published by World Scientific, that covers various topics in the field of mathematical physics. It was founded in 1989 by Huzihiro Araki of Kyoto University.

== Abstracting and indexing ==
- Astrophysics Data System
- CompactMath
- Current Contents/Physical, Chemical & Earth Sciences
- Index to Scientific Reviews
- Inspec
- ISI Alerting Services
- Mathematical Reviews
- Science Citation Index
- SciSearch
- Zentralblatt MATH
