= Journal of Nonlinear Mathematical Physics =

- Discipline: Mathematics
- Language: English
- Edited by: Norbert Euler

Publication details
- Publisher: Taylor & Francis (United Kingdom)
- Impact factor: 0.986 (2016)

Standard abbreviations
- ISO 4: J. Nonlinear Math. Phys.

Indexing
- ISSN: 1402-9251 (print); 1776-0852 (web)

Links
- Journal homepage

The Journal of Nonlinear Mathematical Physics (JNMP) is a mathematical journal published by Atlantis Press. It covers nonlinear problems in physics and mathematics, include applications, with topics such as quantum algebras and integrability; non-commutative geometry; spectral theory; and instanton, monopoles and gauge theory.

== Abstracting and indexing ==
The journal is abstracted and indexed by:

- Mathematical Reviews
- Zentralblatt MATH
- Science Citation Index Expanded
- ISI Alerting Services
- CompuMath Citation Index
- Current Contents/Physical, Chemical and Earth Sciences
- Inspec
