= International Journal of Biomathematics =

- Discipline: Biomathematics
- Language: English
- Edited by: Lansun Chen

Publication details
- History: 2008-present
- Publisher: World Scientific
- Frequency: Quarterly
- Impact factor: 1.085 (2019)

Standard abbreviations
- ISO 4: Int. J. Biomath.

Indexing
- ISSN: 1793-5245 (print); 1793-7159 (web)

Links
- Journal homepage

The International Journal of Biomathematics is a quarterly mathematics journal covering research in the area of biomathematics, including mathematical ecology, infectious disease dynamical system, biostatistics and bioinformatics. It was established in 2008 and is published by World Scientific. The current editor-in-chief is Lansun Chen (Anshan Normal University).
