= International Journal of Geometric Methods in Modern Physics =

Journal

- Discipline: Mathematical physics
- Language: English
- Edited by: Salvatore Capozziello

Publication details
- History: 2004–present
- Publisher: World Scientific
- Frequency: 14/year
- Open access: Hybrid
- Impact factor: 2.1 (2023)

Standard abbreviations
- ISO 4: Int. J. Geom. Methods Mod. Phys.

Indexing
- ISSN: 0219-8878 (print); 1793-6977 (web)
- LCCN: 2004200225
- OCLC no.: 56134600

Links
- Journal homepage; Current issue; All issues

The International Journal of Geometric Methods in Modern Physics (IJGMMP) is a peer-reviewed journal, published by World Scientific, covering mathematical physics. It was originally published bimonthly beginning in January 2004; as of 2006 it appears 8 times a year, and as of 2024 it appears 14 times a year. Editorial policy for the journal specifies that "The journal publishes short communications, research and review articles devoted to the application of geometric methods (including differential geometry, algebraic geometry, global analysis and topology) to quantum field theory, non-perturbative quantum gravity, string and brane theory, quantum mechanics, semi-classical approximations in quantum theory, quantum thermodynamics and statistical physics, quantum computation and control theory."

== History ==
IJGMMP was founded in 2003 by Gennadi Sardanashvily, a theoretical physicist at Moscow State University. He served as managing editor of the journal until 2013.

== Abstracting and indexing ==
The journal is indexed in Science Citation Index Expanded, ISI Alerting Services, Inspec, Current Contents/Physical Chemical and Earth Sciences, Mathematical Reviews, Scopus, and Zentralblatt MATH. According to the Journal Citation Reports, the journal has a 2020 impact factor of 1.874.
