= Hiroshima Mathematical Journal =

- Discipline: Mathematics
- Language: English

Publication details
- History: 1930–present
- Frequency: Triannually
- Open access: Yes

Standard abbreviations
- ISO 4: Hiroshima Math. J.

Indexing
- Journal of Science of the Hiroshima University, Series A
- ISSN: 0386-3018
- Journal of Science of the Hiroshima University, Series A-I
- ISSN: 0386-3026
- Hiroshima Mathematical Journal
- ISSN: 0018-2079

The Hiroshima Mathematical Journal is an open-access mathematics journal that continues the Journal of Science of the Hiroshima University, Series A (1930–1960) and Journal of Science of the Hiroshima University, Series A - I (1961–1970). The journal contains original research papers in pure and applied mathematics. Each annual volume has had three issues since 1974.
