= Reports on Mathematical Physics =

- Discipline: Physics, mathematics
- Language: English
- Edited by: Andrzej Jamiołkowski

Publication details
- History: 1970-present
- Publisher: Elsevier (Netherlands)
- Impact factor: 0.742 (2020)

Standard abbreviations
- ISO 4: Rep. Math. Phys.

Indexing
- CODEN: RMHPBE
- ISSN: 0034-4877 (print); 1879-0674 (web)
- LCCN: 75648885
- OCLC no.: 612263343

Links
- Journal homepage

Reports on Mathematical Physics (ISSN 0034-4877) is a peer-reviewed scientific journal, started in 1970, which publishes papers in theoretical physics that present a rigorous mathematical approach to problems of quantum and classical mechanics, field theories, relativity and gravitation, statistical physics, and the mathematical foundations of physical theories. The editor-in-chief of this journal is Andrzej Jamiołkowski. The impact factor of this journal is 0.742 in 2020. The CiteScore of the journal is 1.6 in 2020.
