= Acta Mathematicae Applicatae Sinica =

- Discipline: Applied mathematics
- Language: English
- Edited by: Zhi-Ming Ma

Publication details
- History: 1984–present
- Publisher: Springer
- Frequency: Quarterly
- Open access: Hybrid
- Impact factor: 1.102 (2020)

Standard abbreviations
- ISO 4: Acta Math. Appl. Sin.

Indexing
- ISSN: 0168-9673 (print); 1618-3932 (web)
- LCCN: 88644045
- OCLC no.: 49608778

Links
- Journal homepage; Online access

Acta Mathematicae Applicatae Sinica (English series) is a peer-reviewed mathematics journal published quarterly by Springer. Established in 1984 by the Chinese Mathematical Society, the journal publishes articles on applied mathematics. According to the Journal Citation Reports, the journal had a 2020 impact factor of 1.102.
