= Real Analysis Exchange =

- Discipline: Mathematics
- Language: English

Publication details
- History: 1976 to present
- Publisher: Michigan State University Press (United States)
- Frequency: Biannual

Standard abbreviations
- ISO 4: Real Anal. Exch.
- MathSciNet: Real Anal. Exchange

Indexing
- ISSN: 0147-1937
- LCCN: 77-647120

Links
- Journal homepage

The Real Analysis Exchange (RAEX) is a biannual mathematics journal, publishing survey articles, research papers, and conference reports in real analysis and related topics. Its editor-in-chief is Paul D. Humke.
