= Mathematical Models and Methods in Applied Sciences =

- Discipline: Mathematics
- Language: English
- Edited by: Nicola Bellomo, Franco Brezzi

Publication details
- History: 1991-present
- Publisher: World Scientific (Singapore)
- Impact factor: 2.860 (2016)

Standard abbreviations
- ISO 4: Math. Models Methods Appl. Sci.

Indexing
- CODEN: MMMSEU
- ISSN: 0218-2025 (print); 1793-6314 (web)

Links
- Journal homepage

Mathematical Models and Methods in Applied Sciences is a journal founded in 1991 and published by World Scientific. It covers: mathematical modelling of systems in the applied sciences (physics, mathematical physics, natural, and technological sciences); qualitative and quantitative analysis of mathematical physics and technological sciences; and numerical and computer treatment of mathematical models or real systems.

== Abstracting and indexing ==
The journal is abstracted and indexed in:

- Science Citation Index
- ISI Alerting Services
- CompuMath Citation Index
- Current Contents/Physical, Chemical & Earth Sciences
- Mathematical Reviews
- Inspec
- Zentralblatt MATH
