= Journal of Industrial and Management Optimization =

The Journal of Industrial and Management Optimization (JIMO) is an international journal published by American Institute of Mathematical Sciences and sponsored by Department of Mathematics and Statistics, Curtin University of Technology, and Department of Mathematics, Zhejiang University. This journal illustrates original research papers on the non-trivial interplay between numerical optimization methods and problems in industry or management. The objective of this journal is to develop new optimization ideas so as to solve industrial and management problems by the use of appropriate, advanced optimization techniques.

Its impact factor has been frequently ranked by SCImago as in the top quartile of business and international management journals.
