= Letters in Mathematical Physics =

- Discipline: Mathematical physics
- Language: English
- Edited by: G. Dito, C. Fewster, M. Jimbo, A. Volovich, S. Warzel

Publication details
- History: 1975-present
- Publisher: Springer Science+Business Media
- Frequency: Bimonthly
- Open access: Hybrid
- Impact factor: 1.4 (2024)

Standard abbreviations
- ISO 4: Lett. Math. Phys.

Indexing
- CODEN: LMPHDY
- ISSN: 0377-9017 (print); 1573-0530 (web)
- LCCN: 76643569
- OCLC no.: 37915830

Links
- Journal homepage; Online archive

Letters in Mathematical Physics is a bimonthly peer-reviewed scientific journal covering mathematical physics. It was established in 1975 and is published by Springer Science+Business Media. It contains letters and longer research articles, occasionally also articles containing topical reviews. It is essentially a platform for the rapid dissemination of short contributions in the field of mathematical physics. In addition, the journal publishes "contributions to modern mathematics in fields which have a potential physical application, and [...] developments in theoretical physics which have potential mathematical impact." The editors-in-chief are Giuseppe Dito (University of Burgundy Europe), Christopher Fewster (University of York), Michio Jimbo (Rikkyo University), Anastasia Volovich (Brown University), and Simone Warzel (Technical University of Munich).

== Abstracting and indexing ==
The journal is abstracted and indexed in:

- Current Contents/Physical, Chemical & Earth Sciences
- EBSCO databases
- Inspec
- MathSciNet
- ProQuest databases
- Science Citation Index Expanded
- Scopus
- zbMATH

According to the Journal Citation Reports, the journal has a 2024 impact factor of 1.4.
