= MathSciNet =

Database of mathematical articles

- Producer: American Mathematical Society (USA)
- History: January 1996; 30 years ago
- Languages: English, German, French

Access
- Cost: Subscription

Coverage
- Disciplines: Mathematics
- Temporal coverage: Early 1800s – present
- No. of records: Over 2,900,000

Links
- Website: mathscinet.ams.org

MathSciNet is a searchable online bibliographic database created by the American Mathematical Society in 1996. It contains all of the contents of the journal Mathematical Reviews (MR) since 1940 along with an extensive author database, links to other MR entries, citations, full journal entries, and links to original articles. It contains almost 3.6 million items and over 2.3 million links to original articles.

Along with its parent publication Mathematical Reviews, MathSciNet has become an essential tool for researchers in the mathematical sciences. Access to the database is by subscription only and is not generally available to individual researchers who are not affiliated with a larger subscribing institution.

For the first 40 years of its existence, traditional typesetting was used to produce the Mathematical Reviews journal. Starting in 1980 bibliographic information and the reviews themselves were produced in both print and electronic form. This formed the basis of the first purely electronic version called MathFile launched in 1982. Further enhancements were added over the next 18 years and the current version known as MathSciNet went online in 1996.

Unlike most other abstracting databases, MathSciNet takes care to uniquely identify authors. Its author search allows the user to find publications associated with a given author record, even if multiple authors have the same name or if the same person publishes under multiple names or name variants. Mathematical Reviews personnel will sometimes even contact authors to ensure that MathSciNet has correctly attributed their papers.

MathSciNet co-develops the Mathematics Subject Classification taxonomy with zbMATH.

== Scope ==
MathSciNet contains information on over 3 million articles and over eight hundred thousand authors indexed from 1800 mathematical journals, many of them abstracted "cover-to-cover". A portion of those journals (about 450 in 2012) are designated as "Reference List Journals"; for MathSciNet entries of papers from these journals original reference lists are included.

In addition, reviews or bibliographical information on selected articles is included from many engineering, computer science and other applied journals abstracted by MathSciNet. The selection is done by the editors of Mathematical Reviews. The editors accept suggestions to cover additional journals, but do not reconsider missing articles for inclusion.

== See also ==
- All-Russian Mathematical Portal
- Zentralblatt MATH
- List of academic databases and search engines
