= Scott Galloway =

Scott Galloway may refer to:

- Scott Galloway (soccer) (born 1995), Australian soccer defender
- Scott Galloway (professor) (born 1964), American academic, entrepreneur, and podcaster
