= Prophet (company) =

American consulting firm

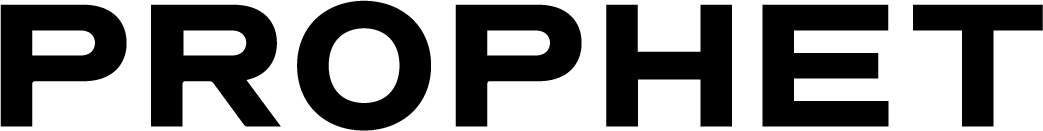
- Type: Independent
- Industry: Management consulting
- Founded: 1992; 34 years ago
- Founder: Scott Galloway; Ian Chaplin
- Headquarters: San Francisco, CA, United States
- Number of locations: 15
- Area served: Worldwide
- Key people: Michael E. Dunn, chief executive officer; David Aaker, Vice chairman; Scott Davis, Chief Growth Officer; Amy Silverstein, chief financial officer; Paul Greenall, Chief Strategy Officer
- Number of employees: 500–1000
- Subsidiaries: Altimeter Group; Springbox; KEYLENS
- Website: prophet.com

Prophet is an American growth consulting firm specializing in strategy, transformation, innovation, branding, marketing, and design. Founded in 1992 and headquartered in San Francisco, Prophet serves Fortune 500 companies and growth-stage organizations across North America, Europe, and Asia.

With 500 employees across 15 global offices, Prophet operates as an independent consulting firm focused on sustainable, human-centered growth solutions. The firm combines strategic consulting, creative design, AI and digital capabilities through a network of core teams and partner companies. The firm is known for developing BP's "Beyond Petroleum" strategy and T-Mobile's "Un-carrier" positioning—two notable brand transformations that redefined their respective categories.

== History ==
=== Founding and early years (1992-1999) ===
Prophet was founded in 1992 by Scott Galloway and Ian Chaplin, both graduates of the University of California, Berkeley's Haas School of Business. The firm was established in San Francisco with an initial focus on brand strategy and growth consulting for technology and consumer goods companies.

=== Evolution and leadership transition (1998-2005) ===
In 1998, Michael Dunn was named company president, marking a significant organizational milestone. Around the same time, David Aaker—author of "Managing Brand Equity" and brand strategy consultant—began working with Prophet. He later became company's vice chairman. In 2000, Dunn was promoted to chief executive officer, establishing the leadership structure that would guide the firm's growth through the 2000s.

During the early 2000s, Prophet built interdisciplinary teams combining strategists, analysts, and creatives to address complex growth challenges. The firm diversified its service offerings beyond traditional branding into analytics and innovation consulting, enabling clients to leverage data-driven insights for business transformation and go-to-market strategies.

=== Expansion and acquisitions (2005-2015) ===
In early 2009, Prophet acquired Play, a Richmond, Virginia-based creativity and innovation company, expanding its capabilities in experiential strategy and innovation consulting.

In 2011, Prophet acquired Noshokaty, Döring & Thun (NDT), a Berlin-based strategic marketing firm. This acquisition brought established relationships with major European clients including Allianz, Deutsche Telekom, General Motors Europe, Deutsche Postbank, Sony, and Volkswagen, significantly expanding Prophet's geographic footprint and European capabilities.

In 2012, Prophet initiated a series of strategic acquisitions to expand digital and creative capabilities:

- (r)evolution: Atlanta-based branding, marketing, and innovation consultancy
- Material Group: Chicago-based digital design and development studio
- FigTree: London, UK based design and experience agency

By 2015, Prophet acquired additional agencies including Altimeter Group, digital research and intelligence firm, to deepen digital transformation and market intelligence capabilities.

=== Further expansion and service integration (2015-present) ===
During this period, Prophet solidified its position as an integrated growth consulting firm by acquiring digital agency and management consulting firms, including:

- Springbox: Digital agency and experience design
- KEYLENS: Germany-based management consulting company focused on customer centricity and organizational transformation
- JBi Digital: London-based digital transformation agency

This model allows Prophet to deliver end-to-end growth solutions—from strategic insight and brand transformation to digital implementation and operational change management. The firm expanded into new geographic markets including Middle East operations in 2022 with offices in Dubai and Riyadh and deepened capabilities in customer experience, data analytics, and innovation management.
