= Notes on Being a Man =

2025 book by Scott Galloway

- Cover image
- Author: Scott Galloway
- Language: English
- Genre: Non-fiction, memoir
- Publisher: Simon & Schuster
- Publication date: 2025
- Publication place: United States

Notes on Being a Man is a 2025 non-fiction, memoir book by Scott Galloway.

== Overview ==
Insights into what modern men and young men are experiencing in the 21st century.

== Critical reception ==
The Wall Street Journal, "Scott Galloway offers an ‘aspirational vision of masculinity,’ challenging men to get offline and develop their physical and emotional strength."

The Guardian, "In his book, Galloway’s solutions to men’s problems often boil down to a set of pithy codes and maxims, some of which feel like sound common sense, while others might feel rather old-fashioned."
