= List of atheists (miscellaneous) =

This is a list of atheists. Living persons in this list are people whose atheism is relevant to their notable activities or public life, and who have publicly identified themselves as atheists.

== Assassins ==
- Gavrilo Princip (1894–1918): Assassin of Austrian Archduke Franz Ferdinand and the Archduke's wife, Sophie, Duchess of Hohenberg, in Sarajevo on June 28, 1914.
- Leon Czolgosz (1873–1901): Assassin of American President William McKinley on September 6, 1901.
- Lee Harvey Oswald (1939–1963): Assassin of American President John F. Kennedy on November 22, 1963.

== Business ==
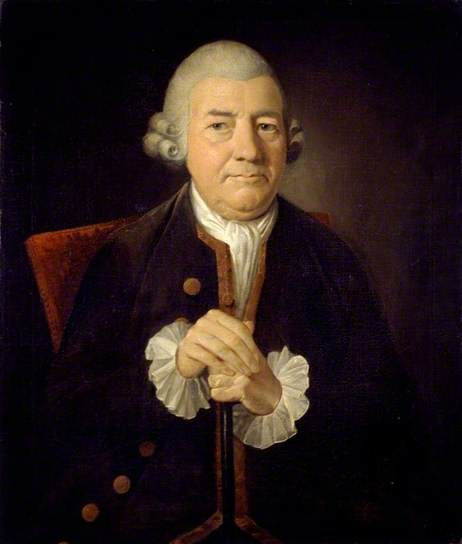
John Baskerville

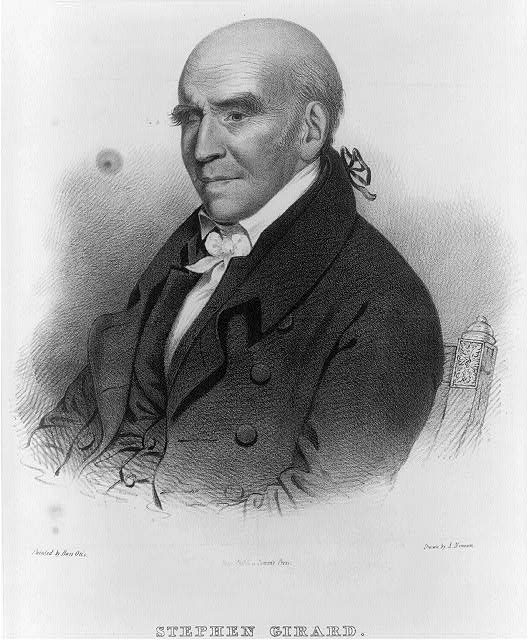
Stephen Girard

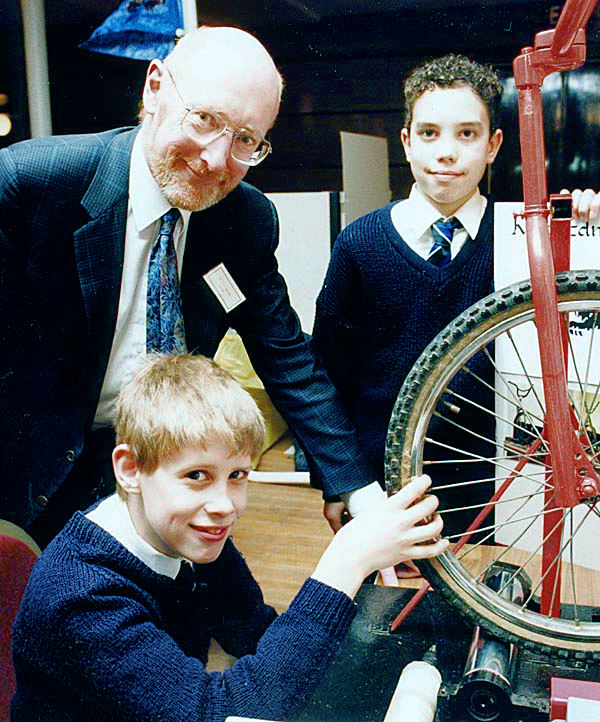
Clive Sinclair

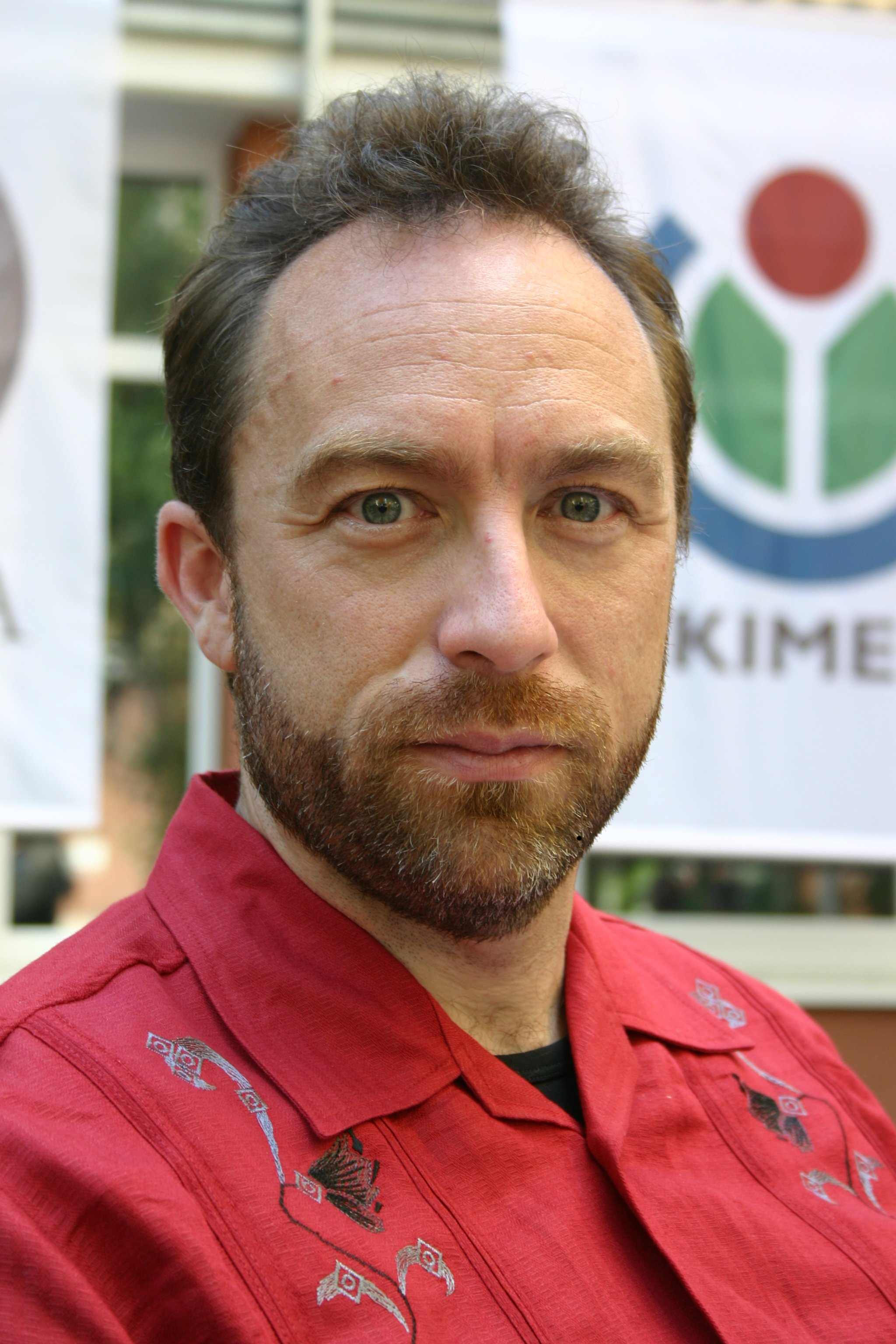
Jimmy Wales

- John Baskerville (1706–1775): English typesetter, printing innovator and typefounder, designer of the typeface that bears his name.
- Richard Branson (1950–): English business magnate, investor and philanthropist.
- Andrew Carnegie (1835–1919): Scottish-American industrialist, who led the expansion of the steel industry. Later in life, he became one of the highest–profile philanthropists of his era.
- Doug Casey (1946–): American libertarian economist, author of 4 books, including Totally Incorrect: Conversations with Doug Casey (2012).
- Felix Dennis (1947–2014): British magazine publisher and philanthropist.
- Larry Flynt (1942–2021): American publisher and the head of Larry Flynt Publications.
- Scott Galloway (professor), born 1964: American public speaker, author, podcast host, entrepreneur; clinical professor of marketing at the New York University Stern School of Business. Galloway identifies as an atheist.
- Stephen Girard (1750–1831): French sailor turned American banker and philanthropist.
- Allan Pinkerton (1819–1884): Scottish-born American detective and spy, best known for creating the Pinkerton Agency, the first detective agency of the United States.
- Graeme Samuel (1946–): Australian businessman, former chairman of the Australian Competition & Consumer Commission.
- Clive Sinclair (1940–2021): British entrepreneur and inventor of the world's first 'slim-line' electronic pocket calculator and early personal computers.
- Christer Sturmark (1964–): Swedish IT entrepreneur and chairman of The Swedish Humanist Organisation.
- Alan Sugar (1947–): English entrepreneur, businessman, and television personality.
- Jimmy Wales (1966–): American internet entrepreneur and co-founder and promoter of Wikipedia and Wikia.
- Will Wyatt (1942–): British media consultant and company director, formerly a journalist, television producer and senior executive at the BBC.

== Comedians ==
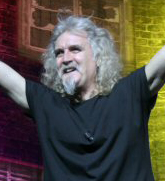
Connolly

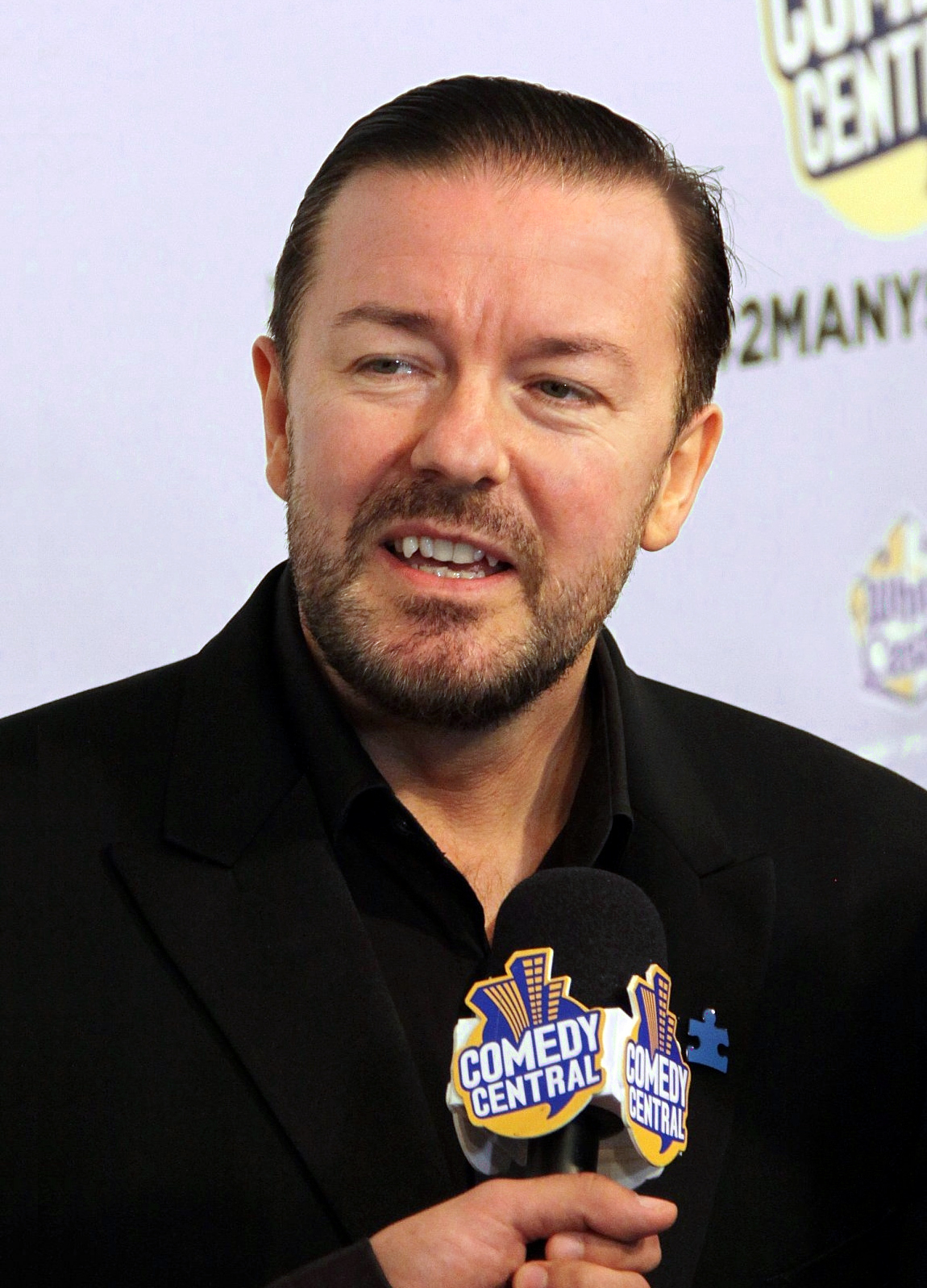
Gervais

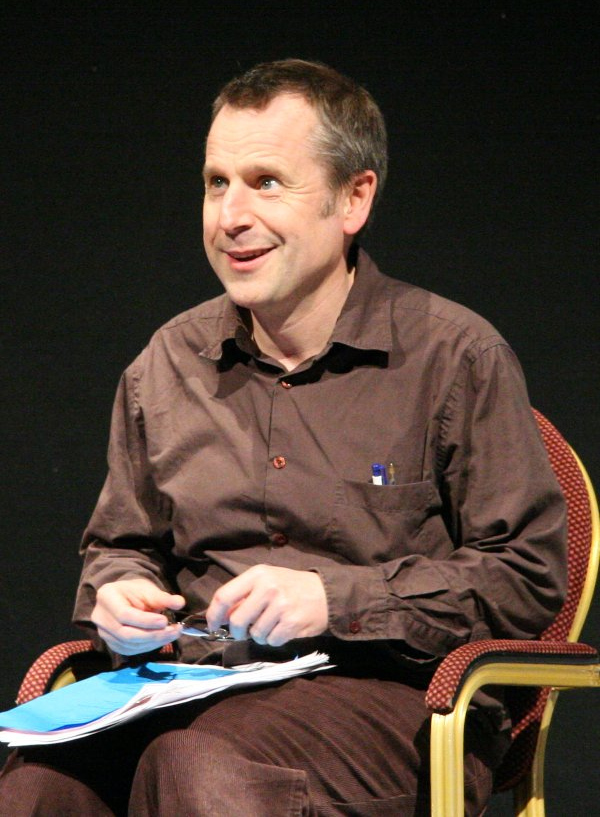
Hardy

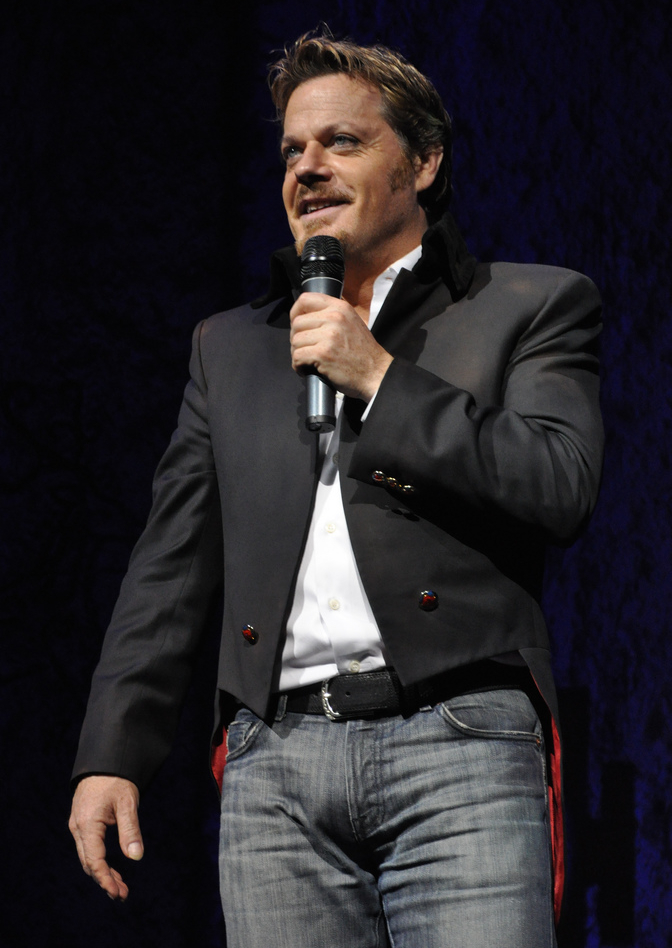
Izzard

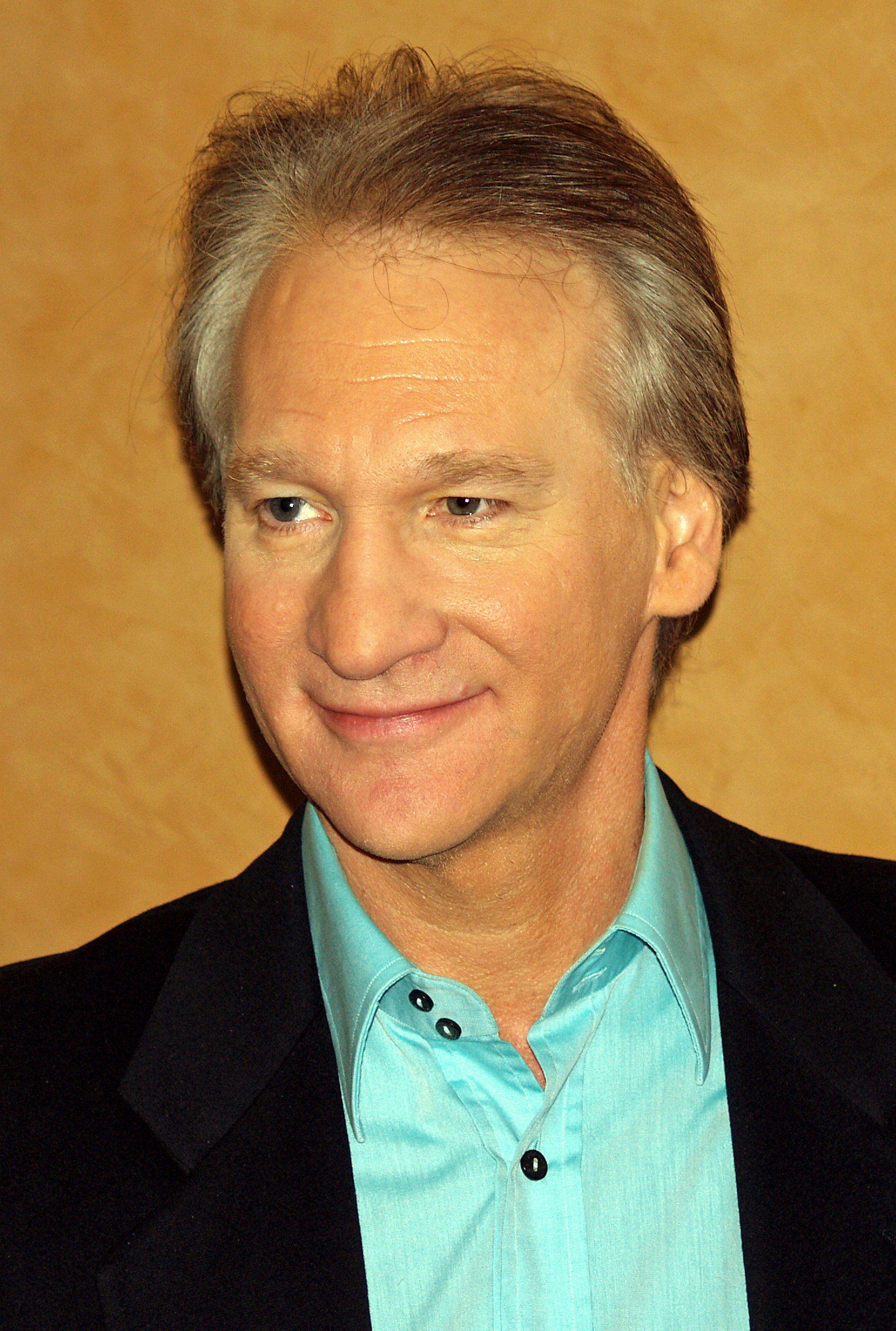
Maher

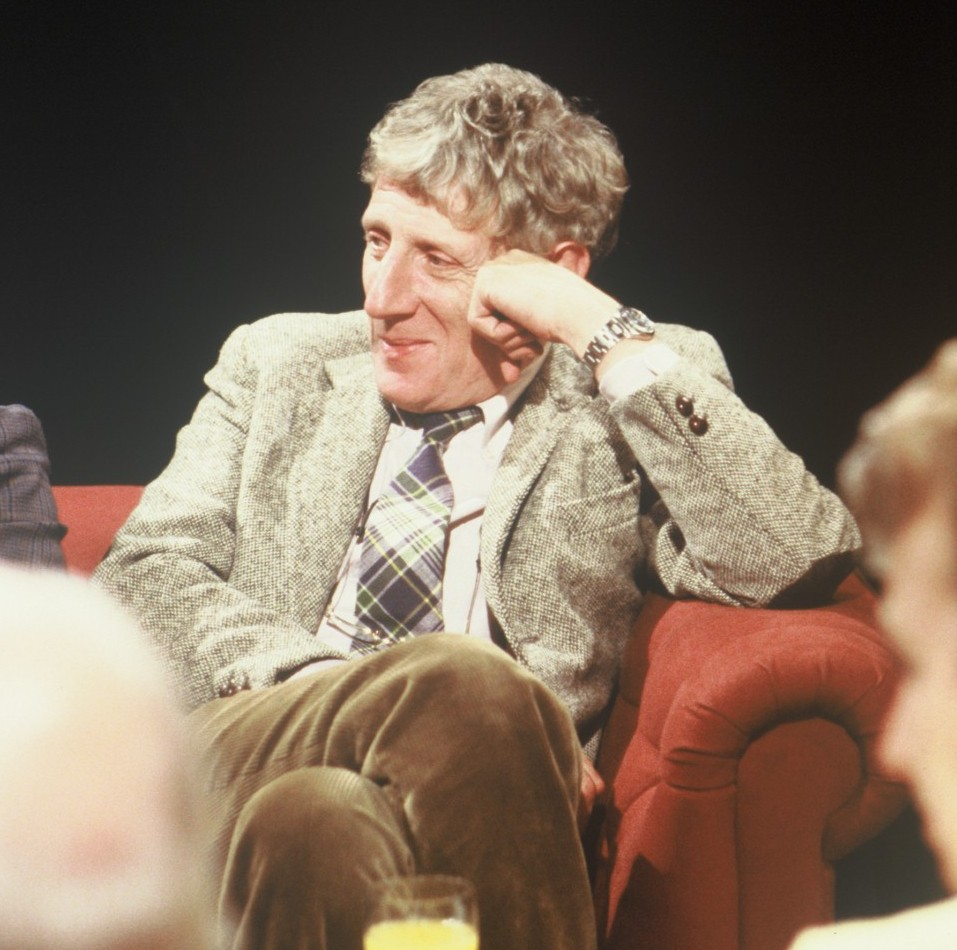
Miller

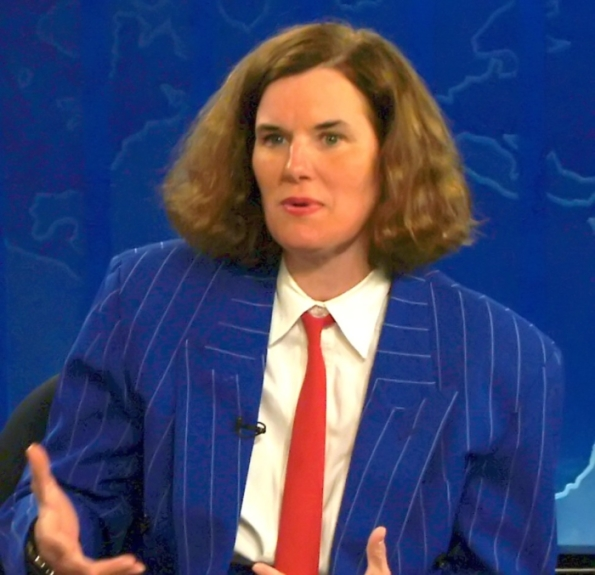
Poundstone

- Dave Allen (1936–2005): Irish comedian, popular on United Kingdom and Australian television in the 1960s, 1970s and also in the 1990s.
- Russell Peters (1970–): Canadian comedian.
- Keith Allen (1953–): British comedian, actor, singer and writer, father of Lily Allen.
- Wil Anderson (1974–): Australian television, radio and stand-up comedian, former host of ABC's The Glass House.
- Chico Anysio (1931–2012): Brazilian comedian.
- Matt Besser (1967–): American comedian.
- Abie Philbin Bowman (19??–): Irish comedian and columnist, writer/director/performer of Jesus: The Guantanamo Years.
- Marcus Brigstocke (1973–): English comedian, satirist and presenter of The Late Edition.
- Adam Carolla (1964–): American comedian, actor and comedy writer.
- Jimmy Carr (1972–): English-Irish comedian.
- Dean Cameron (1962–): American actor, comedian and musician
- Pat Condell (1951–): English comedian, writer and secularist.
- Billy Connolly (1942–): Scottish comedian, musician and presenter, also known as an actor in films such as Lemony Snicket's A Series of Unfortunate Events, The Man Who Sued God and Mrs. Brown.
- David Cross (1964–): American actor and comedian.
- Larry David (1947–): American actor, writer, comedian, and producer.
- Catherine Deveny (1968–): Australian comedy writer, stand-up comedian and sometimes controversial opinion columnist in the Age newspaper.
- Emery Emery (1963–): American comedian, producer/director/editor and author and webshow host; outspoken atheist who is a contributing author of The Atheist's Guide To Christmas and host of webshow Ardent Atheist with Emery Emery.
- Ben Elton (1959–): English comedian, writer and director.
- Janeane Garofalo (1964–): American actress and comedian.
- Ricky Gervais (1961–): British comedian and actor, co-creator of the original version of The Office.
- Kathy Griffin (1960–): American comedian.
- Greg Gutfeld (1964-): American comedian and Fox News correspondent
- Andy Hamilton (1954–): English comedian, game show panellist, director and comedy scriptwriter for television and radio.
- Jeremy Hardy (1961–2019): English alternative comedian, frequently on BBC Radio 4 shows such as The News Quiz and I'm Sorry I Haven't a Clue.
- Richard Herring (1967–): British comedian and writer, best known as part of Lee and Herring.
- Robin Ince (1969–): English stand-up comedian, actor, writer and impressionist.
- Reggie Watts (1972–): American musician, singer, beatboxer, actor, and comedian.
- Eddie Izzard (1962–): English stand-up comedian and actor, winner of several awards.
- Jim Jefferies (1977–): Australian comedian.
- Anthony Jeselnik (1978–): American comedian, television host, writer, producer, and actor.
- Dom Joly (1967–): Award-winning British television comedian and journalist, best known as the star of Trigger Happy TV.
- Myq Kaplan (1978–): American stand-up comedian.
- Stewart Lee (1968–): English stand-up comedian, writer and director, best known as one half of Lee and Herring and for co-writing and directing the critically acclaimed and controversial stage show Jerry Springer: The Opera.
- Seth MacFarlane (1973–): American actor, voice actor, animator, screenwriter, comedian, producer, director, and singer. He is best known as the creator of the animated sitcom Family Guy (1999–2003, 2005–present) and as co-creator of American Dad! (2005–present) and The Cleveland Show (2009–2013), for which he also voices many of the shows' various characters.
- Bill Maher (1956–): American comedian, author, political satirist and host of HBO's Real Time with Bill Maher.
- Jonathan Miller CBE (1934–2019): British actor, theatre and opera director, humorist, physician and television presenter. Wrote and presented the 2004 television series, Atheism: A Rough History of Disbelief, exploring the roots of his own atheism and investigating the history of atheism in the world.
- Tim Minchin (1975–): Australian comedian, actor, composer, songwriter, pianist, musical director, winner of the 2005 Best Newcomer Perrier Comedy Award.
- Dylan Moran (1971–): Irish comedian, most famous for the creation and role in hit British sitcom Black Books, as well as his work with Simon Pegg in movies such as Shaun of the Dead and Run Fatboy Run.
- Dermot Morgan (1952–1998): Irish comedian and actor, who achieved international renown as Father Ted Crilly in the Channel 4 sitcom Father Ted.
- Dara Ó Briain (1972–): Irish comedian and television presenter.
- Patton Oswalt (1969–): American actor and comedian.
- Volker Pispers (1958–): German political Kabarett artist and critic of capitalism.
- Paula Poundstone (1959–): An American stand-up comedian. She is known for her quiet, self-deprecating style, political observations, and her trademark style of dress: a suit and tie.
- Brian Quinn (1976–): American stand-up comedian and star of Impractical Jokers
- Arthur Smith (1954–): English alternative comedian and writer.
- Linda Smith (1958–2006): English comedian and comedy writer, president of the British Humanist Association from 2004 until her death.
- Doug Stanhope (1967–): American stand-up comedian, former host of Comedy Central's The Man Show.
- Julia Sweeney (1959–): American actor and comedian. Alumna of Saturday Night Live, author/performer of a one-woman autobiographical stage show about finding atheism: Letting Go of God.
- Mark Thomas (1963–): English comedian, presenter, political activist and reporter, best known for political stunts on his show, The Mark Thomas Comedy Product on UK Channel 4.
- Paul F. Tompkins (1968–): American comedian, actor and writer.
- Gene Weingarten (1951–): Humor writer for The Washington Post.
- Ricardo Araújo Pereira (1974–): Portuguese comedian, writer and actor.
- Hannibal Buress (1983–): American comedian, actor, and producer.
- Herman José (1954–): Portuguese comedian, actor and singer.

== Explorers ==
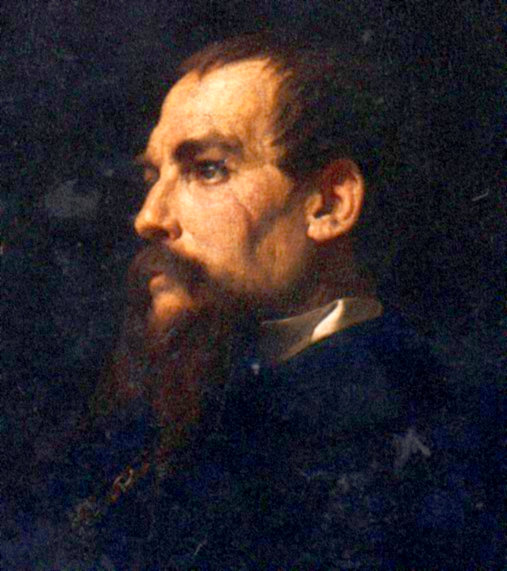
Burton

- Richard Francis Burton (1821–1890): English geographer, explorer, translator, writer, soldier, orientalist, cartographer, ethnologist, spy, linguist, poet, fencer and diplomat. He was known for his travels and explorations within Asia, Africa and the Americas, as well as his extraordinary knowledge of languages and cultures.
- Ármin Vámbéry (1832–1913): Hungarian Turkolog and traveler.

== Historians ==
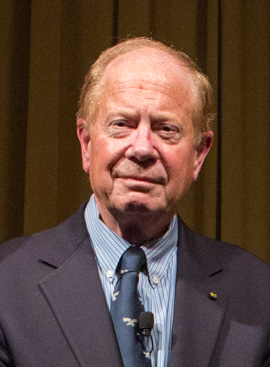
Ellis

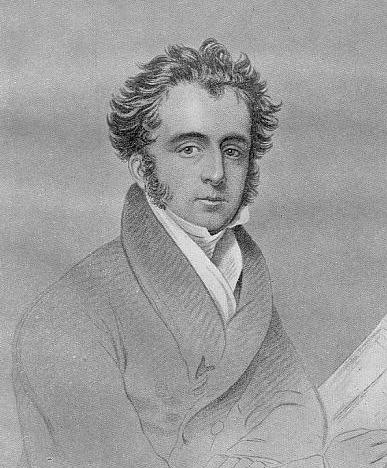
Grote

- Richard Carrier (1969–): American independent scholar and advocate for both atheism and metaphysical naturalism.
- G. E. M. de Ste. Croix (1910–2000): British historian, specializing in examining the classical era from a historical materialist perspective.
- Joseph Ellis (1943–): noted American historian of the United States, speaking on the publication of his 2018 book, American Dialogue: The Founders and Us.
- Constantine Fitzgibbon (1919–1983): Irish-American historian and novelist.
- George Grote (1794–1871): English classical historian, best known in that field for his voluminous History of Greece, still read.
- Keith Hopkins (1934–2004): British classical historian and sociologist, professor of ancient history at the University of Cambridge 1985–2001.
- Robin Lane Fox (1946–): English academic and historian, currently a Fellow of New College, Oxford, Lecturer in Ancient History at Exeter College, Oxford and University Reader in Ancient History.
- James Murdoch (Scottish journalist) (1856–1921): Scottish scholar and journalist, whose three-volume History of Japan was the first comprehensive history of Japan in the English language.
- Tony Parker (1923–1996): English oral historian, whose work was dedicated to giving a voice to British and American society's most marginalised figures.
- Pierre Vidal-Naquet (1930–2006): French classical historian.

== Military ==
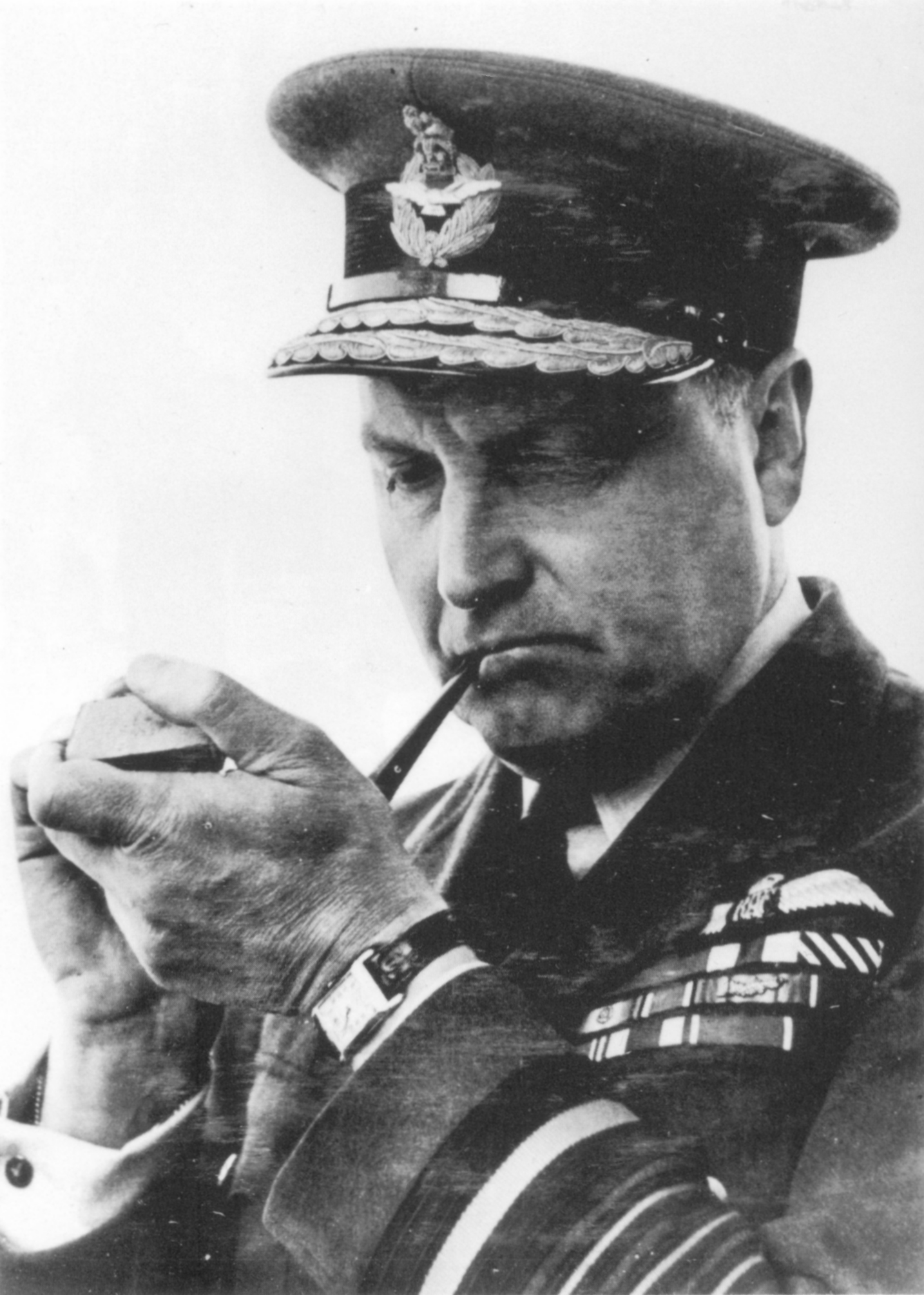
Douglas

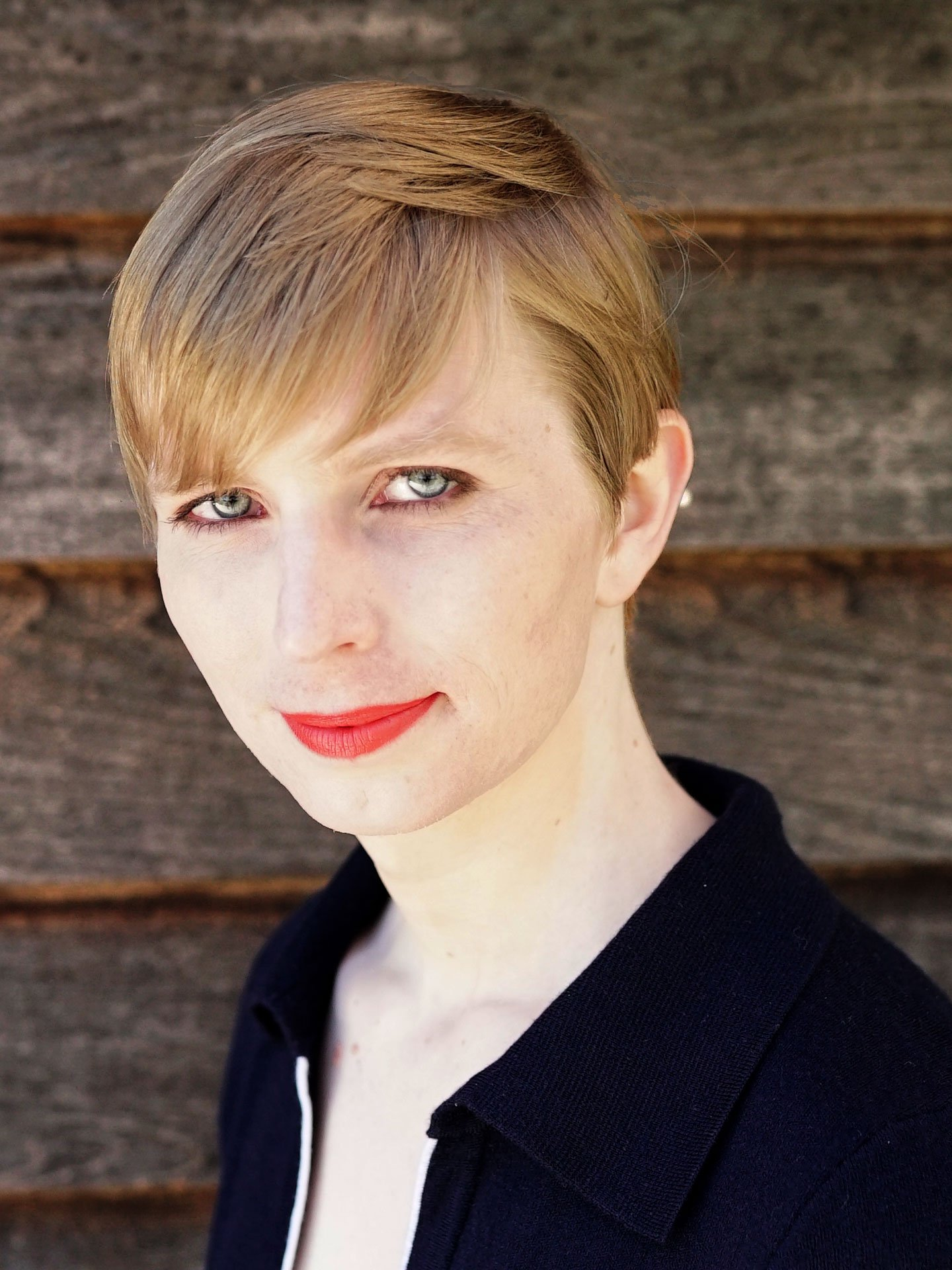
Manning

- Abdul Rashid Dostum (1954–): Afghani military figure, the current leader of Uzbek-Afghan northern provinces.
- William Sholto Douglas, Baron Douglas of Kirtleside, Marshal of the Royal Air Force GCB, MC, DFC (1893–1969): Distinguished British airman, a senior figure in the Royal Air Force up to and during World War II.
- Jeremy Hall (1985–): American army specialist who sued the U.S. Department of Defense, alleging his atheism led to discrimination, death threats and being denied promotions.
- Chelsea Manning (1987–): American soldier who was arrested in May 2010 in Iraq on suspicion of having passed classified material to the website WikiLeaks.
- Velupillai Prabhakaran (1954–2009): Sri Lankan guerrilla who founded the Tamil Tigers, a Marxist–Leninist organization that promoted atheism and was "adamantly opposed to religion".
- Lakshmi Sahgal (1914–2012): Activist of the Indian independence movement, an ex-officer of the Indian National Army, Member of CPI (M), and the Minister of Women's affairs in the Azad Hind Government.

== Social sciences ==
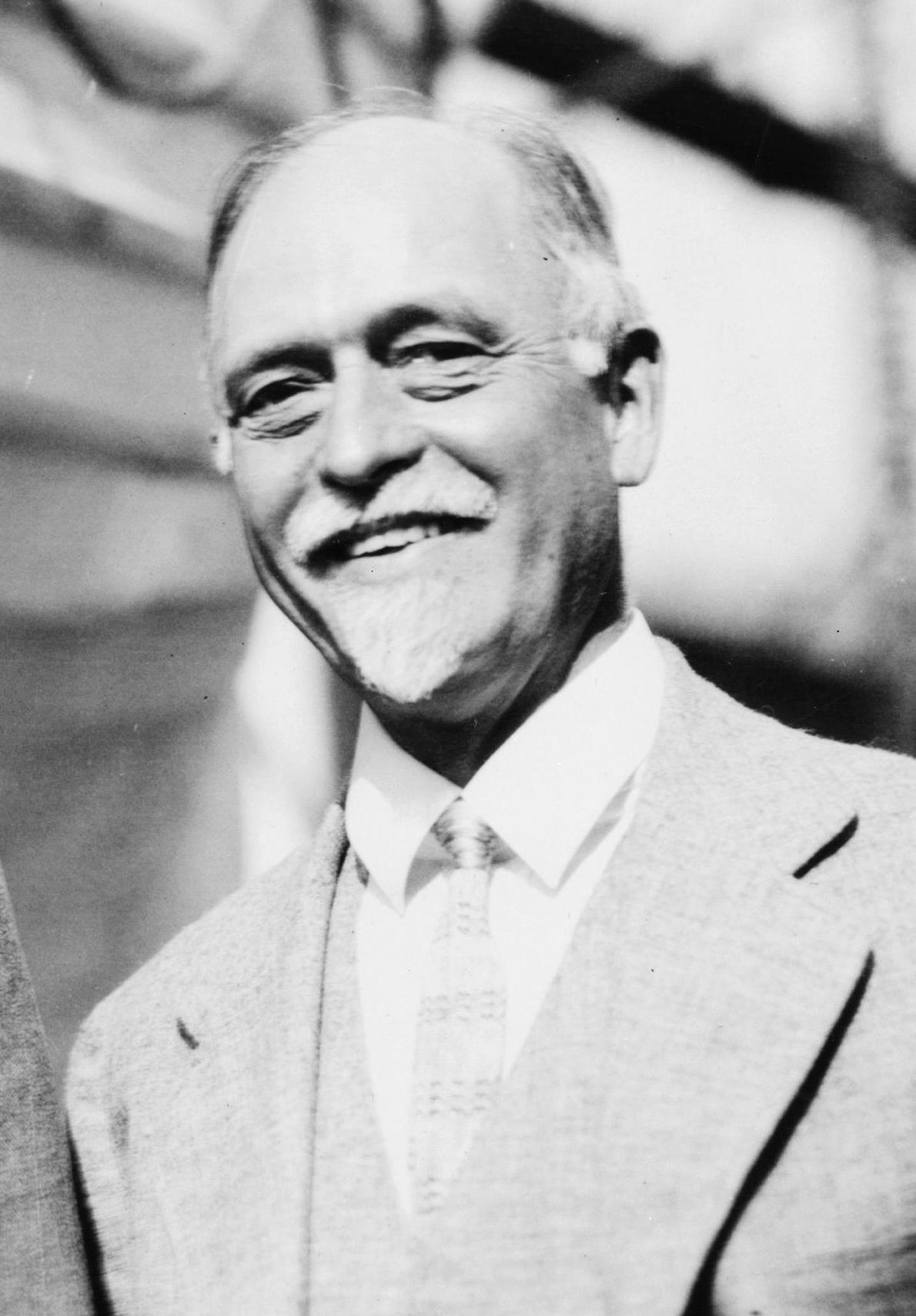
Fisher

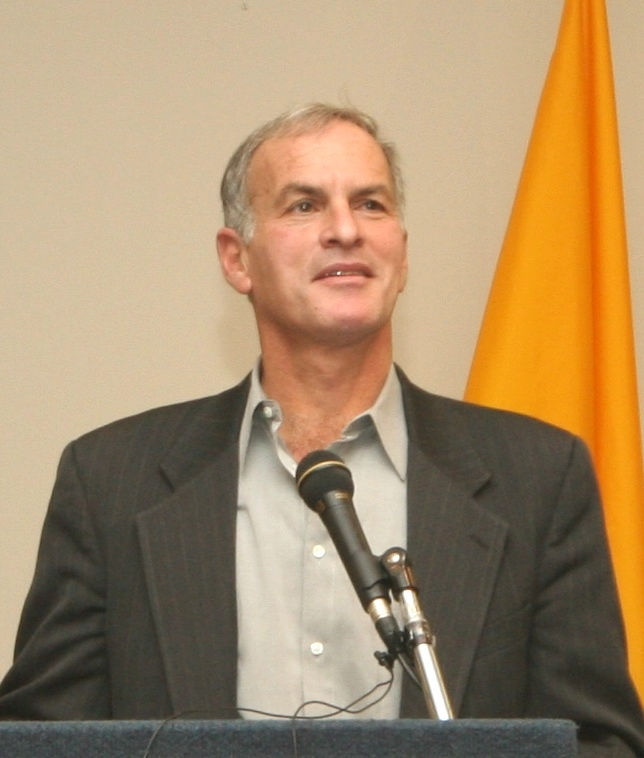
Finkelstein

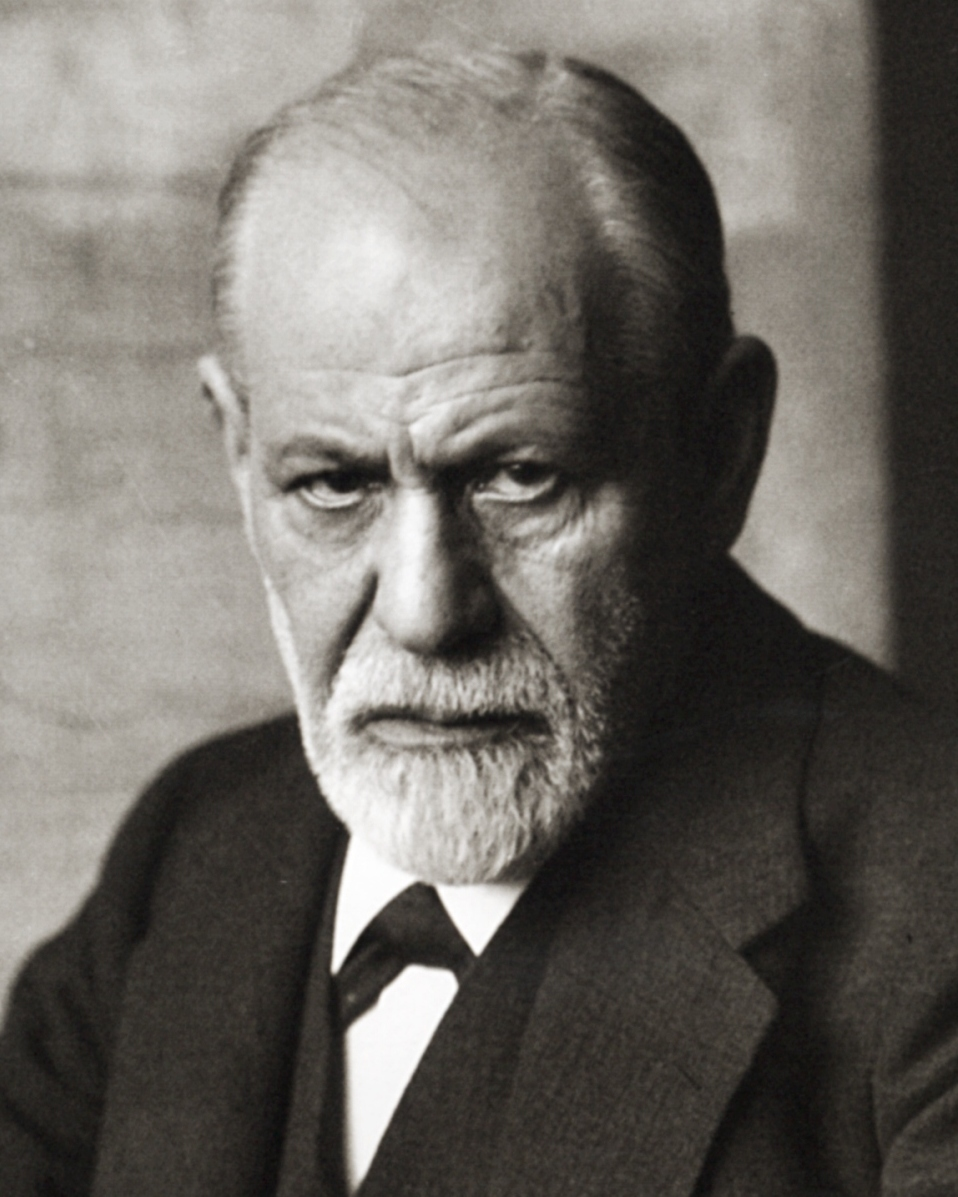
Freud

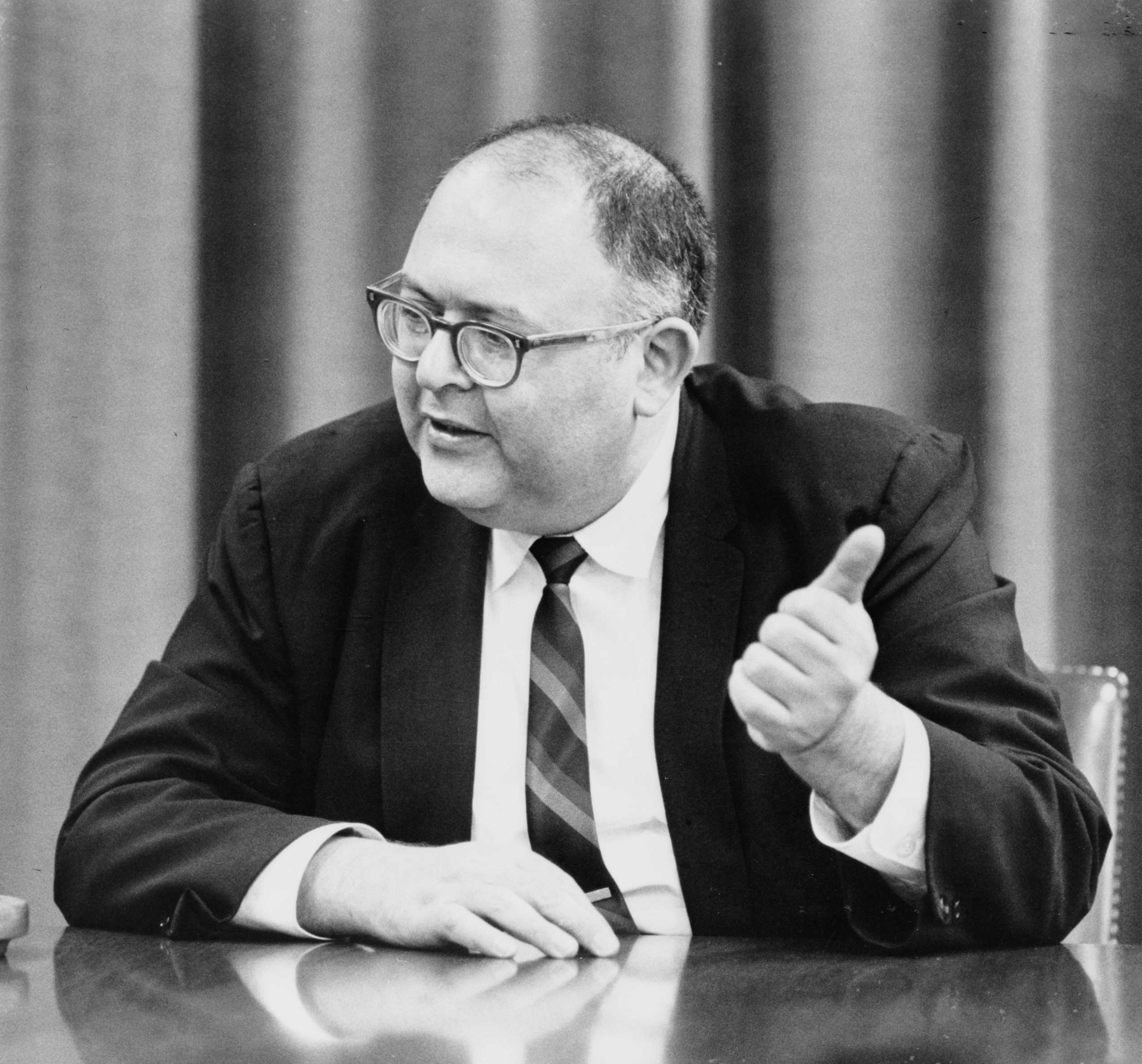
Kahn

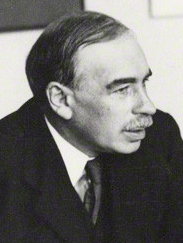
Keynes

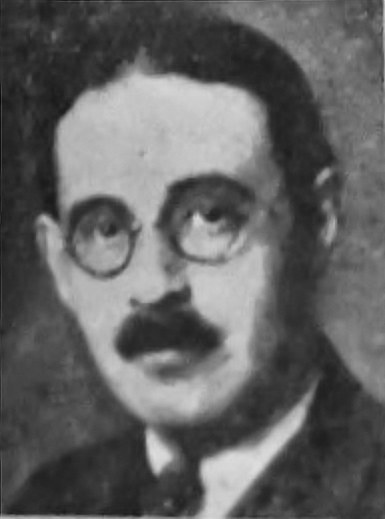
Laski

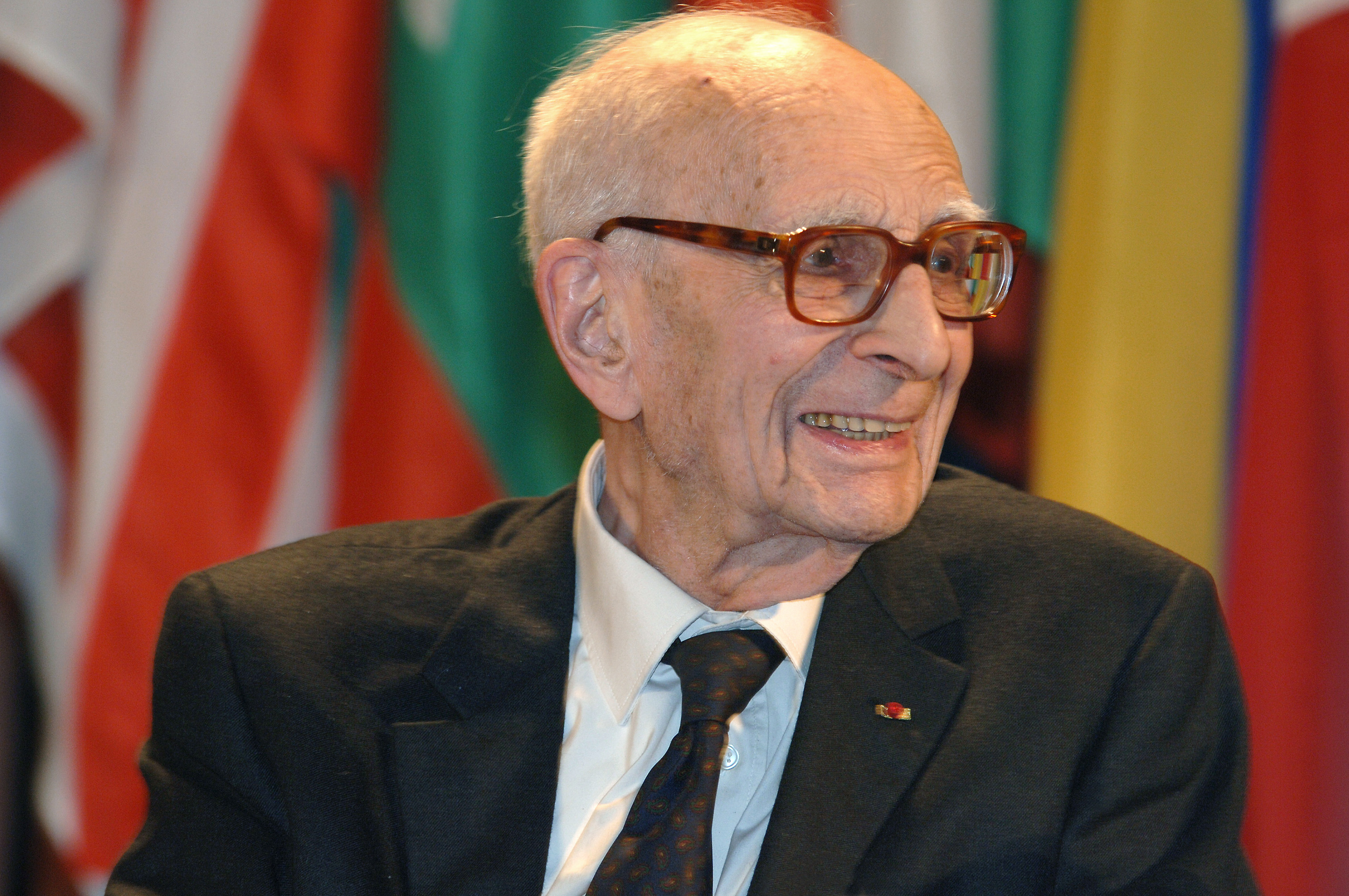
Levi-Srauss

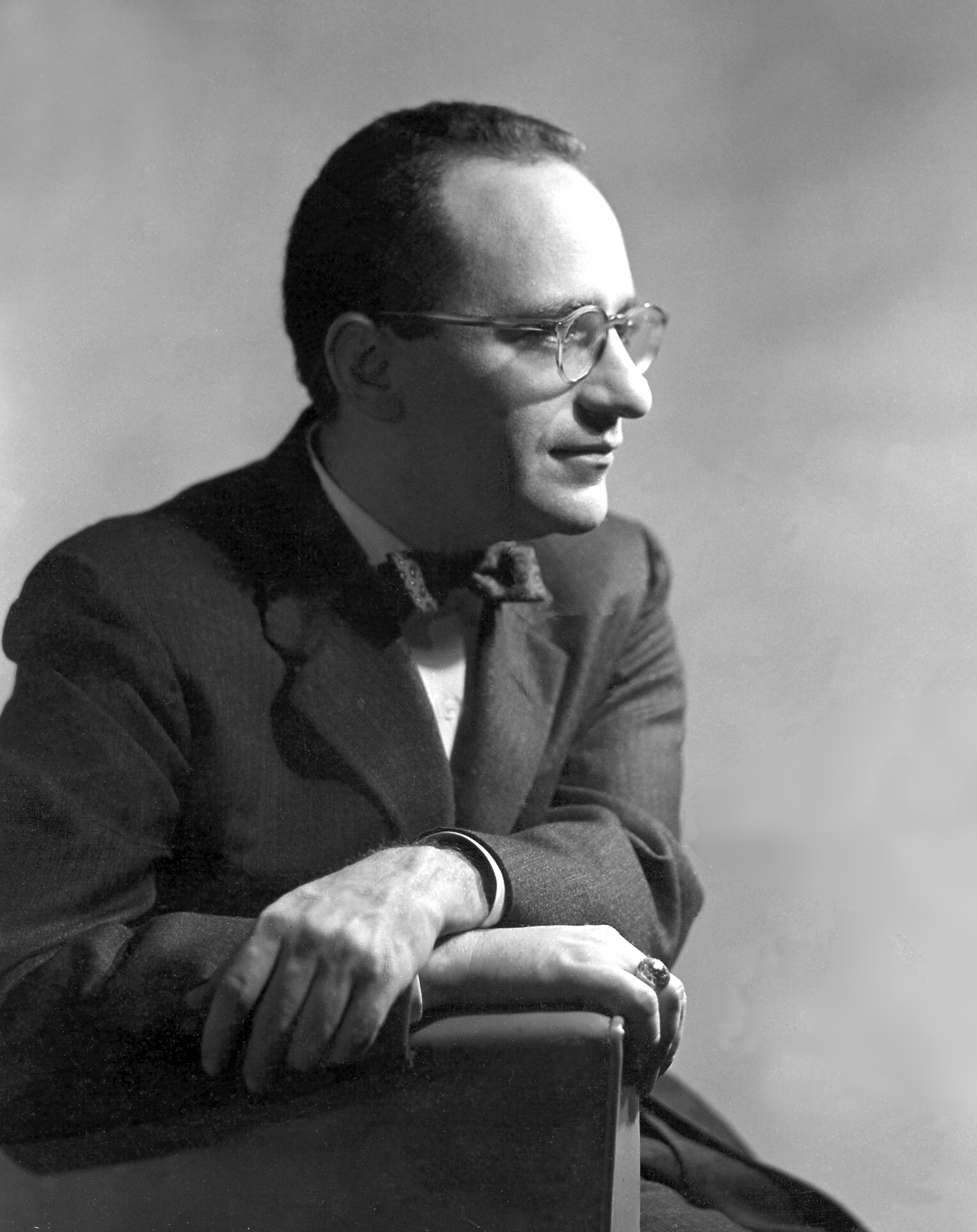
Rothbard

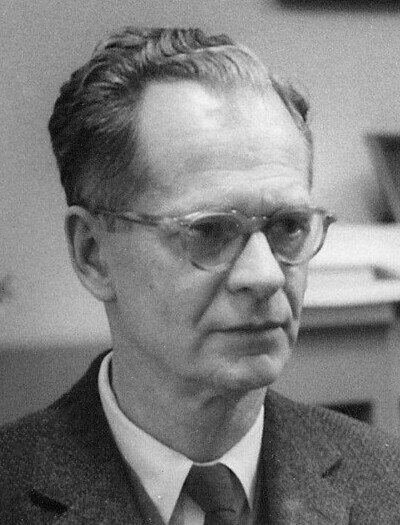
Skinner

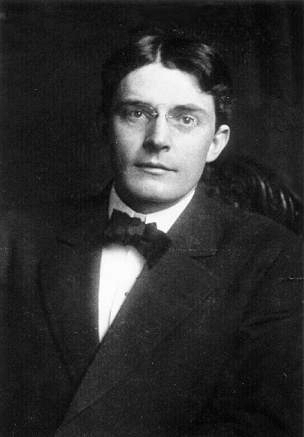
Watson

- Hector Avalos (1958–2021): Mexican-American professor of Religious Studies at Iowa State University and author of several books about religion.
- Scott Atran (1952–): American cultural anthropologist.
- Gregory Bateson (1904–1980): English anthropologist, social scientist, linguist, visual anthropologist, semiotician and cyberneticist whose work intersected that of many other fields.
- Raymond Cattell (1905–1998): British and American psychologist, known for his exploration of many areas in psychology.
- Herbert de Souza (1935–1997): Brazilian sociologist and activist against economic injustice and government corruption in Brazil, and founder of the Brazilian Institute of Social Analysis and Economics (IBASE).
- Albert Ellis (1913–2007): American psychologist who in 1955 developed Rational Emotive Behavior Therapy (REBT).
- Hans Eysenck (1916–1997): German-British psychologist who spent most of his career in Britain, best remembered for his work on intelligence and personality, though he worked in a wide range of areas. At the time of his death, Eysenck was the living psychologist most frequently cited in science journals.
- Leon Festinger (1919–1989): American social psychologist famous for his Theory of Cognitive Dissonance.
- Norman Finkelstein (1953–): American political scientist and author, specialising in Jewish-related issues, especially the Holocaust and the Israeli–Palestinian conflict.
- Sir Raymond Firth CNZM, FBA (1901–2002): New Zealand ethnologist, considered to have singlehandedly created a form of British economic anthropology.
- Irving Fisher (1867–1947): was an American economist, inventor, and social campaigner. He was one of the earliest American neoclassical economists, though his later work on debt deflation has been embraced by the Post-Keynesian school. Fisher made important contributions to utility theory and general equilibrium. He was also a pioneer in the rigorous study of intertemporal choice in markets, which led him to develop a theory of capital and interest rates. His research on the quantity theory of money inaugurated the school of macroeconomic thought known as "monetarism." Some concepts named after Fisher include the Fisher equation, the Fisher hypothesis, the International Fisher effect, and the Fisher separation theorem.
- Michel Foucault (1926–1984): French philosopher, historian, critic and sociologist.
- Sigmund Freud (1856–1939): Austrian neurologist and known as Father of psychoanalysis.
- Erich Fromm (1900–1980): German social psychologist, psychoanalyst, sociologist, humanistic philosopher, and democratic socialist. He was associated with what became known as the Frankfurt School of critical theory.
- G. Stanley Hall (1844–1924): American psychologist and educator. His interests focused on childhood development and evolutionary theory. Hall was the first president of the American Psychological Association and the first president of Clark University.
- Jonathan Haidt (c.1964–): Associate professor of psychology at the University of Virginia, focusing on the psychological bases of morality across different cultures, and author of The Happiness Hypothesis.
- John Harsanyi (1920–2000): Hungarian-Australian-American economist and Nobel Memorial Prize in Economic Sciences winner.
- Mayer Hillman (1931–): British political scientist, architect and town planner, a Senior Fellow Emeritus at the Policy Studies Institute.
- Ernest Jones (1879–1958): British neurologist and psychoanalyst, and Sigmund Freud’s official biographer.
- Herman Kahn (1922–1983): American futurist, military strategist and systems theorist. He was known for analyzing the likely consequences of nuclear war and recommending ways to improve survivability; a notoriety that made him an inspiration for the title character of Stanley Kubrick's classic black comedy film satire, Dr. Strangelove.
- John Maynard Keynes (1883–1946): British economist who was one of the most influential economists of the 20th century.
- Baruch Kimmerling (1939–2007): Romanian-born professor of sociology at the Hebrew University of Jerusalem.
- Kemal Kirişci (1954–): Turkish political scientist, professor at the Department of Political Science and International Relations at Boğaziçi University, Istanbul.
- Melanie Klein (1882–1960): Austrian-born British psychoanalyst who devised novel therapeutic techniques for children that influenced child psychology and contemporary psychoanalysis. She was a leading innovator in theorizing object relations theory.
- Frank Knight (1885–1972): American economist who spent most of his career at the University of Chicago, where he became one of the founders of the Chicago school.
- Jacques Lacan (1901–1981): French psychoanalyst and psychiatrist who made prominent contributions to psychoanalysis and philosophy, and has been called "the most controversial psycho-analyst since Freud".
- Steven Landsburg (1954–): American economist.
- Harold Laski (1893–1950): British political theorist, economist, author, and lecturer, active in politics (British Labour Party chairman, 1945–46), professor at the London School of Economics 1926–50. He repudiated his faith in Judaism, claiming that Reason prevented him from believing in God.
- Peter Lawrence (1921–1987): British-born Australian anthropologist, pioneer in the study of Melanesian religions noted for his work on cargo cults.
- Sir Edmund Leach (1910–1989): British social anthropologist, a Fellow of the British Academy.
- James H. Leuba (1868–1946): American psychologist, one of the leading figures of the early phase of the American psychology of religion movement.
- Cesare Lombroso (1835–1909): Italian criminologist, physician and founder of the Italian school of criminology.
- Paolo Mantegazza (1831–1910): Italian neurologist, physiologist and anthropologist, noted for his experimental investigation of coca leaves into its effects on the human psyche.
- Abraham Maslow (1908–1970): American psychologist. He was a professor of psychology at Brandeis University, Brooklyn College, New School for Social Research and Columbia University who created Maslow's hierarchy of needs.
- Franz Leopold Neumann (1900–1954): German political scientist, known for theoretical analyses of National Socialism, and considered among the founders of modern political science in Germany.
- Will Provine (1942–2015): American historian of science.
- Alfred Radcliffe-Brown (1881–1955): English social anthropologist who developed the theory of Structural functionalism.
- Wilhelm Reich (1897–1957): Austrian psychiatrist and psychoanalyst, known as one of the most radical figures in the history of psychiatry.
- David Ricardo (1772–1823): English political economist, scientist and stock trader. He was often credited with systematising economics, and was one of the most influential of the classical economists, along with Thomas Malthus, Adam Smith, and John Stuart Mill.
- Carl Rogers (1902–1987): American psychologist and among the founders of the humanistic approach to psychology. Rogers is widely considered to be one of the founding fathers of psychotherapy research and was honored for his pioneering research with the Award for Distinguished Scientific Contributions by the American Psychological Association in 1956.
- Murray Rothbard (1926–1995): American economist, historian and political theorist. He was a prominent exponent of the Austrian School of economics who helped to define capitalist libertarianism, and he popularized a form of free-market anarchism which he termed "anarcho-capitalism."
- Edwin S. Shneidman (1918–2009): American clinical psychologist, suicidologist, and thanatologist who founded the Los Angeles Suicide Prevention Center in 1958.
- Boris Sidis (1867–1923): Ukrainian psychologist, physician, psychiatrist, and philosopher of education.
- Herbert A. Simon (1916–2001): American political scientist and economist, one of the most influential social scientists of the 20th century.
- B. F. Skinner (1904–1990): American psychologist, behaviorist, author, inventor, social philosopher and poet.
- Robert Spitzer (1932–2015): American psychiatrist, Professor of Psychiatry at Columbia University, a major architect of the modern classification of mental disorders.
- Francesca Stavrakopoulou (1975–): Senior lecturer in the University of Exeter's department of Theology and Religion and presenter of the BBC series The Bible's Buried Secrets.
- Claude Lévi-Strauss (1908–2009): French anthropologist and ethnologist, and has been called, along with James George Frazer, the "father of modern anthropology".
- Laurie Taylor (1936–): British sociologist and radio presenter.
- Georges Vacher de Lapouge (1854–1936): French anthropologist and eugenicist.
- John B. Watson (1878–1958): American psychologist who established the psychological school of behaviorism.
- Knut Wicksell (1851–1926): Swedish economist of the Stockholm school. His economic contributions would influence both the Keynesian and Austrian schools of economic thought.

== Sports ==
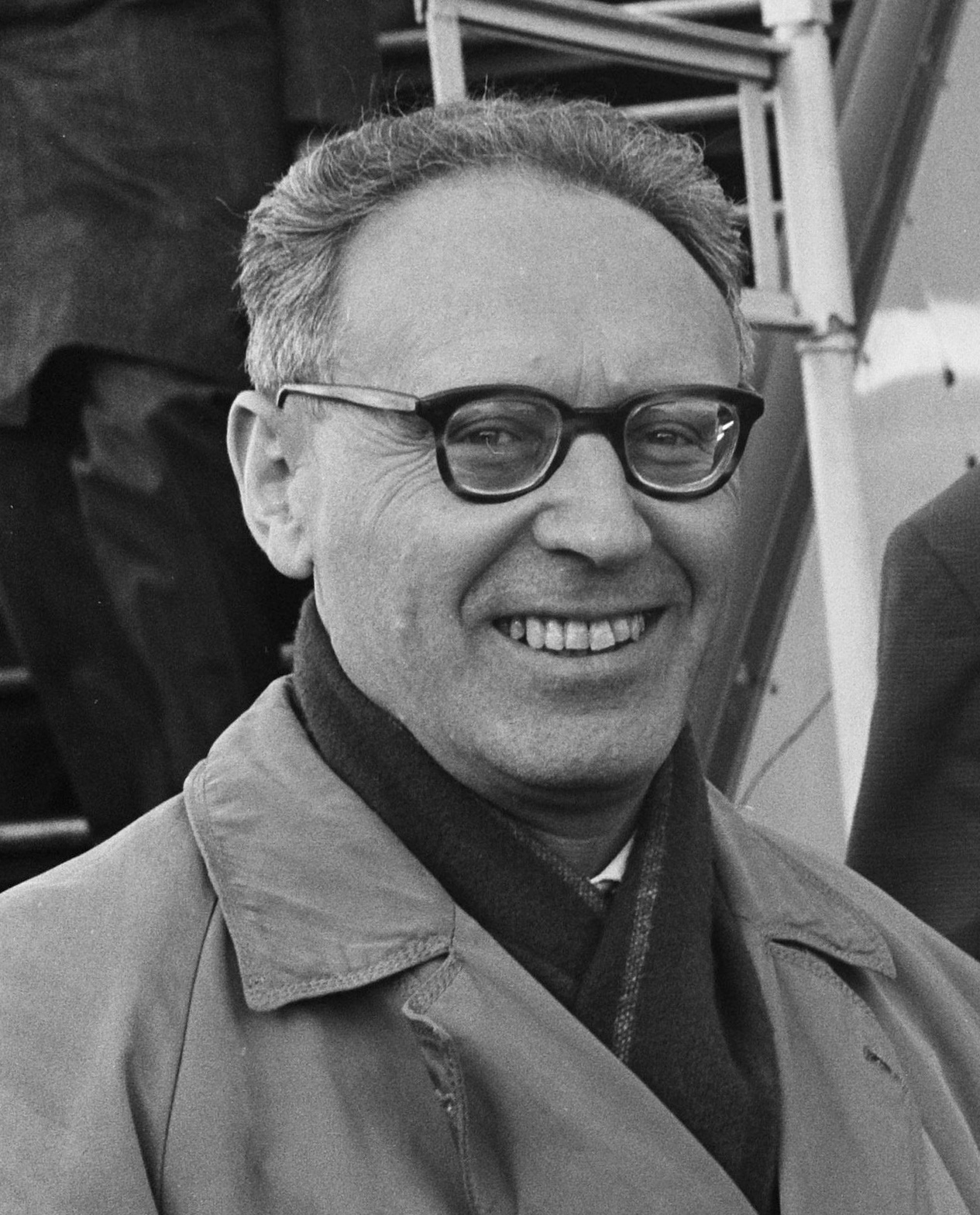
Botvinnik

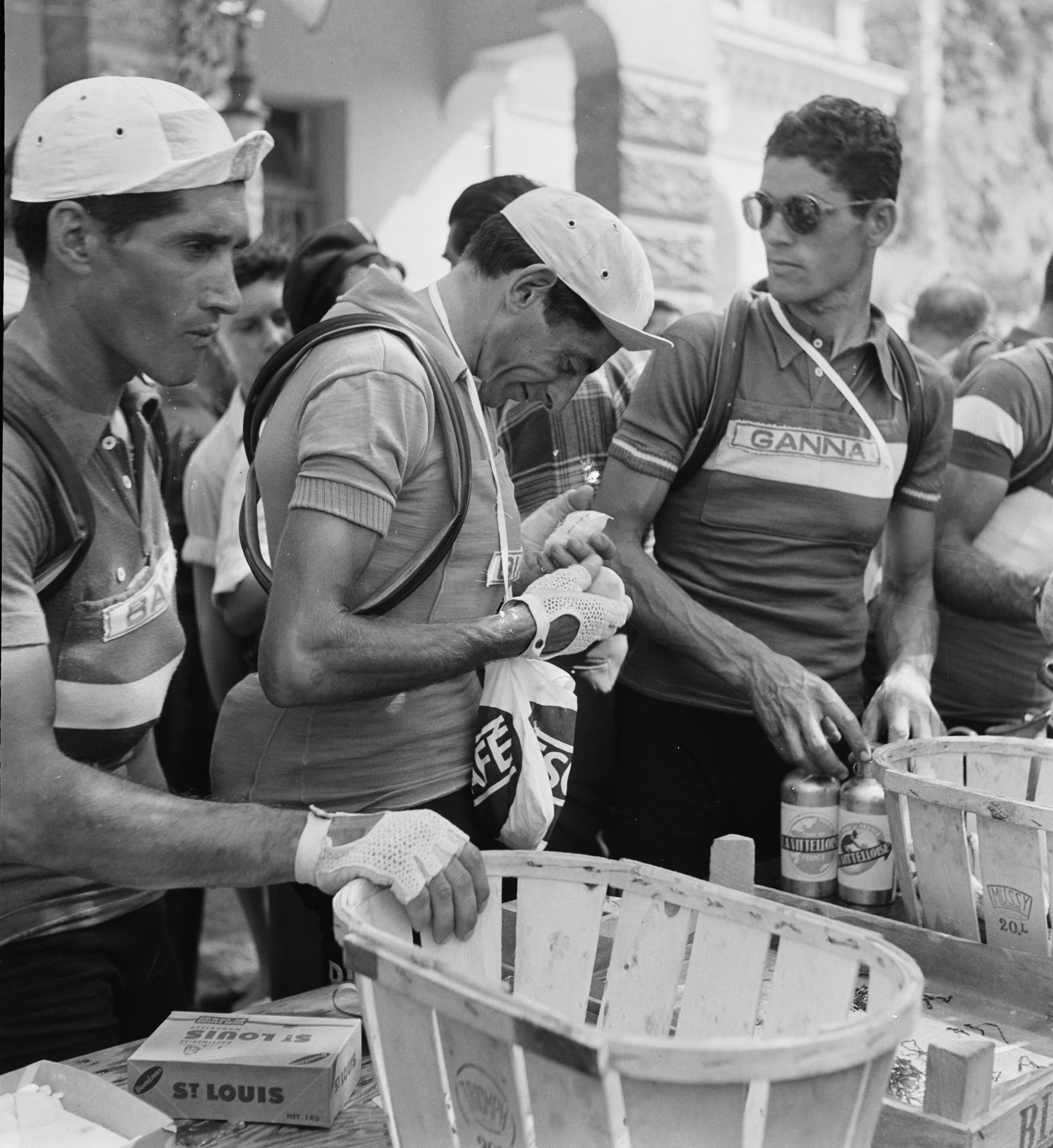
Coppi

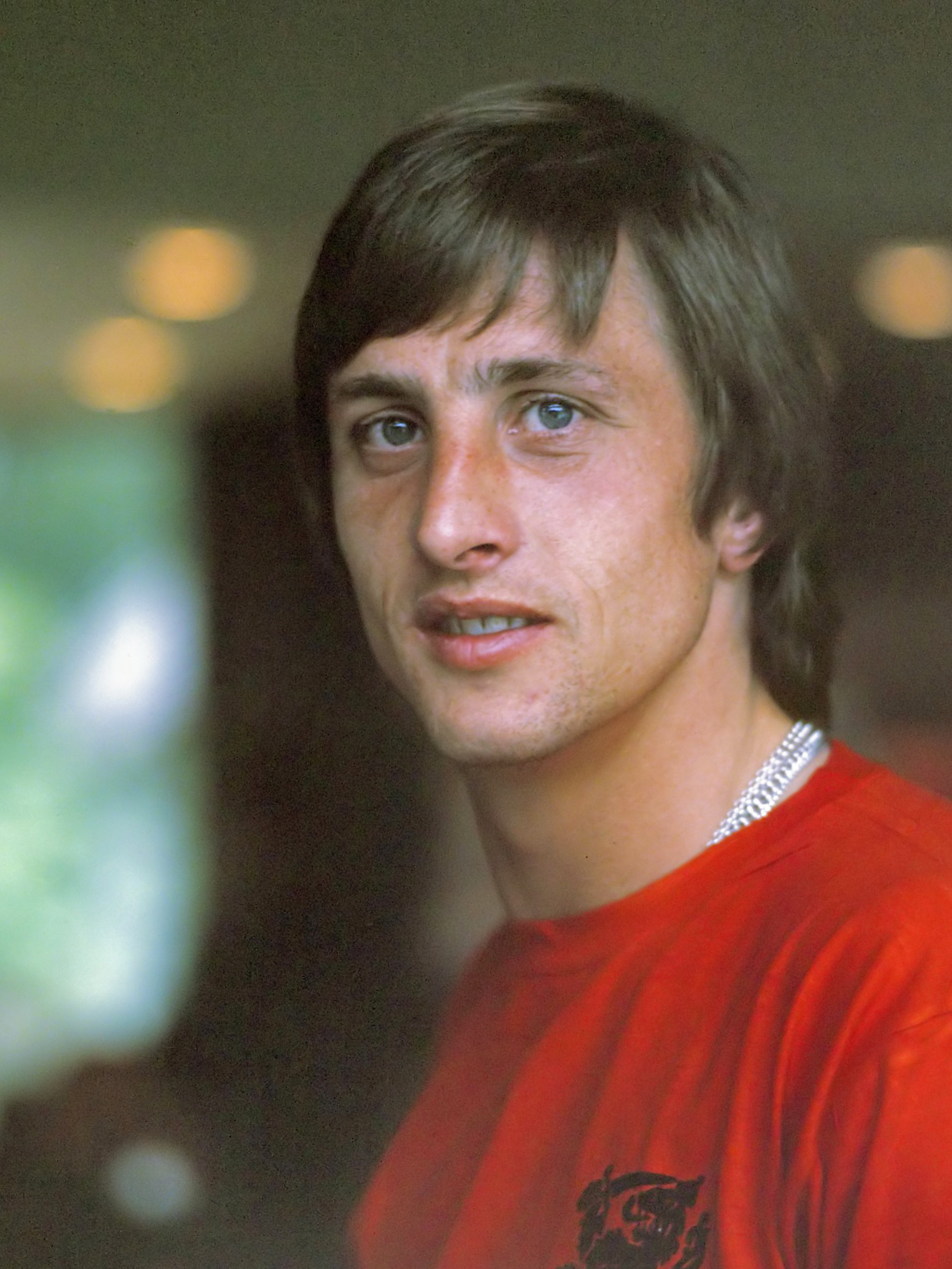
Cruyff

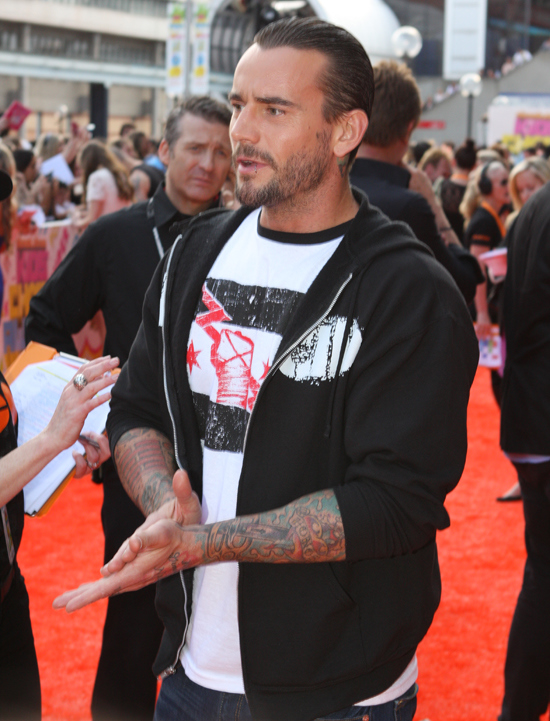
CM Punk

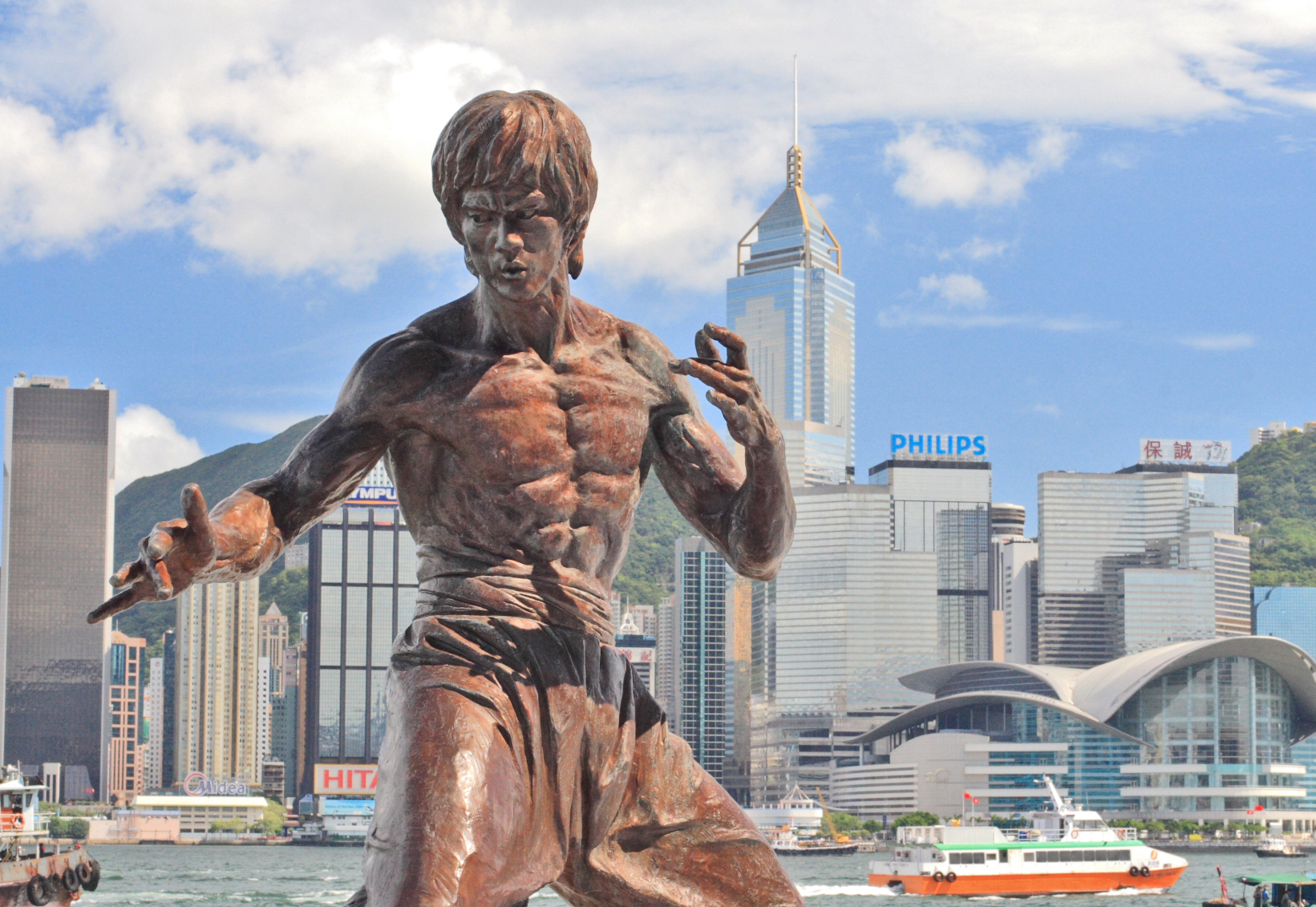
Lee

- Fernando Alonso (1981–): Formula One racer and two-time World Champion
- Ken Anderson (1976–): Professional wrestler, currently signed with TNA, where he wrestles under his ring name Mr. Anderson.
- Tom Budgen, (1985–): Professional wrestler, currently signed with WWE, where he wrestles under the ring name Aleister Black
- Lance Armstrong, (1971–): Road racing cyclist.
- Mikhail Botvinnik (1911–1995): Soviet and Russian International Grandmaster and three-time World Chess Champion, widely considered one of the greatest chess players of all time.
- Alvin Burke, Jr (1973–): American professional wrestler for WWE and formally for TNA. Converted to Islam when in jail, but has since described himself as a nonbeliever.
- Brian Clough, (1935–2004): Association football manager, of Hartlepool United, Derby County, Brighton & Hove Albion, Leeds United and Nottingham Forest. Said in his 1994 autobiography that he didn't believe in an afterlife or a god.
- Fausto Coppi (1919–1960): Italian racing cyclist, nicknamed Il Campionissimo ("the greatest champion") one of the most successful and popular cyclists of all time.
- Jim Cornette (1961–): American professional wrestling manager, commentator, promoter, and booker.
- Johan Cruyff (1947–2016): former Dutch footballer and manager for Ajax and Barcelona. He once quipped, "I don't believe in God, in Spain all 22 players cross themselves, if it works the game is always going to be a tie."
- Robin Dixon CBE (1935–): British Olympic gold medal bobsledder, army Major, businessman, British and Northern Irish politician, latterly a member of the House of Lords.
- Jan Hein Donner (1927–1988): Dutch chess grandmaster and writer.
- Jonathan Edwards (1966–): British triple jumper. Former Olympic, European and World champion. Holds the current world record in the event.
- Hugh Falkus (1917–1996): British writer, film maker, World War II pilot, but best known as an angler, with seminal books on salmon and sea trout fishing.
- David Feherty (1958–): Irish golfer, a former European Tour and PGA Tour professional who now works as a writer and broadcaster.
- Arian Isa Foster (1986–): Former American football running back for the Houston Texans and Miami Dolphins of the National Football League (NFL).
- Dan Fouts (1951–): Former NFL quarterback for the San Diego Chargers and current NFL color commentator.
- Jan Frodeno (1981–): German triathlete, 2008 Olympic gold medalist and two-times Ironman World Champion.
- Louis van Gaal (1951-) Dutch professional soccer manager and former player. He wrote in his autobiography: “When I lost Fernanda, it was then that I stopped believing in God and stopped being a Catholic.“This God did not respect the human being and the suffering of my wife. I want nothing to do with a God who lets people suffer this much.”
- Olga Galchenko (1990–): Juggler.
- Pep Guardiola (1971-) Spanish professional soccer manager and former player
- Alex Honnold (1985–) American rock climber known for his incredibly long and difficult free solo climbs.
- Bruce Lee (1940–1973): American born Chinese martial artist and actor.
- Zlatan Ibrahimović - Swedish former professional footballer of Bosnian and Croatian descent. In 2021 he said: "I don't believe in God, only in myself"
- Mike Mentzer (1951–2001): professional bodybuilder and 1979 Mr. Olympia heavyweight champion.
- Jason Miller (1980–): Popular American mixed martial arts fighter and host of MTV's Bully Beatdown. Is noted for stating "After my victory, I would like to thank science."
- Frank Mir (1979–): American mixed martial artist and broadcaster, former two-time UFC Heavyweight Champion.
- Riccardo Montolivo (1985–): Italian soccer player who has represented his country at the FIFA World Cup.
- Rafael Nadal (1986–): a Spanish professional tennis player.
- Diana Nyad (1949–): American world record long-distance swimmer, and the first person confirmed to swim from Cuba to Florida without the protection of a shark cage.
- Sarah Outen MBE FRGS (1985–): English adventurer, the first and only woman and the youngest person to row solo across the Indian Ocean.
- Lee Priest (1972–): Australian professional bodybuilder.
- CM Punk (1978–): American professional wrestler and former mixed martial artist.
- Seth Rollins (1986–): American professional wrestler.
- Aziz Shavershian (1989–2011): Australian bodybuilder and internet celebrity.
- Nigel Short (1965–): English chess grandmaster.
- Joe Simpson (1972–): British mountaineer, author and motivational speaker, famous for his book Touching the Void, subsequently filmed.
- Matthew Syed (1970–): English table tennis international, three times the Men's Singles Champion at the Commonwealth Table Tennis Championships and competing for Great Britain in two Olympic Games, now a Times journalist.
- Savielly Tartakower (1887–1956): Polish and French chess Grandmaster, the king of chess journalism in the 1920s and 1930s.
- Pat Tillman (1976–2004): Former NFL strong safety for the Arizona Cardinals and United States Army Ranger, killed by friendly fire in the mountains of Afghanistan.
- Dana White (1969–) President of Ultimate Fighting Championship
- Bob Woolmer (1948–2007): English international cricketer, professional cricket coach and commentator, playing in 19 Test matches and 6 One Day Internationals for England and later coaching South Africa, Warwickshire and Pakistan.

== Video games ==
- David Cage (1969–): French video game designer, writer and musician. He is the founder of the game development studio Quantic Dream. Cage both wrote and directed the video games Heavy Rain and Beyond: Two Souls for the PlayStation 3, and Detroit: Become Human for the PlayStation 4.
- John D. Carmack (1970–): American computer programmer, engineer, and businessman. He co-founded id Software. Carmack was the lead programmer of the id video games Commander Keen, Wolfenstein 3D, Doom, Quake, Rage and their sequels.
- Ken Levine (1966–): American game developer. He is the creative director and co-founder of Ghost Story Games (formerly known as Irrational Games). He led the creation of the BioShock series, and is also known for his work on Thief: The Dark Project and System Shock 2.

== Visual arts ==
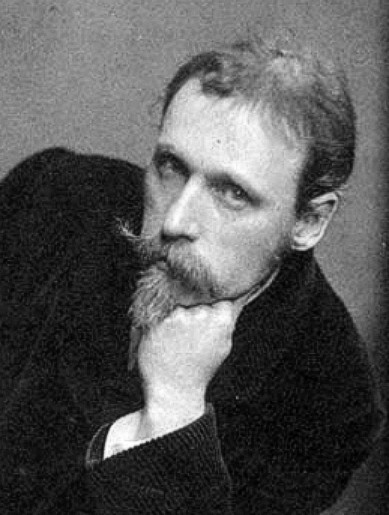
Crane

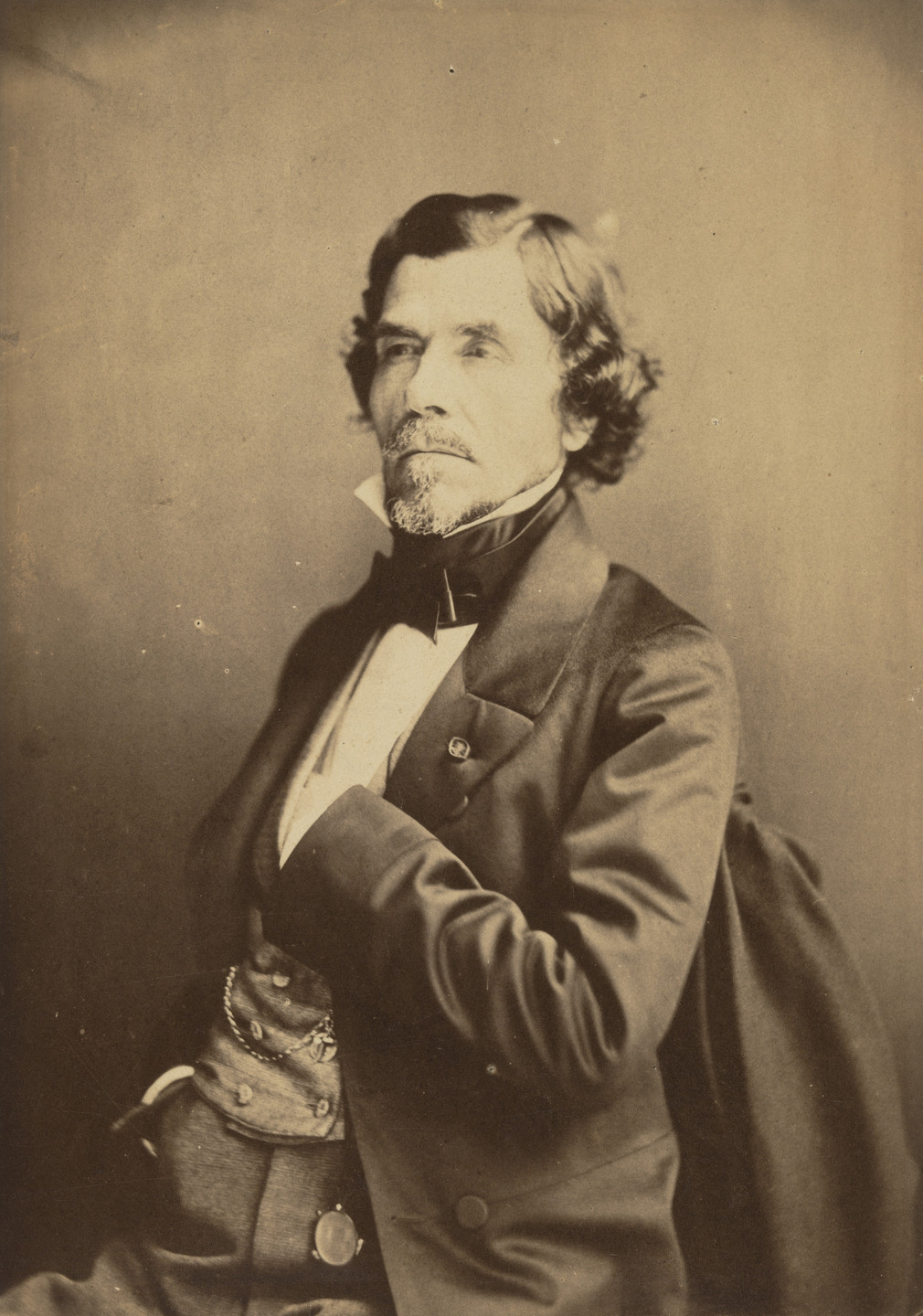
Delacroix

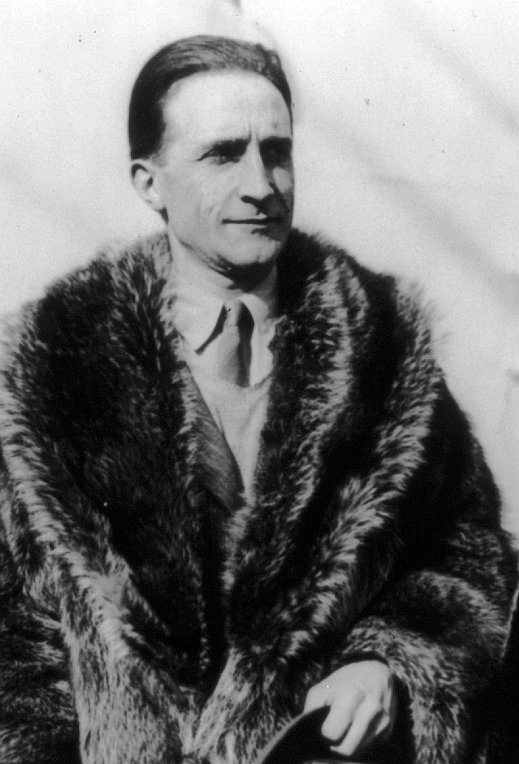
Duchamp

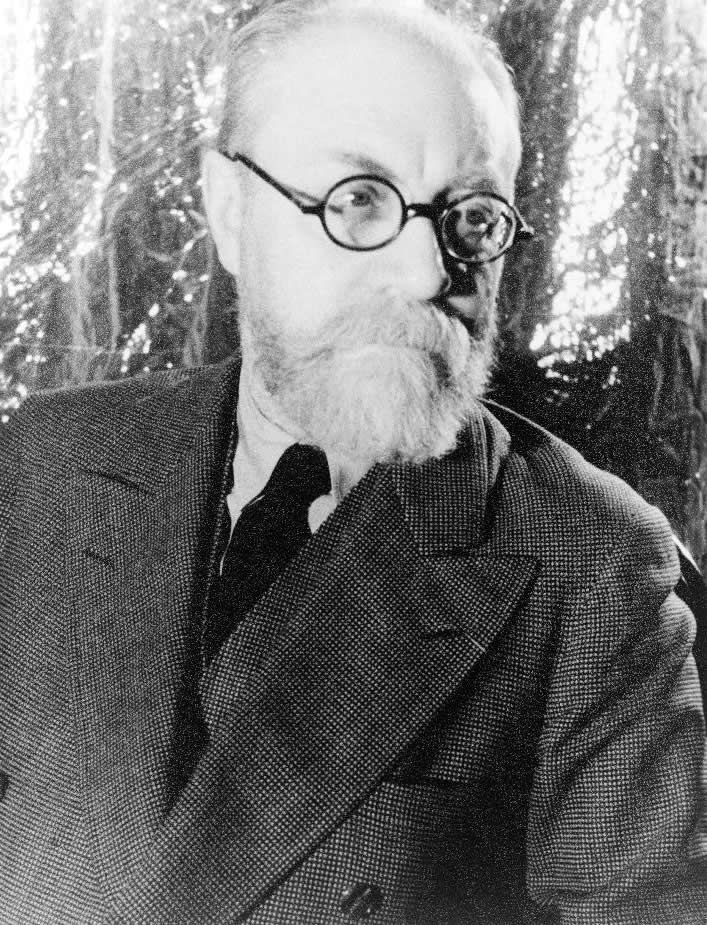
Matisse

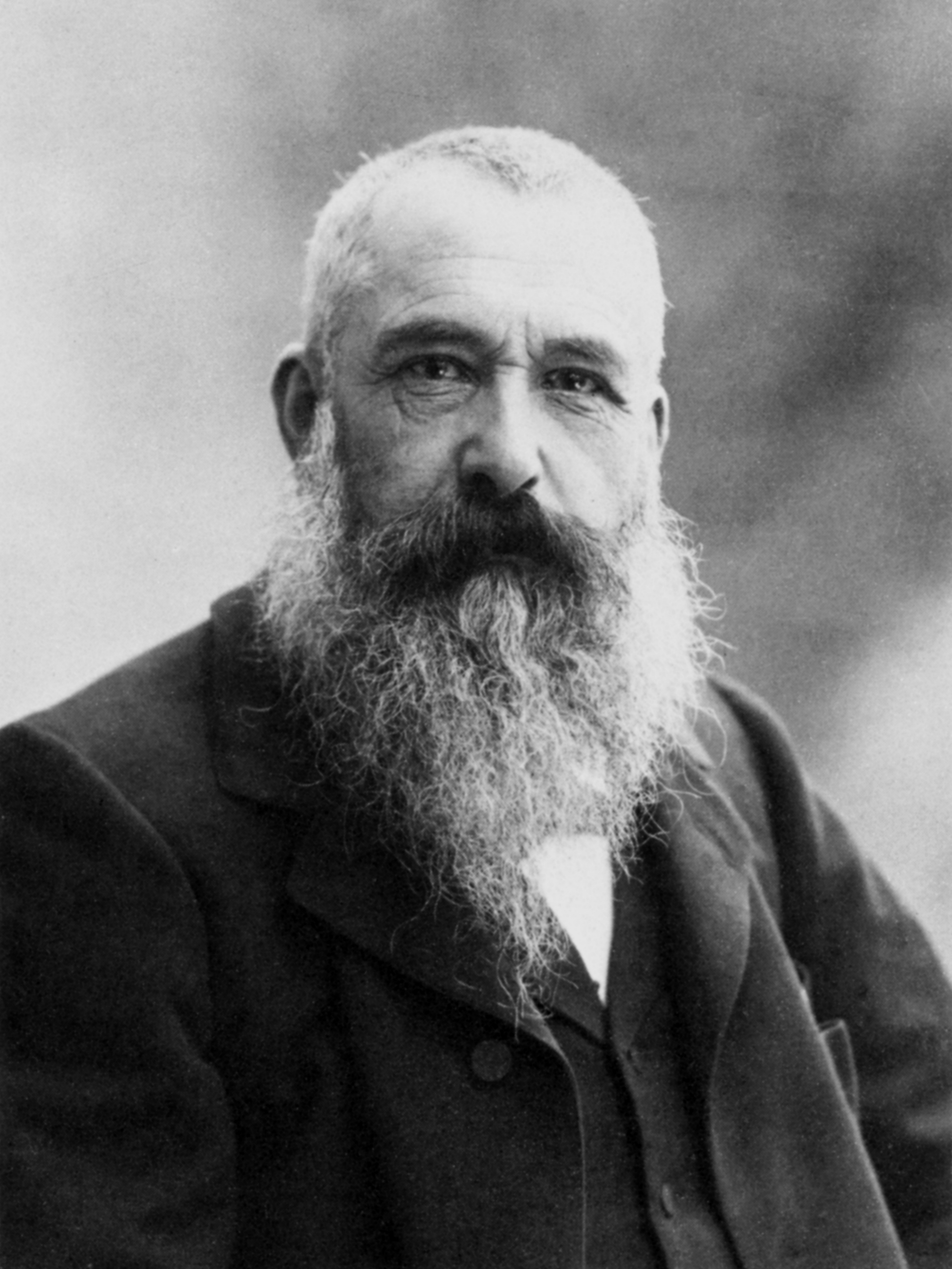
Monet

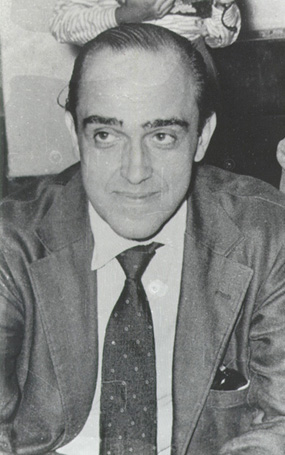
Niemeyer

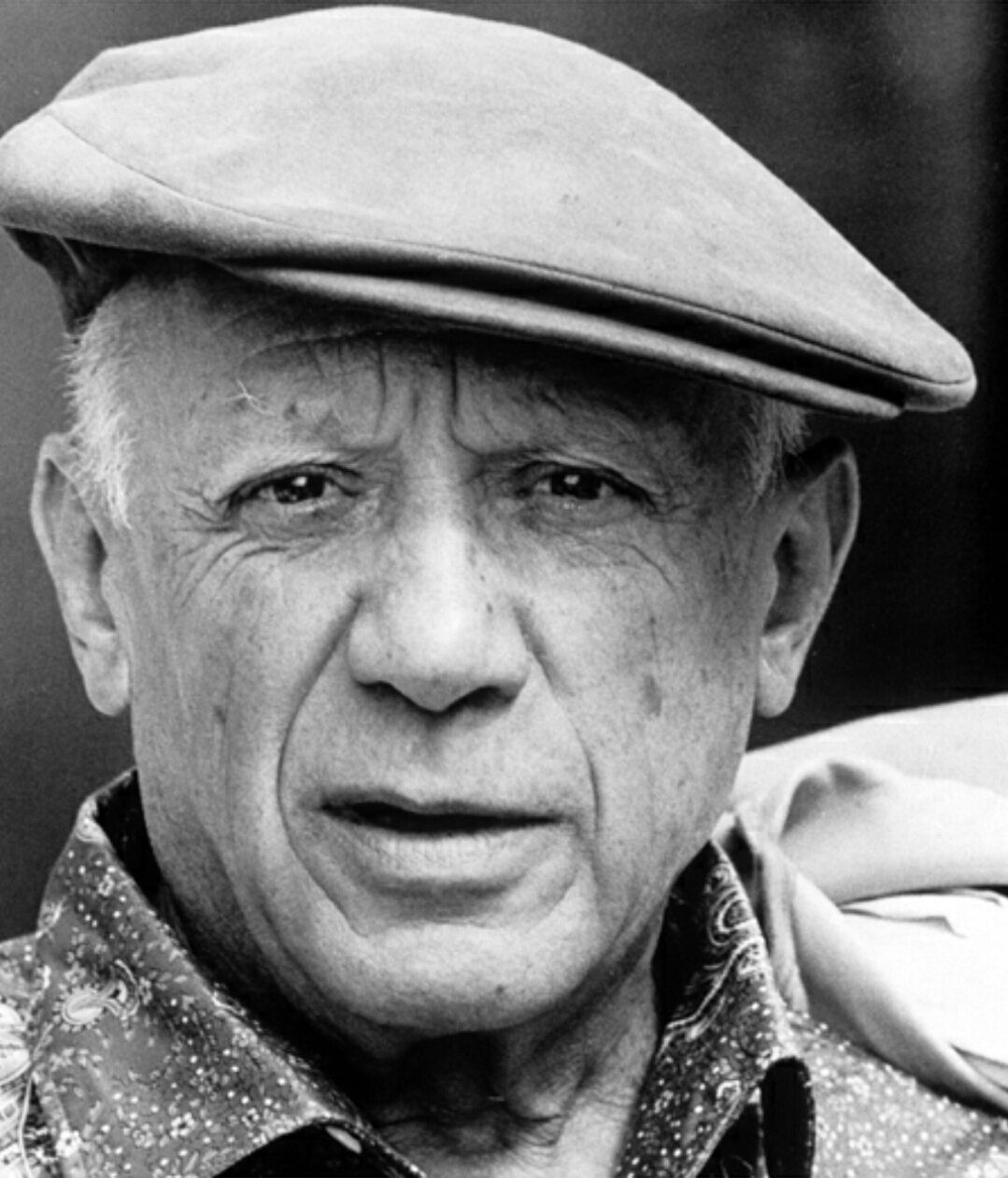
Picasso

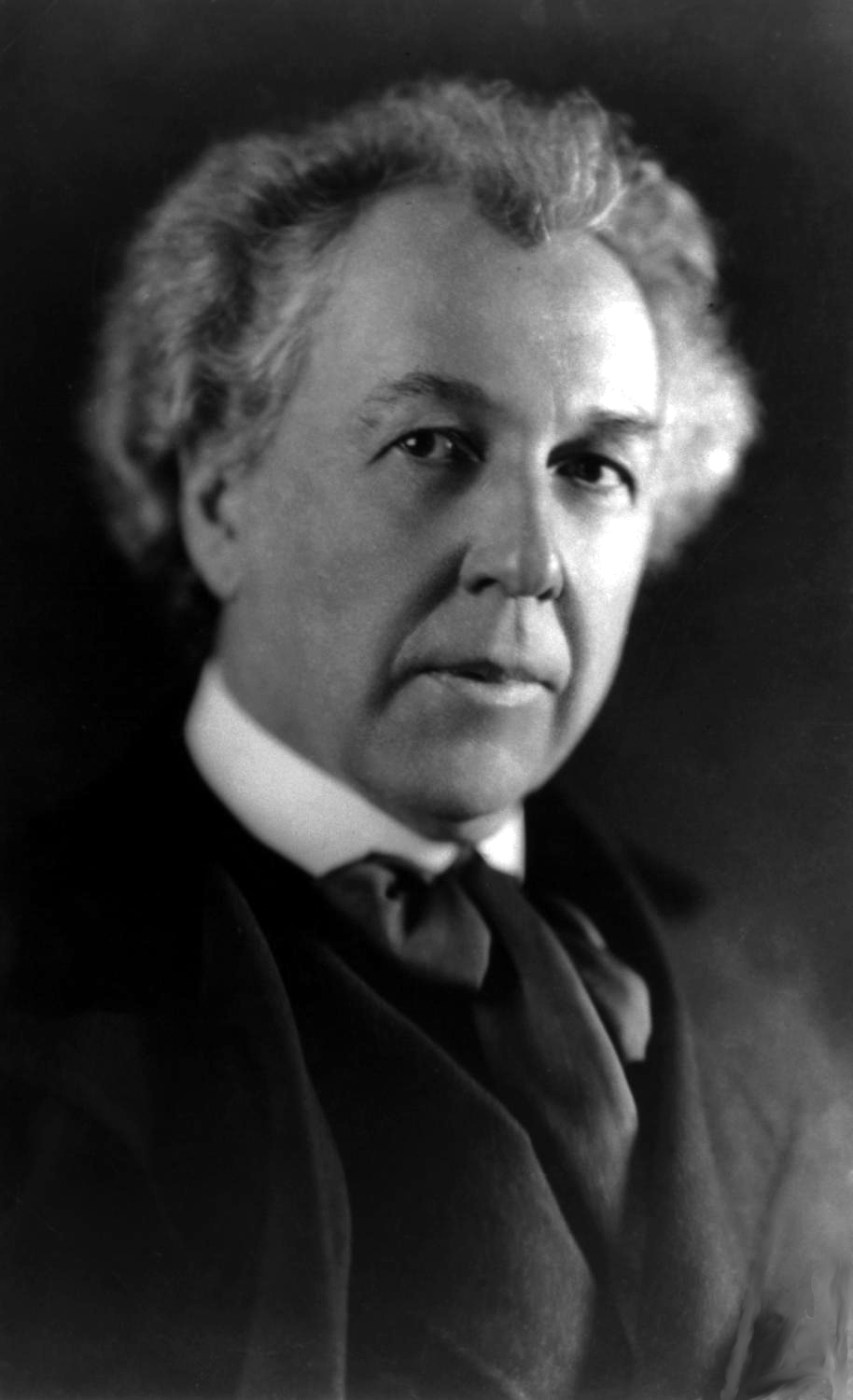
Wright

- Abu Abraham (1924–2002): Indian political cartoonist, journalist, and author.
- Franko B (1960–): British performance artist who uses his own body in his art.
- Francis Bacon (1909–1992): Irish-born figurative painter whose work is known for its bold, austere, and often grotesque or nightmarish imagery.
- Jemima Blackburn (1823–1909): Scottish painter and illustrator, especially of evocative images of rural life in 19th century Scotland.
- Iwona Blazwick OBE (1955–): British art gallery curator, Director of the Whitechapel Art Gallery in London.
- Berkeley Breathed (1957–): American cartoonist, children's book author/illustrator, director, and screenwriter, best known for the cartoon strip Bloom County.
- Joan Brossa (1919–1998): Catalan graphic designer and plastic artist, one of the leading early proponents of visual poetry in Catalan literature.
- Henri Cartier-Bresson (1908–2004): French photographer considered to be the father of modern photojournalism, an early adopter of 35 mm format, and the master of candid photography, who helped develop the influential "street photography" style.
- Mitch Clem (1982–): American cartoonist and webcomic author.
- Walter Crane (1845–1915): English artist and book illustrator, a main contributor to the child's nursery motif in English children's illustrated literature of the latter 19th century.
- Eric de Maré (1910–2002): British architectural photographer.
- Eugène Delacroix (1798–1863): French Romantic artist regarded from the outset of his career as the leader of the French Romantic school.
- Vincent Deporter (1959–): Writer/illustrator and cartoonist. Published in Europe (Spirou, Glenat, Dupuis...) and the United States (DC Comics, Nickelodeon Magazine...), and writer-illustrator for the SpongeBob Comics.
- Barry Driscoll (1926–2006): British painter, wildlife artist and sculptor.
- Marcel Duchamp (1887–1968): French artist whose work is most often associated with the Dadaist and Surrealist movements. Considered to be one of the most important artists of the 20th century.
- John Ernest (1922–1994): American-born artist, a key member of the British constructivist art movement.
- Ernst Ludwig Freud (1892–1970): German/Austrian architect, the youngest son of Sigmund Freud.
- Sam Fullbrook (1922–2004): Prize-winning Australian artist.
- Peter Fuller (1947–1990): British art critic and magazine editor, founding editor of the art magazine Modern Painters and art critic of The Sunday Telegraph.
- Sir Alfred Gilbert (1854–1934): English sculptor and goldsmith, central participant in the New Sculpture movement.
- Sir Ernst Gombrich OM, CBE (1909–2001): Austrian-born British art historian.
- Antony Gormley OBE, RA (1950–): English sculptor, famous for his Angel of the North.
- George Grosz (1893–1959): German draughtsman and painter, a prominent member of the Berlin Dada and New Objectivity group.
- Brion Gysin (1916–1986): British painter, writer, sound poet, and performance artist.
- Damien Hirst (1965–): English artist, internationally renowned and the most prominent member of the group known as "Young British Artists".
- Alfred Hrdlicka (1928–2009): Austrian sculptor, draughtsman, painter and artist, whose 2008 religious work about the Apostles, Religion, Flesh and Power, attracted criticism over its homoerotic theme.
- Mark Hofmann (1954–): Prolific counterfeiter and ex-Mormon who murdered two people in Salt Lake City, Utah.
- Sebastian Horsley (1962–2010): English artist and writer, best known for having undergone a voluntary crucifixion.
- Waldemar Januszczak (1954–): British art critic, former Guardian arts editor and maker of television arts documentaries.
- Charles-Édouard Jeanneret-Gris, known as Le Corbusier (1887–1965): Swiss-born architect, designer, urbanist, writer and also painter, famous for his contributions to what now is called Modern Architecture.
- Giulio Mancini (1558–1630): Italian biographer and writer on art, art collector and noted physician.
- Giacomo Manzù (1908–1991): Italian sculptor.
- Henri Matisse (1869–1954): French artist, known for his use of colour and his fluid and original draughtsmanship. He was a draughtsman, printmaker, and sculptor, but is known primarily as a painter. Matisse is commonly regarded, along with Picasso and Marcel Duchamp, as one of the three artists who helped to define the revolutionary developments in the plastic arts in the opening decades of the 20th century, responsible for significant developments in painting and sculpture.
- Alexander McQueen CBE (1969–2010): English fashion designer.
- Claude Monet (1840–1926): French painter. Best known as a founder of French impressionist painting.
- Sean Murphy: American comics writer/artist, known for his work on Hellblazer: City of Demons, Joe the Barbarian and American Vampire: Survival of the Fittest.
- Oscar Niemeyer (1907–2012): Brazilian architect, considered one of the most important names in international modern architecture.
- Jorge Oteiza (1908–2003): Basque sculptor, painter, designer and writer, renowned for being one of the main theorists on Basque modern art.
- Grayson Perry (1960–): English artist, best known for his ceramics and for cross-dressing, the first ceramic artist and public transvestite to win the Turner Prize.
- Pablo Picasso (1881–1973): Spanish painter, sculptor, printmaker, ceramicist, and stage designer. One of the greatest and most influential artists of the 20th century, he is widely known for co-founding the Cubist movement, the invention of constructed sculpture, the co-invention of collage, and for the wide variety of styles that he helped develop and explore.
- Gwen Raverat (1885–1957): English wood engraving artist who co-founded the Society of Wood Engravers in England.
- Gerhard Richter (1932–): German artist, considered one of the most important German artists of the post-World War II period.
- Bryan Robertson OBE (1925–2002): English curator and arts manager, "the greatest Director the Tate Gallery never had".
- Mark Rothko (1903–1970): Latvian-born American painter and printmaker, classified as an abstract expressionist, although he rejected the label.
- Martin Rowson (1959–): British political cartoonist, novelist and satirist.
- Maurice Sinet, known as Siné (1928–2016): French radical left-wing cartoonist.
- Brendan Powell Smith (19??–): American artist, author, and creator of The Brick Testament, which illustrates stories from the Bible by dioramas of LEGO bricks.
- "Normal" Bob Smith (1969–): American graphic artist, who prompted controversy with his creation of Jesus Dress Up.
- Kurt Westergaard (1935–2021): Danish cartoonist, creator of a controversial cartoon of the Muslim prophet Muhammad wearing a bomb as a turban which was part of the Jyllands-Posten Muhammad cartoons controversy.
- Frank Lloyd Wright (1867–1959): American architect, interior designer, writer and educator, who designed more than 1,000 structures and completed 500 works. Wright believed in designing structures which were in harmony with humanity and its environment, a philosophy he called organic architecture.
