= L2 Inc =

American research and business intelligence firm

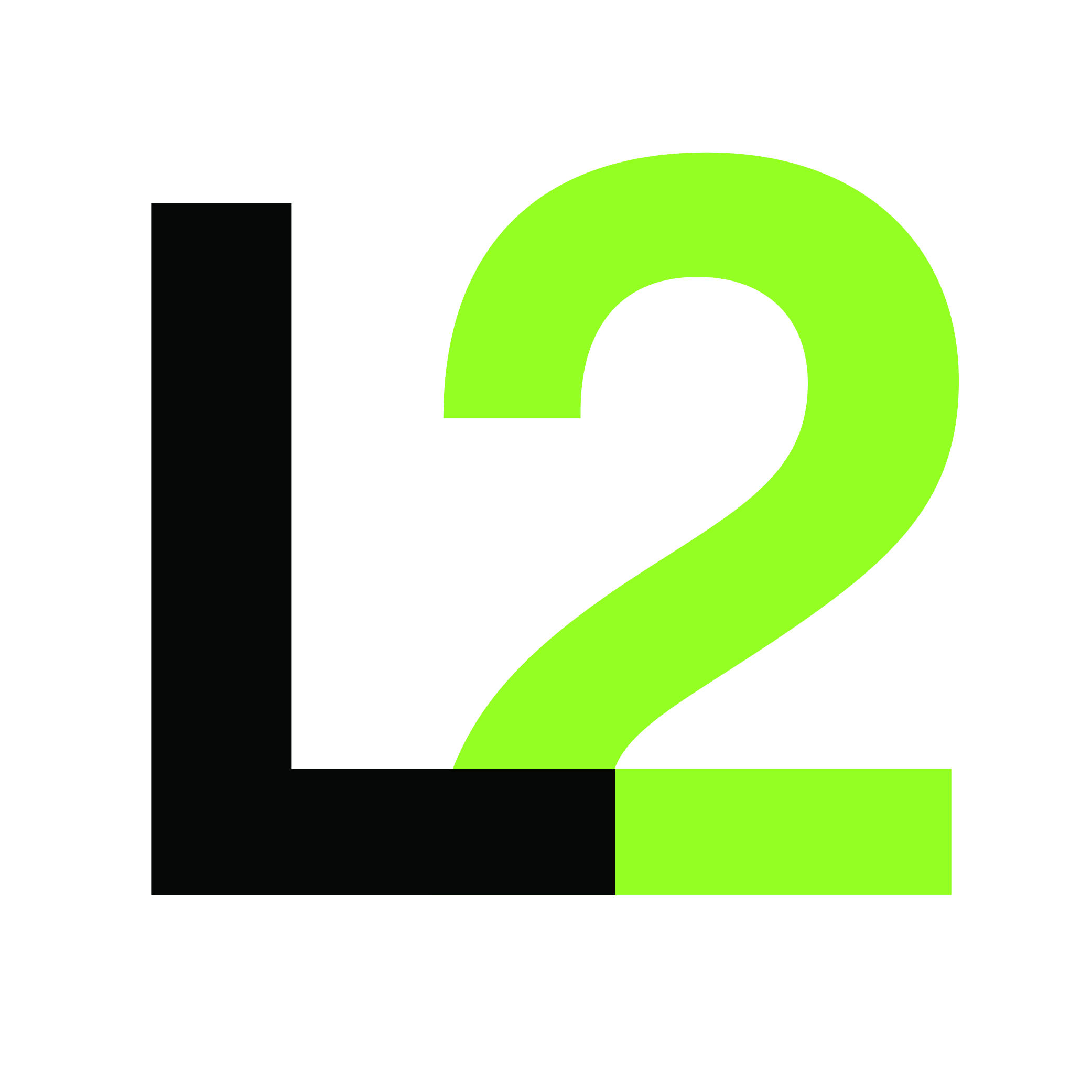
- Type: Subsidiary
- Founded: 2010
- Founder: Scott Galloway, Founder and Chairman
- Headquarters: New York City, USA
- Key people: Maureen Mullen, CSO and Co-Founder Kenneth Allard, CEO; Katherine Dillon, CCO Todd Benson, Board of Directors
- Products: Membership, Research
- Number of employees: 150 (New York City and London) (2017)
- Parent: Gartner
- Website: L2Inc.com

L2 Inc is a subscription research and business intelligence firm that benchmarks the digital competence of consumer brands. The company evaluates more than 2,200 brands annually, analyzing their website, e-commerce, digital marketing, social media, and mobile executions, and then ranks within each industry. The research L2 publishes is aimed at CMOs and senior-level digital marketing leaders to provide marketing strategy guidance.

== History ==
L2 was founded in New York City in 2010 by Scott Galloway, Clinical Professor of Marketing at NYU Stern School of Business. Ken Allard joined the firm as CEO in May 2015.

In 2010, the company rebranded as L2, and it has since expanded its research reach to cover Auto, Activewear, Beauty, Consumer Electronics, Consumer Packaged Goods, Fashion, Financial Services, Food & Drink, Hotels, Luxury, Retail and Watches & Jewelry across all access levels.

In March 2017, L2 entered into an agreement to be acquired by Gartner.

== Products and Membership ==
L2's chief products are their Digital IQ Index benchmarks, of which they publish 25+ per year, along with in-depth, trend-specific reports. The benchmarks analyze, index, and rank the digital competence of brands within their specific industries

The company has a membership-based business model, wherein only active members can access the reports.
