= Scott Galloway (professor) =

American marketing professor and podcaster (born 1964)

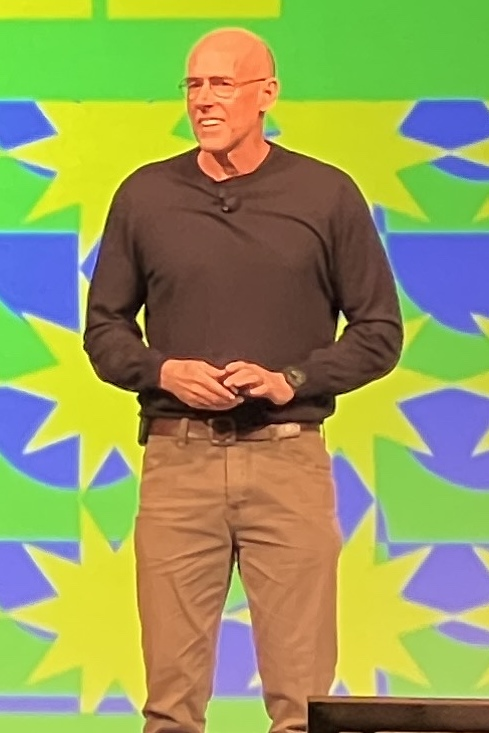
- Galloway in 2022
- Born: November 3, 1964 (age 62); San Diego, California, U.S.
- Education: University of California, Los Angeles (BA); University of California, Berkeley (MBA)
- Occupations: Professor, author, speaker, businessperson, entrepreneur
- Website: profgmedia.com

Scott Galloway (born November 3, 1964) is an American academic, author, podcast host, and entrepreneur.

He is professor of marketing at the New York University Stern School of Business.

== Early life and education ==
Galloway was born in San Diego and grew up in Los Angeles, California. His father was a Scottish immigrant to the United States who worked as a sales executive. His mother, a Jewish immigrant from London, England, worked as a secretary.

Following his graduation from the University of California, Los Angeles in 1987, Galloway worked as a fixed income analyst at Morgan Stanley. He then went on to earn his MBA from the Haas School of Business at UC Berkeley, graduating in 1992.

== Career ==
In 1992, he co-founded Prophet, a brand strategy consultancy, with a business school classmate.

In 1997, Galloway founded RedEnvelope, as 911Gifts.com, an e-commerce site specializing in expensive and monogrammed gifts, which designed many of its own products. The company went public in 2003, but declared bankruptcy in 2008.

In 1999, he was named to the World Economic Forum's "Global Leaders of Tomorrow", which recognized 100 people under the age of 40 "whose accomplishments have had impact on a global level".

In 2010, Galloway founded the business intelligence firm L2 Inc, which Gartner acquired on March 9, 2017, for $155 million. He also ran the hedge fund Firebrand Partners, which in 2007–2008 worked with Harbinger Capital to build an almost 20 percent stake in The New York Times Company, which won the group two board seats.

In 2019, he founded the executive-education startup Section (formerly Section4), which raised $30 million in Series A funding led by General Catalyst in 2021, bringing total funding to about $37 million.

Galloway has served on the board of directors of Eddie Bauer, The New York Times Company, Gateway Computer, Urban Outfitters, and UC Berkeley's Haas School of Business. He is also known for his public presentations, such as "Zero or One: Winners & Losers in a Digital Age", which he gave at the DLD conference in New York in 2014. At L2 he created the Digital IQ Index, which ranked prestige brands on their websites and e-commerce, mobile, social media and digital marketing.

Galloway teaches brand strategy and digital marketing to second-year MBA students. Much of his research concerns big tech, including Alphabet, Amazon, Meta, and Apple, which he refers to as "The Four" or "the Four Horsemen". His first book, The Four: The Hidden DNA of Amazon, Apple, Facebook, and Google, was released in 2017 and analyzes the big four's peculiar strengths and strategies, novel aspects of their economic models, tactics of expansion, as well as resulting social and individual consequences.

In 2018, Galloway and Kara Swisher launched Pivot, a weekly podcast on tech, business and politics in the Vox Media Podcast Network; it joined New York magazine in 2020.

Galloway also hosts The Prof G Show, a weekly podcast in which he answers listener questions on business, money, and technology.

On September 28, 2021, CNN announced that Galloway would host a show on its CNN+ streaming service. CNN+ shut down on April 30, 2022, a month after it launched.

In 2022, Galloway's weekly newsletter No Mercy/No Malice won both the Webby Award and the People's Voice Award in the business, news and technology email newsletter category.

In July 2026, Governor Gavin Newsom appointed Galloway to the Regents of the University of California; the appointment requires confirmation by the California State Senate.

== Positions ==
Since 2017, Galloway has repeatedly called for U.S. government antitrust intervention against the four consumer technology companies—Apple, Meta Platforms, Amazon, and Alphabet—in order to break them up. He advocated against Facebook's Libra cryptocurrency plans in July 2019, saying the company had shown "gross negligence" around user privacy.

In 2018 he set out the case for breaking up the companies in a long essay for Esquire, which James Pethokoukis of the American Enterprise Institute said was "not strong".

In November 2019, Galloway argued on CNN that Michael Bloomberg's 2020 presidential candidacy met the Democrats' need for a strong centrist candidate.

In December 2019, Galloway, a Twitter shareholder, wrote an open letter to Twitter's board calling for CEO Jack Dorsey to be replaced.

In February 2026, he launched "Resist and Unsubscribe", a campaign urging people to cancel subscriptions to large tech companies as an economic protest against Trump and his policies.

In September 2026, he argued that Israel was not committing genocide in Gaza.

In November 2026, Galloway called Elon Musk "a traitor to the West" on Pivot and The Prof G Pod, over reports that SpaceX had restricted Starlink service in Ukraine. He compared Musk to Julius and Ethel Rosenberg, saying "we took the Rosenbergs and put them up against a wall and executed them for being traitors". Theo Wold, a former Trump White House aide, called the comparison "ludicrous" and accused Galloway of "the endorsement of violence". At a live taping of Pivot at the Orpheum Theatre in Los Angeles that month, Galloway said he had sold his Tesla after Musk began posting about him on X, adding that he had first defecated in the passenger seat: "True story. Not good for resale value."

== Personal life ==
Galloway's wife, Beata, is a property developer from Germany whom he met at a hotel pool; he has written that it was the pool of the Raleigh Hotel in Miami Beach. She is 17 years his junior. They have two sons together. Galloway and his family moved to London in 2022.

Galloway is Jewish and has described himself as an atheist.

=== Philanthropy ===
In 2017, Galloway gave $4.4 million to UC Berkeley's Haas School of Business for fellowships for students from immigrant families, and also announced gifts to UCLA and NYU. In July 2024, he gave $12 million to the extension divisions of UCLA and UC Berkeley to set up the UC Excelerator program for non-traditional students.

== In popular culture ==
Galloway is played by Kelly AuCoin in the 2022 television miniseries WeCrashed. Galloway hosted the second season of the show's companion podcast; on it, co-creators Lee Eisenberg and Drew Crevello said his critical blog post about WeWork had been a "the Emperor has no clothes moment" for them. Galloway also has a voice cameo in the third season of The White Lotus.

== Bibliography ==
- Galloway, Scott (2017). The Four: The Hidden DNA of Amazon, Apple, Facebook, and Google. New York: Penguin. ISBN 978-0735213654. OCLC 973800907.
- Galloway, Scott (2019). The Algebra of Happiness: Notes on the Pursuit of Success, Love, and Meaning. New York: Penguin. OCLC 1099925490.
- Galloway, Scott (2020). Post Corona: From Crisis to Opportunity. New York: Penguin. ISBN 9780593332214. OCLC 1194869826.
- Galloway, Scott (2022). Adrift: America in 100 Charts. New York: Penguin. ISBN 9780593542408. OCLC 1344433124.
- Galloway, Scott (2024). The Algebra of Wealth: A Simple Formula for Financial Security. New York: Penguin. ISBN 9780593714027. OCLC 1398511233.
- Galloway, Scott (2025). Notes on Being a Man. New York: Simon & Schuster. ISBN 9781668084359. OCLC 1546971346.

== See also ==
- L2
- Prophet
- List of business and finance podcasts
- List of atheists (miscellaneous): Business
