= Disprz =

Indian software company

- Type: Private
- Industry: SaaS
- Founded: 2015; 11 years ago
- Founder: Subramanian Viswanathan, Kuljit Chadha
- Headquarters: Chennai, India
- Area served: worldwide
- Services: Learning Management System
- Number of employees: 200+ (2025)
- Website: disprz.ai

Disprz is a SaaS company offering an AI-powered learning and skilling platform for enterprises. Founded in 2015, it was originally launched as Learntron before rebranding to align with its focus on workforce capability building. Headquartered in Chennai, India, Disprz combines the features of an LMS, LXP, and skill analytics.

== History ==
Disprz was founded in 2015 under the name Learntron. The company focused on serving online learning providers and enterprises in its early years. In 2017, it secured $370,000 in seed funding, followed by a $2 million Series A round in 2018 to further develop its platform.

As the company shifted its focus to scalable enterprise learning and skill development, it rebranded to Disprz.

From 2015 to 2020, Disprz grew alongside the rising adoption of MOOCs and mobile-first learning. The company introduced skills-based learning services in emerging markets, developing the Learning Experience Platform (LXP) category.

In 2020, Disprz won in the Atma Nirbhar Bharat App Innovation Challenge under the eLearning category. The COVID-19 pandemic helped Disprz and led to a $13 million Series B funding round in 2021. In 2022, the company was recognized as EdTech Startup of the Year by Entrepreneur India Magazine.

In 2023, Disprz raised $30 million in Series C funding to support global expansion and evolve into a comprehensive people intelligence suite. In 2025, Disprz integrated generative AI throughout its platform—enhancing content creation, assessments, and skill discovery —and was recognized as a Leader by G2 across multiple corporate learning categories.

=== Reviews ===
The company also received 4.7 on Capterra, GetApp, and Software Advice. It got 4.9 from Gartner Peer Insights.

=== Operations ===
Disprz is a generative AI-powered platform for workforce learning, offering an LMS, LXP, AI content tools, people intelligence, and custom assessments.
