= DataDome =

Cybersecurity company

DataDome is a cybersecurity vendor that specializes in bot management, agent trust management, and online fraud prevention services. Founded in 2015, it provides protection against automated threats for websites, mobile applications, APIs and MCP servers.

== History ==
DataDome was founded in 2015 by Benjamin Fabre and Fabien Grenier. The company is headquartered in New York City.

In 2017, the company secured €2.5 million in funding led by ISAI and 50 Partners Capital. In 2021, DataDome raised $35 million in Series B funding led by Elephant. In 2023, the company raised $42 million in Series C funding led by InfraVia Growth.

In 2024, the company also launched Ad Protect and Account Protect.

In May 2026 it launched Priority Protect, a virtual waiting room that manages traffic surges during peak demand with real-time fraud detection. It filters out bots and unauthorized AI agents and prioritize real customers and approved agents. Also in 2026, Forrester Research named DataDome a Leader in The Forrester Wave: Bot and Agent Trust Management Software, Q2 2026 and Gartner listed the company as a sample vendor for AI agent bot management in its Hype Cycle for Application Security.

== Technology and research ==
DataDome's platform uses machine learning and behavioral analysis to identify automated traffic. The system evaluates requests using factors including IP reputation, device fingerprinting, and user behavior patterns. Its applications include the detection and mitigation of credential stuffing and distributed denial-of-service (DDoS) attacks. The integrates with cloud providers including Amazon Web Services and Google Cloud.

The company also conducts investigations and research into automated online activity, bot traffic, and related cybersecurity threats.
