= G2 (company) =

Peer-to-peer review site

- Website type: Private company
- Founded: 2012; 14 years ago
- Headquarters: Chicago, Illinois; United States
- Founders: Godard Abel; Tim Handorf; Mike Wheeler; Matt Gorniak; Mark Myers
- Key people: Godard Abel (CEO); Tim Handorf (co-founder, Head of Product); Alex Bradley (CFO); Alexis Zheng (Chief Product & Technology Officer); Eric Gilpin (President, GTM); Alex London (CMO)
- Industry: Internet, Research, B2B, SaaS, Services
- Products: Reviews
- Employees: 575 (2022)
- Website: www.g2.com

G2 (formerly G2 Crowd) is an American technology company headquartered in Chicago, operating an online marketplace and review platform for business software and services. Founded in 2012, it aggregates user-generated reviews and provides market-intelligence products for software buyers and vendors. In 2026, G2 acquired the review platforms Capterra, Software Advice, and GetApp from Gartner.

== History ==
In 2012, five former employees of BigMachines – Tim Handorf, Godard Abel, Matt Gorniak, Mark Myers and Mike Wheeler – founded G2, with Abel serving as president. The company focused on aggregating user reviews for business software and was known as G2 Labs, Inc. until 2013.

A beta version of the review site launched in December 2012, with several thousand users testing the service before its full launch in 2013.

When Abel left to continue building Steelbrick with Salesforce, Handorf took over as CEO.

In 2014, G2 raised $2.3 million in seed funding from investors, including Chicago Ventures, Hyde Park Venture Partners, Andrew Filipowski, and Greg Jones, founding CEO of uBid. In 2015, G2 raised an additional $7 million in Series A funding led by Pritzker Group Venture Capital. Investors included 2014's contributors in addition to co-founder Godard Abel, Thomas Lehrman, and Scott Dorsey. G2 announced it would use these funds to invest in its leadership and capabilities.

In January 2016, G2 reported more than 400,000 sessions per month, and included more than 400 product categories.

In 2017, G2 secured a $30 million Series B, led by VC Accel with participation from LinkedIn and the company's founders. The funds were used to help the company expand into services.

Abel returned to G2 as executive chairman in 2017. In early 2018, G2 Cofounders Godard Abel and Matt Gorniak returned to the company as its CEO and CRO, respectively.

In May 2019, G2 acquired Advocately, a B2B customer advocacy platform, with the aim of amplifying customer voices and accelerating review collection.

In 2021, G2 reached a $1.1 billion valuation with a $157 million Series D funding. The Series D funding brought G2's total funding to $257 million and put G2 on the list of Unicorn startups that are valued at over $1 billion.

In June 2025, G2 acquired unSurvey, a Y Combinator–backed startup whose platform conducts AI-moderated conversational interviews; its founding team joined G2's product and AI teams.

In January 2026, G2 announced that it had reached an agreement to acquire marketplace and review platforms Capterra, Software Advice, and GetApp from research company Gartner for an undisclosed amount. The acquisition closed on February 5, 2026, for approximately $110 million.

== Products and services ==
Platform users can sign in with a LinkedIn account, Google account, or business email and can review the products they use. To encourage reviewers to participate, some users are incentivized by G2.com with gift cards, contest rewards and reputation points on the website. G2 attempts to identify fraudulent user reviews, including those by employees at companies reviewing their own products and employees at companies reviewing their competitors' products. G2 has also requested screenshots of the reviewer using the product for verification purposes. In 2013, the service was described by ZDNet as a competitor to Gartner's magic quadrant review model. Reviews that are accepted and published by G2 are publicly available. Users can filter information provided by reviewers based on company size, user role and user industry.

Beyond its review marketplace, G2 sells marketing and data products to the software vendors listed on its platform. In 2025, it partnered with the AI-search analytics company Profound to launch an AI Visibility dashboard, which lets vendors measure how often G2 is cited as a source by large language models and AI search tools, as part of a move into answer engine optimization (AEO). In October 2025, G2 partnered with Reddit to let software brands listed on G2 claim Reddit Pro business accounts pre-populated with their G2 profile and review data.

== Research ==
G2 publishes periodic research on business software buying. Its 2025 Buyer Behavior Report highlighted the increasing influence of AI on software purchasing decisions, and a 2025 report on AI agents described their growing adoption by businesses. A 2026 report, The Answer Economy: How AI Search Is Rewiring B2B Software Buying, found that 51% of B2B software buyers begin their research with AI chatbots.

== Awards ==
In 2018, G2 was ranked 179 on the Inc. Magazine "Fastest Growing Companies" list.

== See also ==
- Capterra
- Nubera
- Software Advice
- Review site
