= RemotePC =

- Developer: IDrive Inc..
- Stable release: 7.6.83 / 30 August 2024; 23 months ago
- Operating system: Windows; Linux; OS X Android iOS
- Type: Remote desktop software
- License: Proprietary
- Website: www.remotepc.com

RemotePC is a remote access and remote control software application, developed and owned by IDrive Inc., a software company based in Calabasas, California, United States. Its core function is in enabling remote access and maintenance to computers and other devices.

== Overview ==
RemotePC software was created by the team of IDrive Inc., a private technology company based in Calabasas, California. The app was specifically developed for remote communication and control functions, including text chat, voice, RemotePC Meeting, interactive annotation and more.

Remote PC software has been discussed and cited in the technology reviews and by the multiple industry outlets such as Software Advice, Capterra, GetApp (Gartner's subsidiary), TechRadar and PCMag, among others. The application's use accelerated in 2020 and 2021 as the demand for remote work, learning and communication grew during the COVID-19 pandemic.

== Technology and functionality ==
It doesn't require any special software for installation and can be accessed directly via the web. RemotePC is compatible with PCs and Macs and Linux systems, and has mobile applications for iOS and Android devices. Its main functions include RemotePC Consumer and SoHo, RemotePC Team, RemotePC Enterprise, RemotePC HelpDesk, RemotePC Meeting and RemotePC ScreenShare.

== See also ==
- Comparison of remote desktop software
