= Bradford Cohen =

American lawyer

- Born: Bradford M. Cohen
- Education: Nova Southeastern Shepard Broad Law School (JD)
- Occupations: Lawyer; legal analyst
- Political party: Independent
- Website: https://www.cohenandmcmullen.com/

Bradford M. Cohen is an American criminal defense lawyer, civil litigator, and legal analyst.

== Career ==
Cohen graduated from Nova Southeastern University Shepard Broad College of Law and has been a member of the Florida Bar since 1997. He is a past president of the Broward County Association of Criminal Defense Lawyers.

In 2004, Cohen appeared on NBC’s The Apprentice during its second season and was "fired" by Donald Trump.

Cohen has represented several high-profile individuals in criminal cases, including rapper Vanilla Ice, whose grand theft charge was dismissed. In January 2021, Cohen represented rappers Lil Wayne and Kodak Black in seeking federal clemency from President Donald Trump. He advocated for a presidential pardon for Lil Wayne on a firearms conviction and for the commutation of Kodak Black's sentence on a firearms offense. Both were granted clemency.

Cohen was involved in the formation of Trump Media & Technology Group, serving as an investor and legal adviser to President Trump. He received a 1.4% ownership stake in the company.

In 2023, Cohen represented Nima Momeni, who was accused of first-degree murder of Bob Lee, a tech entrepreneur, in San Francisco, California. After a seven-week trial and seven days of deliberation, the jury convicted Momeni of second-degree murder.

In February 2023, Cohen represented Drake in connection with a subpoena issued during the XXXTentacion murder trial. After Cohen argued that Drake had no relevant knowledge of the case, the court granted the motion to quash the subpoena, and Drake was not required to sit for a deposition.

In October 2025, Cohen represented rapper Pooh Shiesty, who was released from federal prison after a three-year incarceration.
