= The Analyst (disambiguation) =

The Analyst is a book by George Berkeley

The Analyst may also refer to:

- The Analyst, former title of the chemical journal Analyst, published by the Royal Society of Chemistry
- The Analyst, or, Mathematical Museum, a mathematics journal
- The Analyst, the first name of the Annals of Mathematics, a mathematics journal
- The Analyst (newspaper), a newspaper in Liberia
- The Analyst (novel), a novel by John Katzenbach
- "The Analyst", a song on the album Mistaken Identity by Delta Goodrem

== See also ==
- Analyst (disambiguation)
