= EventMobi =

Event management software

- Type: Private
- Industry: Event technology, Software
- Founded: 2010 in Toronto, Canada
- Founders: Bob Vaez; Bijan Vaez
- Headquarters: Toronto, Ontario, Canada
- Key people: Bob Vaez (CEO); Vander Guerrero (COO); Joshua Auslander (CFO); Salman Sayany (VP Engineering & Product)
- Products: EventMobi event platform (including registration, mobile app, virtual events, analytics)
- Website: eventmobi.com

EventMobi (legal name 5Touch Solutions, Inc.) is a Canadian software company in the event technology industry, providing a cloud-based platform for planning and managing meetings and conferences. Its software-as-a-service (SaaS) platform enables event organizers to create event websites, handle online registration and check-in, and deploy mobile event apps with interactive engagement tools for attendees.

EventMobi was founded in 2010 by brothers Bob Vaez and Bijan Vaez in Toronto. Initially launched as a mobile app to replace printed event guidebooks, it later expanded to support virtual and hybrid events in addition to in-person gatherings. The company remains privately owned and largely bootstrapped (having grown without venture capital).

It has also expanded its offerings through acquisitions—notably the purchase of virtual event platform Run The World in 2023—and has received several industry awards for its products and workplace culture.

== History ==
EventMobi’s prototype was developed by Bob Vaez in 2009 as a side project while he was working as an engineer and attending business school. Frustrated with "bulky show guides" at conferences, he envisioned a mobile app to improve the event experience. The company was formally established in Toronto in 2010 by Bob Vaez and his brother Bijan Vaez.

In its early years, EventMobi’s mobile app gained adoption as an interactive guide for conferences and trade shows, allowing attendees to view schedules on their phones and participate in live polls or Q&A sessions. By the mid-2010s, the company had evolved from a single-purpose event app into a broader event management platform by adding features such as online registration, networking tools, and data analytics for event organizers.

EventMobi did not take on venture capital funding; it grew as a bootstrapped business by reinvesting its own revenues into product development and expansion. During this period of growth, EventMobi expanded its team and global presence. It opened a European office in Berlin and grew to over 80 employees by 2016 to support an international client base. Notable companies and organizations such as Visa, Ben & Jerry’s, Yale University, Porsche, Shoppers Drug Mart, and TD Bank were among its early customers by the late 2010s.

Co-founder Bijan Vaez served as Chief Technology Officer (CTO) before later transitioning to an advisory role, while Bob Vaez became the public face of the company as president and chief executive officer (CEO).

The COVID-19 pandemic in 2020 heavily impacted the events industry, shifting demand toward virtual formats. In response, EventMobi accelerated development of its virtual event capabilities. In May 2020, the company launched a new "Virtual Event Space" feature as part of its platform, enabling clients to live-stream conference sessions, host online discussions, and facilitate remote attendee engagement for virtual or hybrid events. This pivot helped EventMobi support its customer base through the pandemic lockdown period when in-person gatherings were on hold.

As physical conferences began to resume by 2022–2023, EventMobi placed emphasis on supporting "hybrid events" that combine live in-person and online elements, reflecting a broader industry trend toward blended event experiences.

== Products and services ==
EventMobi offers an event management software platform designed for organizing in-person, virtual, and hybrid events. Key products and features of the platform include:

- Event registration and ticketing: Tools for building event websites, online registration forms, and payment processing for ticketed events. Organizers can manage attendee lists and use EventMobi’s check-in system for on-site badge printing and entry control.
- Mobile event app: A customizable mobile and web-based application that provides attendees with digital agendas, speaker profiles, venue maps, and personalized schedules. The app enables real-time interaction features such as live Q&A, polls, surveys, and gamification to increase attendee engagement. Attendees can also network through built-in messaging and digital business card exchanges.
- Virtual event environment: An integrated virtual event platform supporting live-streamed presentations, webinars, virtual exhibitor booths, and online networking. Introduced in 2020, these capabilities allow event organizers to host fully online conferences or add remote components to hybrid events. Within a branded web portal, organizers can stream keynote sessions, run interactive breakout sessions, and facilitate sponsor expos for remote participants.
- Attendee engagement and analytics: A suite of engagement tools (live polls, feedback forms, games, and contests) is included to help boost participation. Event organizers have access to real-time analytics dashboards to track metrics like session attendance, poll results, exhibitor lead retrieval, and other data to measure event success and return on investment (ROI).

The EventMobi platform is modular, meaning clients can choose which components they need for a given event and all data is synchronized across the system. For example, an organizer might use EventMobi’s registration system together with the mobile app for an in-person conference or deploy the virtual event space for an online webinar series, with attendee profiles and content shared across modules.

In addition to the software, EventMobi provides professional services such as training, technical support, and custom development for clients with specialized requirements.

== Acquisitions and partnerships ==
EventMobi has expanded its technology offerings in part through strategic acquisitions.

In May 2013, the company made its first acquisition by purchasing Understoodit, a Toronto-based startup that had developed a live audience response and polling tool for use in classrooms. EventMobi integrated Understoodit’s real-time polling and feedback technology into its own platform to enhance live Q&A and audience interaction features. (The terms of the Understoodit deal were not publicly disclosed.)

A decade later, in August 2023, EventMobi announced the acquisition of Run The World, a Silicon Valley-based virtual events platform. Run The World—founded in 2019—had grown during the pandemic by enabling online conferences and networking events, and had attracted over $15 million USD in venture capital from investors including Andreessen Horowitz and Founders Fund. EventMobi’s purchase of Run The World was its second-ever acquisition (and first since 2013).

The deal was intended to bolster EventMobi’s capabilities in the virtual event space and bring in a large new user base. Run The World’s platform had powered more than 50,000 virtual events worldwide for clients such as Forbes, Meta (Facebook), Amazon, and Harvard University. EventMobi stated that by joining forces, it could offer Run The World’s customers a comprehensive hybrid event solution and year-round community engagement tools as part of the EventMobi suite. The 2023 acquisition underscored a trend of consolidation in the event-tech sector as companies adapted to post-pandemic market conditions.

In addition to acquisitions, EventMobi pursues partnerships and integrations to enhance its platform and market reach. For example, in 2019 EventMobi formed an integration with Swoogo, a provider of event registration software, allowing client data (such as attendee information and agendas) to sync between Swoogo’s system and the EventMobi app.

EventMobi has also collaborated with industry associations and conference organizers on various events. In one case, the Northwest Event Show (a trade show in the U.S. Pacific Northwest) selected EventMobi as its official event app and community platform for the 2024 edition of the conference. Such partnerships typically involve technical integration as well as co-marketing or content collaborations.

== Recognition ==
EventMobi and its products have earned several industry awards and honors, including:

- Industry Innovator (2014): EventMobi CEO Bob Vaez was inducted into the Meetings & Incentive Travel magazine Hall of Fame as an “Industry Innovator” in 2014, recognizing the company's early impact in replacing traditional paper event guides with a mobile platform.
- Best Event App (2015): EventMobi was voted "Reader's Choice: Best Event App" in 2015 by Meetings & Incentive Travel magazine's readership.
- Employer of the Year (2015): At the Canadian Startup Awards (hosted by Techvibes/BetaKit), EventMobi won the 2015 Employer of the Year award, an honor recognizing the company's workplace culture and growth. (EventMobi had doubled its staff for several years in a row during this period.)
- Canada's Top 100 SME Employers (2018): EventMobi was named one of Canada's Top 100 Small & Medium Employers in 2018 and was also listed that year on the Great Place to Work Institute's roll of Best Workplaces in Canada.
- Best Event App – Event Technology Awards (2019): EventMobi's platform won the award for Best Event App at the 2019 Event Technology Awards in London (tied with co-winner CrowdComms).

In addition to the above, EventMobi has frequently appeared in industry rankings by software review platforms. For example, it has been rated as a leading event management solution on Capterra and G2’s annual lists in multiple years. The company also won categories at the 2022 Eventex Awards for its hybrid and virtual event platform.
