= Video game publisher =

Company that publishes video games

A video game publisher is a company that publishes video games that have been developed either internally by the publisher or externally by a video game developer.

== Functions ==
Video game publishers are responsible for the publishing and distribution of games by handling their marketing and dealing with digital distribution platforms (e.g. Steam) and console-based online stores, as well as providing stores with physical copies in some cases. They also often finance the development, either by paying a video game developer (external development), or by paying an internal staff of developers called a studio. Other functions usually performed by the publisher include handling intellectual property rights for the game and its assets; and paying for quality assurance and testing.

Large publishers also may attempt to boost efficiency across all internal and external development teams by providing technical support and overseeing the production of the game and its creative process. Because the publisher often finances development, they usually try to manage development risk along with a staff of producers or managers to monitor the developer's progress, critique ongoing development, and assist as necessary. Most video games created by an external video game developer are paid for with periodic advances on royalties. These advances are paid when the developer reaches certain stages of development, called milestones.

== Types ==
AAA game publishers produce and create games that are high budget and groundbreaking. They are advanced in technology and forward the boundaries of technology and creativity in the video game world. AAA game publishers often produce popular and blockbuster games. These publishers have the financial resource and means to fund large game development projects. These publishers implement and fund marketing and distribution to guarantee reach and exposure for their games. With their funds to market they are able to advertise and reach a wider consumer pool and have access to distribute to a big network. Although they have creative constraints within game development and marketing, they often focus and follow market trends. They have a higher demand to attain commercial success. Examples of AAA video game publishers are Electronic Arts, Ubisoft, and Activision.

Indie game publishers are companies that work with independent developers. Their focus is on developing games that promotes creativity and originality. Developers have creative control over their games. These publishers implement intimate collaborations between the publishers and the developers. Often stand out in the video game market due to the more unique genres. Indie game publishers have restrict marketing budgets and have small audience reach and visibility. Examples of Indie video game publishers are Devolver Digital, Annapurna Interactive and Raw Fury.

Mobile game publishers produce and specialize in video games on smartphones and tablet devices. They take advantage of the widespread appeal and rise of mobile gaming. These publishers enhance games for touch based interfaces and devices. They are proficient in designing monetization tactics for mobile platforms. Mobile game publishers have a comprehensive understanding of the mobile gaming market. They have proficiency in strategies for engagement and user acquisition for mobile sites. For mobile gaming, there is access through app stores for distribution channels. There are obstacles with monetization due to lack of in-app purchase and free-to-play(F2P) models. Examples of Mobile game publishers include Supercell, King, and Zynga.

When engaging a publisher of any of these types as a studio or developer, there will be a publishing agreement set in place. A publishing agreement defines the entire working relationship of the developer with the publisher.

== Investor interest ==
Numerous video game publishers are traded publicly on stock markets. As a group, they have had mixed performance. At present, Electronic Arts is the only third-party publisher present in the S&P 500 diversified list of large U.S. corporations; in April 2010, it entered the Fortune 500 for the first time.

Hype over video game publisher stocks has been breathless at two points:

- In the early 1990s, the introduction of CD-ROM computer drives caused hype about a multimedia revolution that would bring interactive entertainment to the masses. Several Hollywood movie studios formed "interactive" divisions to profit in this allegedly booming new media. Most of these divisions later folded after expensively producing several games that were heavy in "full-motion video" content, but light in the quality of gameplay.
- In the United States, revenue from the sales of video and computer games exceeded revenue from film box-office receipts for the first time in the dot-com days of the late 1990s, when technology companies in general were surrounded by hype. The video game publishers did not, however, experience the same level of rise in stock prices that many dot-com companies saw. This was probably because video game publishing was seen as a more mature industry whose prospects were fairly well understood, as opposed to the typical exciting dot-com business model with unknown but possibly sky-high prospects. While many technology stocks were eventually destroyed in the dot-com crash in the early 2000s, the stock prices of the video game publishers recovered as a group; several of the larger publishers such as EA and Take-Two Interactive achieved historical highs in the mid-2000s.
