= Hard copy (disambiguation) =

A hard copy is a permanent reproduction, or copy, in the form of a physical object.

It may also refer to:

- Hard Copy (TV program), an American tabloid television show that ran from 1989 to 1999
- Hard Copy (American TV series), a CBS primetime newspaper-centered insider drama that was part of the 1987 American television season
- Hard Copy (South African TV series), a South African television drama series that ran from 2005 to 2016
- The Hard Copy Observer, a defunct publication about the printing and imaging business
- Hard-copy terminal, an early type of computer terminal that printed text instead of displaying it on a screen
- Hardcopy (magazine), a defunct computer trade magazine
