= Qbank =

QBank is a web-based DAM-solution aimed mainly towards businesses and governments.

== History ==
QBank was founded 2003 in Stockholm, Sweden, and sells business and government cloud-based products and services within DAM (Digital asset management).

The company has over 160 clients with over 550,000 users worldwide, who primarily use the service to manage digital material such as pictures, movies, presentations, logos, etc. The typical client is a large and global company including Ericsson, Electrolux and Swedish Match. The company sells QBank through partners that manage customizations and implementation for clients

In 2014, the business had a turnover of just over 15,2 million SEK, with a profit of 4 million SEK pro forma with a historic growth rate of 30-40% per year. The growth is generated from existing as well as new customers. The revenue from the existing customer base increases by adding users, services, features and more storage.

The company has been publicly listed and traded on the Stockholm Stock Exchange since June, 2014.

QBank is a certified DAM-vendor by the DAM-foundation, and are listed as #11 on the 20 most popular DAM-software products by Capterra. Market research company Markets and Markets listed QBank as a DAM-vendor in their report covering the global forecast to 2019 of the DAM-market.
