= Learning platform =

Learning platform could refer to:

- Learning management system (LMS)
- Learning Experience Platform (LXP)
