= The Mathematical Diary =

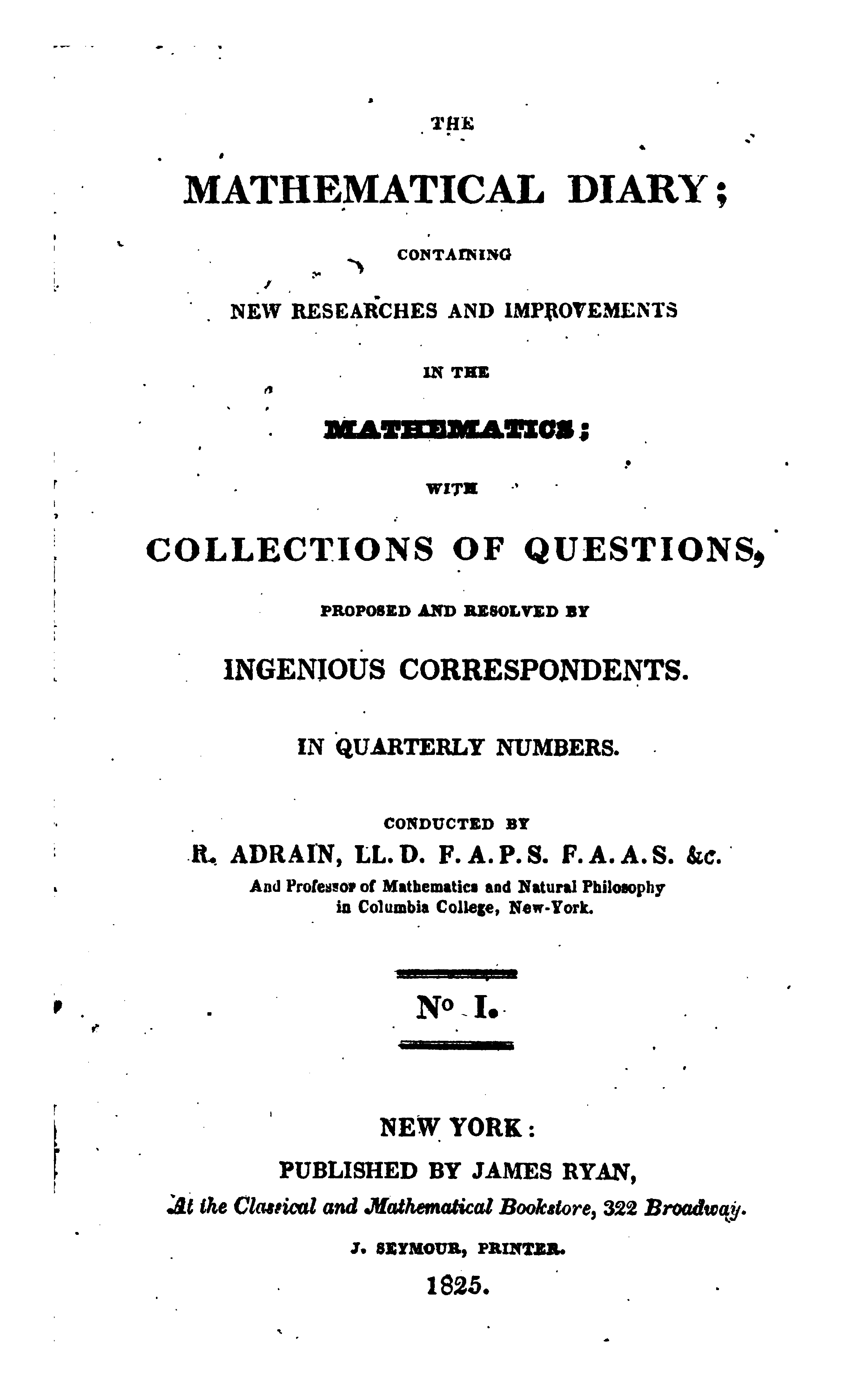
- Cover of the first issue
- Discipline: Mathematics
- Language: English

Publication details
- History: 1825–1833

Standard abbreviations
- ISO 4: Math. Diary

The Mathematical Diary was an early American mathematical journal and mathematics magazine, published between 1825 and 1833.

The Mathematical Diary was founded by Robert Adrain at Columbia College (now Columbia University) after two unsuccessful attempts, in 1808 and 1814, to start a more purely academic mathematics journal, The Analyst, or, Mathematical Museum. The Mathematical Diary contained, in addition to some serious mathematics, articles of general interest such as mathematical puzzles aimed at the amateur problem-solver, which may have helped it attract more laypeople as subscribers and contributed to its greater longevity. Adrain edited the first four issues; after he left Columbia in 1826 for Rutgers, James Ryan, previously the publisher, took over the editorship. A total of thirteen issues were published.
