= The Hard Copy Observer =

Defunct publication based in Newtonville, Massachusetts

- Frequency: Monthly
- Publisher: Charles LeCompte
- Founded: 1991
- First issue: October 1991; 34 years ago
- Final issue: August 2009; 16 years ago
- Company: Lyra Research
- Country: United States
- Based in: Newtonville, Massachusetts
- Website: hardcopyobserver.com

The Hard Copy Observer was a regular publication of Lyra Research based in Newtonville, Massachusetts. It was a business (as opposed to consumer) publication targeted at the printing and imaging business, and was widely considered the premier authoritative factual source for that industry. Tekrati, a firm in the analyst relations business, summarized The Hard Copy Observer as "a leading publication serving the industry and, in fact, the printer industry bible."

== History and profile ==
Volume 1, Number 1 of The Observer was published in October 1991. Its founder as well as original editor and publisher was Charles LeCompte, who remained as publisher until 2010.

The success of the publication spawned what grew to be a much larger marketing research organization, Lyra Research, headquartered in Newton, Massachusetts. A companion monthly newsletter, The Hard Copy Supplies Journal, was also developed to focus on the consumables portion of the business.

The first edition was 28 pages in length, and featured front-page stories about Xerox, Apple Computer, and Dataproducts. Its "look" was the no-nonsense black-and-white format that for the most part has remained unchanged. Today's subscription rate is $650 a year, compared to 1991's $495 a year, though the average edition's length, in its print form, grew to over 50 pages. Then as now, the publication is subscriber-supported with virtually no advertising.

The print version of the publication ended with the August 2009 issue, and beginning in September 2009, the newsletter content was available online.

In April 2012, the Photizo Group acquired Lyra Research, and the online Observer was phased out as it was merged with Photizo's industry news resources.
