= Magic Quadrant =

Market research reports

Magic Quadrant (MQ) is a series of market research reports published by research and advisory firm Gartner that rely on proprietary qualitative data analysis methods to demonstrate market trends, such as direction, maturity, and participants. Their analyses are conducted for several specific technology industries and are updated every 1–2 years: once an updated report has been published, its predecessor is "retired".

== Rating ==
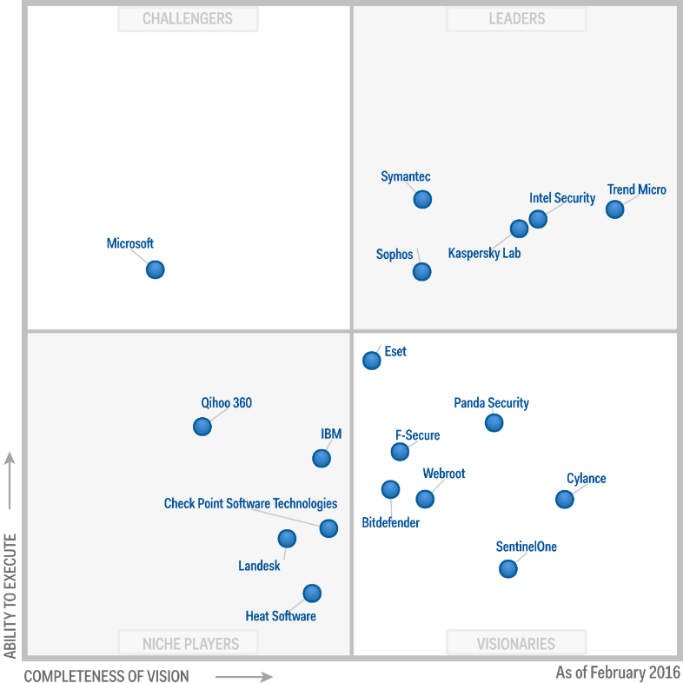
Example of Magic Quadrant classification.

Gartner rates vendors upon two criteria: completeness of vision and ability to execute.

- Completeness of vision – Reflects the vendor's innovation, and whether the vendor drives or follows the market.
- Ability to execute – Summarizes factors such as the vendor's financial viability, market responsiveness, product development, sales channels and customer base.

The two component scores lead to a vendor position in one of four quadrants:

=== Leaders ===
Vendors in the "Leaders" quadrant have the highest composite scores for their completeness of vision and ability to execute. A vendor in the Leaders quadrant has the market share, credibility, and marketing and sales capabilities needed to support new technologies. These vendors demonstrate a clear understanding of market needs, are innovators and thought leaders, and they have well-articulated plans that customers and prospects can use when designing their infrastructures and strategies. In addition, they have a presence in the five major geographic regions, consistent financial performance, and broad platform support.

=== Challengers ===
Vendors in the "Challengers" quadrant have high scores mainly for their ability to execute. They both participate in the market and execute well enough to be a serious threat to vendors in the "Leaders" quadrant. They have strong products, as well as sufficiently credible market position and resources to sustain continued growth. Financial viability is not an issue for vendors in the "Challengers" quadrant, but they lack the size and influence of vendors in the "Leaders" quadrant due to their relative lack of vision.

=== Visionaries ===
Vendors in the "Visionaries" quadrant have high scores mainly for their completeness of vision. They deliver innovative products that address operationally or financially important end-user problems at a broad scale, but have not yet demonstrated the ability to capture market share or maintain sustainable levels of profitability. Visionary vendors are frequently privately held companies and acquisition targets for larger, established companies. The likelihood of acquisition often reduces the risks associated with installing their systems.

=== Niche Players ===
Vendors in the "Niche Players" quadrant have relatively low scores for both their ability to execute and their completeness of vision. They are often narrowly focused on specific market or vertical segments. This quadrant often also includes vendors that are adapting their existing products to enter the market under consideration, or larger vendors having difficulty developing and executing on their vision.

== Gartner Critical Capabilities ==
Gartner Critical Capabilities complement Magic Quadrant analysis to offer deeper insight into the products and services offered by multiple vendors by a comparative analysis that scores competing products or services against a set of critical differentiators identified by Gartner.

Gartner has periodically ended Magic Quadrant listings for IT Service Management, Web Content Management, and other industries as those markets have fully matured or other factors rendered the analytic framework inapplicable.

== Criticism ==
The Magic Quadrant, and analysts in general, skew the market: according to research, by applying their methodologies to describe a market, they change that marketplace to fit their tools.

Another criticism is that open source vendors are not considered sufficiently by analysts like Gartner, as has been published in an online discussion between a VP from Talend and a German Research VP from Gartner.

In 2009, software vendor ZL Technologies filed a federal lawsuit against Gartner that challenged the "legitimacy" of Gartner's Magic Quadrant rating system. Gartner filed a motion to dismiss by claiming First Amendment protection since it contends that its MQ reports contain "pure opinion", which legally means opinions that are not based on fact. The court threw out the ZL case because it lacked a specific complaint. The decision was upheld on appeal.

== See also ==
- Hype cycle
- Product-Market Growth Matrix
