= Robert Adrain =

Irish mathematician (1775–1843)

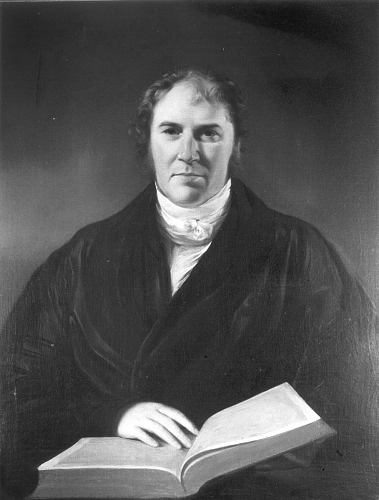
- portrait by Charles C. Ingham
- Born: 30 September 1775; Carrickfergus, County Antrim, Ireland
- Died: 10 August 1843 (aged 67); New Brunswick, New Jersey, US
- Known for: Least squares method
- Scientific career
- Fields: Diophantine algebra Statistics
- Workplaces: Queen's College/Rutgers; Columbia College; University of Pennsylvania

Robert Adrain (30 September 1775 – 10 August 1843) was an Irish political exile who won renown as a mathematician in the United States. He left Ireland after leading republican insurgents in the Rebellion of 1798, and settled in New Jersey and Pennsylvania. With Nathaniel Bowditch, he shares the distinction of being the first scholar to publish original mathematical research in America. This included his formulation of the method of least squares while working on a surveying problem (in two proofs of the exponential law of error published independently of Carl Friedrich Gauss) for which he is chiefly remembered. His fields of applied mathematical interest included physics, astronomy and geodesy. Many of his mathematical investigations focused on the shape of the Earth.

== Biography ==
Adrain was born in Carrickfergus, County Antrim, Ireland. His father, of French Huguenot descent, was a school teacher and maker of mathematical instruments, and he apparently received a good education until he was fifteen when both his parents died. He then supported himself and his four siblings by assuming his father's position as a teacher and as a private tutor. In the cause of democratic reform and national independence, on 7 June 1798 he led a contingent of United Irishmen in the rebel army commanded by Henry Joy McCracken at the Battle of Antrim. In the confrontation with British Crown forces, he was near fatally wounded by one of his own men. After being nursed back to health, with a bounty on his head he, his wife and infant child escaped to America.

Although he was himself largely self-taught in mathematics, he secured a teaching position at the academy at Princeton, New Jersey. In 1801 he became president of the York County Academy in York, Pennsylvania. He wrote for the Mathematical Correspondent (edited by George Baron), the first mathematical journal in the United States, contributing the first article published in America on diophantine algebra. Later he twice attempted, in 1808 and 1814, to found his own journal, The Analyst, or, Mathematical Museum. While he failed to attract sufficient subscribers, the first volume of the Analyst has been considered "the best collection of mathematical work produced in the United States up to that time". As well as from Adrain, it included contributions from Nathaniel Bowditch, Robert Patterson, John Gummere and Ferdinand Rudolph Hassler. Recognition followed.

In 1809 Adrain was called to a professorship at Rutgers (then Queen's) College which, in 1810, awarded him an honorary M.A.. In 1812 he was elected a Fellow of the American Philosophical Society and the next year, when he took a position at Columbia, of the American Academy of Arts and Sciences. From 1827 he was Professor of Mathematics in the University of Pennsylvania

In 1825, he founded a somewhat more successful publication targeting a wider readership, The Mathematical Diary, which was published through 1832. It was fashioned after the Correspondent, but at a higher level of mathematical involvement in problems solving and exposition.

In 1834, Adrain was asked to resign from the University of Pennsylvania on grounds of class ill-discipline (instances of students overturning benches and throwing eggs). He returned to New Brunswick. He rented a school room and offered private tutoring until 1836. Local records in New Brunswick indicate that during the 1830s, he held in slavery a woman named Caroline and her son Alfred. After 1836, he returned to New York and taught at the Columbia College Grammar School before retiring to New Brunswick in 1840 where three years later he died.

It is suggested that Adrain, today, consistent with his conviction that "the last and highest department of mathematical science consists in its application to the laws and phenomenon of the natural world", would be considered an applied mathematician. Among his broad interests in physics, astronomy and geography, his paramount concern was dynamic geodesy, specifically the mathematical investigation of the shape of the earth.

Adrain was the father of Congressman Garnett B. Adrain. He is commemorated by a blue plaque, unveiled at Carrickfergus by the Ulster History Circle.
