= SoundView Technology Group =

American technology-focused firm

Soundview Technology Group
- Type: Active
- Industry: Research, Technology, Investments
- Founded: 1977
- Founder: Gideon Gartner
- Fate: Acquired by Charles Schwab in 2003, Reinstated as an independent organization in November 2011
- Headquarters: Boston, Massachusetts, United States
- Website: http://soundview.co

Soundview Technology Group is an American technology-focused firm known primarily for its equity research on technology and other growth-oriented companies. The securities and investment banking company was integrated into Charles Schwab in 2003. The business was relaunched in 2005 by former research director Ken Tuttle, who finally obtained SoundView's trademarks in 2011.

Prior to 2003, Soundview was unique in that it combined accepted Wall Street research and distribution methods, with the intimate (albeit "arms length") relationship with Gartner analysts, and arguably became the leading technology research boutique on Wall Street.

SoundView was based in Old Greenwich, Connecticut, and is now in Boston, Massachusetts.

== History ==
In 1977, Gideon Gartner initiated a financial service for Gartner Group via a partnership with Dillon, Read & Co., which distributed its reports and personal services to Dillon, Read & Co. investment client organizations. Gartner Group severed the Dillon Read relationship and became an independent financial company, Gartner Securities Corp., in 1984.

Gartner Securities was spun off to its shareholders just before its first public offering in 1986, providing analysis, investment advice, and investment banking services, to institutional investors. The firm changed its name in 1988 to Soundview Technology, when Gartner was acquired by Saatchi & Saatchi.

From 1988 to 1991 the firm remained a small focused brokerage operation with the bulk of their clients being small institutions and hedge funds. In 1991 the firm hired a senior investment banking executive, Brian Bristol, to begin to build an investment banking practice.

== Acquisitions ==
Wit SoundView acquired the E*Offering business unit of E*Trade in May 2000 to further expand into technology investment banking. This acquisition not only added a substantial number of new staff but also more offices in San Francisco and London.

=== Merger with Wit Capital ===
At the peak of the dot-com bubble in early 2000, SoundView merged with Wit Capital to form Wit SoundView in a $320 million all-stock transaction. Wit Capital had been founded just a few years earlier, in 1996, by Andrew Klein. Wit positioned itself as an online investment banking firm focused on the Internet and technology sectors. Wit had been backed by Goldman Sachs, which sold its stake in 2001.

=== Sale to Charles Schwab ===
On November 19, 2003, Charles Schwab announced the acquisition of SoundView for $15.50 per share, or approximately $345 million. The acquisition was intended to integrate SoundView's equity research content with Charles Schwab's trading execution capabilities. SoundView received a 57% premium to its market price before the announcement.

=== 2011 sale of trademarks ===
In 2011, the SoundView trademarks were acquired by one of the SoundView partners to begin building a new SoundView Technology Group.
