= Industry analyst =

Performs primary and secondary market research within an industry

An industry analyst performs primary and secondary market research within an industry such as information technology, consulting or insurance. Analysts assess sector trends, create segment taxonomies, size markets, prepare forecasts, and develop industry models. Industry analysts usually work for research and advisory services firms, and some analysts also perform advisory (consulting) services. Typically, analysts specialize in a single segment or sub-segment, researching the broad development of the market rather than focusing on specific publicly traded companies, equities, investments, or associated financial opportunities as a financial analyst might.

== Coverage ==
The Institute of Influencer & Analyst Relations (IIAR) provides this official definition:

An information and communications technology (ICT) industry analyst is a person, working individually or within a firm, whose business model incorporates creating and publishing research about, and advising on how, why and where ICT-related products and services can be procured, deployed and used.

That is not to say that industry analysts do not focus on specific market participants and their product and service portfolios, or that financial analysts ignore industries. Gideon Gartner, one of the industry analyst business pioneers, was a former financial analyst before launching the Gartner Group in 1979. But industry analysts do research in the context of a specific sector or market segment, along with the competitive offerings of the other public and non-public companies that comprise the market.

In many industries there is significant overlap between the work product of industry analysts and financial analysts. The information technology and consulting industries, however, are examples of industries where a significant proportion of important market participants are not publicly traded entities with readily available information and highly regulated disclosure requirements.

Most analyst firms focus on one or more market segments, such as cloud computing, Wireless communications, audit services, or pharmaceutical industry safety monitoring. Analyst firms and the analysts that work for them are continuously expanding and shifting their coverage areas to keep pace with trends like technological convergence or media convergence, for example. This is because demand for industry analyst research services is closely associated with the frequency of change in an industry. So the largest analyst firms tend to have extremely dynamic offerings, and the concentration of service offerings of all market players tends to focus on industry areas that are currently undergoing change.

== History ==
There are three industry analyst firms that have been in continuous operation since 1970 or earlier. Computer Review is the oldest analyst firm that has been in continuous operation since its inception in 1959, as Adams Associates. International Data Corp has been providing industry analyst and publishing services since 1964, and continues to be operated as a private company by its founder, Patrick Joseph McGovern. The last of the three, the Yankee Group, was founded by Howard Anderson in 1970. Anderson ran the firm until 1999.

Many industry analyst firms and analysts trace their roots to one of these three firms, particularly IDC, Gartner and the Yankee Group. George Colony, for example, was an analyst at the Yankee Group before founding Forrester Research. Dale Kutnick was also a Yankee Group analyst and equity holder before joining Gartner and later founding the Meta Group, which was subsequently purchased by Gartner. Yankee Group was ultimately acquired by 451 Research in 2013. Jim Lundy and Mike Anderson were analysts at Gartner before they founded Aragon Research.

== Industry analyst business ==
A community of more than 740 analyst firms spans the world. Research and advisory staffs at these companies range from one person to more than 1,000.

The "traditional" business model, based on continuous information services (CIS, aka subscriptions) where analysts author reports that are then sold to many clients is under pressure. Several firms are designing new analyst business models based on contemporary technologies, open-source licensing concepts, emerging markets, loosely federated analysts, and/or a more radical and visible emphasis on offshoring.

== Evolution of Analyst Relations ==
While firms such as Gartner, IDC, and Forrester have long been prominent in analyst relations, the field has expanded to include independent and boutique analyst firms. Examples include Moor Insights & Strategy, The Futurum Group, Constellation Research, and HyperFRAME Research. These firms often focus on specific technology sectors and offer alternative engagement models for vendors.

== Roles and deliverables ==
Industry analysts provide a combination of syndicated, no-syndicated and client-sponsored (bespoke) market research, competitive intelligence, and management consulting services.

Deliverables take many forms that can be grouped as follows:

- publications like research reports, white papers, research notes, and newsletters
- advisory services that include inquiries, briefings, consulting projects, study findings presentations or bespoke speaking engagements (for instance at internal client meetings or industry events)
- events such as conferences, seminars, and roundtables
- market analysis, such as quantitative market trends, forecasts and market shares.
- Amplification and market commentary through new media formats such as podcasts and webinars

Analyst firms serve a management decision support function at corporations and public service organisations and for the vendors, regulators and investors serving those industries.

Industry analysts serving buyers of technology-based products and services, where the largest concentration of industry analysts provide services, work with three primary groups of clients:

- Commercial and public service entities that use technology-based products and services.
- Vendors providing products and services to commercial and public service organizations, and the channel intermediaries that resell or aggregate these products and services, including hardware manufacturers, communications companies, software firms, IT services providers, value-added resellers, mobile network operators, and content aggregators.
- Organizations that invest-in, regulate, or support the vendors and intermediaries, including investment banks, anti-trust regulators, chambers of commerce, and leasing companies.

The subjects of research conducted by analysts include many of the same stakeholders that also buy services from analysts. This has caused the integrity of the research to be questioned, which is covered in more detail below. These research subjects include product and service buyers, users, and implementers; the product and service providers themselves, including their key supply chain partners; and sources of investment capital for the vendors, capital for client purchases of vendor products and services, and regulators. Analysts also perform at least passive sales support for their firms, such as contributing to sales meetings, contracts, project profitability, or lead generation programs. This is necessary because the clients are paying for their expertise and must have an opportunity to assess associated capabilities.

At most firms, analysts set research agendas in close cooperation with clients, design surveys, analyse findings, and write research. They may also conduct the surveys themselves, or they may work with third parties or interns to perform the data collection. Increasingly, analyst firms and their subcontractors employ online survey tools and offshoring to reduce research costs and turnaround time. In some cases, analyst firms are mining new sources of information from research partners, like consumer cell phone bills, RFID-enabled point of sale data, and analytics on Web traffic.

Typically, technology and service providers work to influence the analyst research agenda and coverage of their firm, and to build trusted relationships with individual analysts. This is done through a specialized marketing function called industry analyst relations or analyst relations, where some analyst relations staff members specialize themselves in certain product, service, industry, or geographic areas of the vendor organization. This function not only facilitates effective two-way communications between the analyst firm and the vendor, it attempts to concentrate and control spending on industry analyst research and advisory services.

It has become a common practice for analyst firms to assign a central "vendor relations" contact within their organization, to coordinate briefing, reprint and similar requests from vendors. Commercial and public sector client organizations have now assigned sourcing and procurement category managers as the primary contact for research and advisory services firms as well, to concentrate and better leverage spending on related products and services.

== Skills ==
Companies participating in the industry analyst profession have not adopted universal standards for employee education, skills, or professional conduct. Some firms adhere to standards set by competitive intelligence, market research or other professional associations such as MRPCA and the Insights Association. Overall, this situation results in competitive differentiation among analyst firms.

Most analyst firms require above-average written and oral communication skills.

== Integrity and transparency issues ==
Analyst objectivity and accuracy is an issue that is frequently debated. Much of the criticism appears to focus on the business relationships between analysts and the technology providers that are the subjects of their research. In short, analyst firms often rely heavily on revenues from the technology providers they cover (e.g., Darwin magazine, March 2001).

This source of revenue is a significant component of the business models of most analyst firms. Individual analysts and teams conduct research on industry segments where a vendor may provide products or services, and that same individual or group may provide research deliverables or advisory services to a vendor serving that segment. The analyst is then expected to provide independent objective advice to buyers of those products and services. This matrix of relationships presents opportunities where conflicts can arise. This is exacerbated by the training many vendor analyst relations professionals receive, where they are advised to focus spending on analysts that have the most ability to influence purchases of goods and services by clients, and to bypass controls analyst firms may have in place to preserve that objectivity by limiting direct access to certain analysts for non-research purposes.

There is also the issue of analyst firms signing boilerplate confidentiality agreements with vendor firms. This occurs when licensing research or performing advisory work, or when conducting detailed briefings in advance of announcements. The language in those agreements often limits the disclosure of certain information that may be disclosed to analysts in the normal course of their research, limiting their ability to fully disclose research findings to buyers of any research deliverable. Some research organizations now refuse to sign confidentiality agreements with vendors or service providers. But there may be a legacy of agreements in place that perpetually limit disclosure for some large vendor clients, so some of the smaller firms have limited work with vendors.

Burton Research, for example, enforces a cap of 20% of revenues to be derived from product vendors or service providers. Burton is now owned by Gartner, and continues to limit its vendor expenditures. Real Story Group is a small boutique firm that performs research on products and publishes evaluations. It works solely for buyers and refuses to accept business from vendors that are subjects of its evaluations. Despite a few exceptions, buy side industry analysts represent a small minority of analyst firms today. Even research firms whose services are tailored specifically to the interests of product and service buyers often derive some proportion of their revenues from vendors and service providers, since that information is important to them as well.

Another side to this debate is that analyst firms create hype and influence markets in several ways or at even influence deals directly when speaking to end-user buyers.

The debate over objectivity and independence has always been an active one, with some firms using independence (in absolute and relative terms) as a source of strategic differentiation. Other factors that affect research integrity include transparency with regard to research methodology and survey sampling, theoretical or shallow vs. in-depth or hands-on expertise of analysts, emphasis on qualitative over quantitative research, and the overall efficacy of a firm's research offerings toward the goal of improving the quality of business and technology decisions.

== See also ==
- Analyst
- Market research
- Analyst relations
