= Gideon Gartner =

American businessman (1935–2020)

Gideon Isaiah Gartner
- גדעון גרטנר
- Born: March 13, 1935; Mandatory Palestine
- Died: December 12, 2020 (aged 85); New York City, U.S.
- Citizenship: American
- Education: Massachusetts Institute of Technology (SB); MIT Sloan School of Management (MBA)
- Occupations: Businessman, computer systems engineer, investor, philanthropist, operations researcher, systems scientist
- Known for: Founding Gartner, SoundView Technology Group, Giga Information Group
- Spouse: Janet Sussman (m. 1961; div. 1978); Sarah Schweitzer (m. 2002)
- Children: 3 (Perry, Sabrina, Aleba); 1 step-son (Aaron Sylvan)

Gideon Isaiah Gartner (Hebrew: גדעון גרטנר; March 13, 1935 – December 12, 2020) was an American businessman, investor, and philanthropist. He was often referred to as the father of the modern analyst industry. He is best known as the founder of Gartner, Inc. (formerly Gartner Group Inc.) a Stamford, Connecticut, information technology (IT) research and advisory company.

== Early life and education ==
Gideon Isaiah Gartner was born on March 13, 1935, in Tel Aviv, to Eastern European Jewish émigrés. His father Abraham was an engineer, while his mother Pnina (née Bedri) was a musician and teacher. In 1938 the family moved to the United States and settled in Brooklyn, where Abraham became a civil engineer for New York City. Gartner attended the Yeshiva of Flatbush and then Midwood High School, graduating in 1952. A gifted musician who excelled at both piano and the French horn, he was offered a musical scholarship to the University of Miami, but was discouraged from pursuing music as a career choice. Instead, Gartner chose to attend the Massachusetts Institute of Technology, graduating in 1956 with a Bachelor of Science in Mechanical Engineering. He went on to earn his Masters in Business Administration from the MIT Sloan School of Management in 1960. Speaking about his courses at MIT, he is noted to have said that most classes bored him except computer science and programming courses.

== Career ==
=== Early career ===
Gartner began his career in operations research at System Development Corporation, a subcontractor to Philco Corporation. He worked in Paramus, New Jersey, for the U.S. military's Strategic Air Command control system and then in Alexandria, Virginia, for the Defense Communications Agency.

In 1961 Philco sold the first large-scale transistorized computer to Israel’s Ministry of Defense. The company assigned Gartner, with his background in Hebrew, to help Israeli programmers and to market Philco to other Israel government agencies.

While in Israel, Gartner was recruited by International Business Machines (IBM), becoming leader of the Systems Engineering staff serving emerging European and Mideast markets. Gartner rose steadily at IBM, eventually moving to its White Plains, New York, offices to become Manager of Market Information in the Data Processing Division, and a leading figure in the company’s department of commercial analysis.

In 1969, Gartner left IBM to form his first independent venture, Computer Decisions, a magazine publishing company that documented the latest happenings in the computer industry. The new publishing firm struggled in the recession of 1969-70 and was sold to a time-share company which subsequently failed.

=== Wall Street ===
In 1970, despite having no background in security analysis, Gartner was hired by EF Hutton to cover IBM and the burgeoning computer industry. He thrived at Hutton, and in 1972 joined Oppenheimer and Co. where he forged a national reputation as the top technology watcher on Wall Street.

Gartner introduced a series of innovations to the practice of security analysis, some of which foreshadowed the research techniques and marketing theories that would distinguish his later firms. These included chart-and-audiotape programs to deliver his analysis to clients in a more rapid and digestible manner than was customary; “chunking” lengthy research into shorter pieces with bottom-line emphasis, bridging the gap between the massive generalizations at most brokerage houses and the heavy technological data put out by market research firms; and distributing to clients a relentless flow of ancillary content in the form of daily short-takes and advice that became known as “sunflowers.”

Gartner also developed a reputation for going against the grain and accurately predicting computer trends and stock movements, with Stock Market Innovators, an industry trade paper, noting that “a remarkable number of his long-term forecasts have proven prophetic.” Some of these forecasts extended to developments that would come to pass after his time as an active analyst had ended, as when Gartner described in highly specific terms the capabilities, features, and challenges of what would become mass-produced personal computers.

Gartner was voted the top individual technology analyst on Wall Street every year from 1972 through 1977 in Institutional Investor Magazine’s annual poll of major banks, funds and other institutional investing firms. In the 1977 joint exhibit sponsored by the Association for Computing Machinery (ACM), Goldman Sachs, and the Boston Computer Museum, documented in the book “Wizards and Their Wonders: Portraits in Computing”, Gartner was honored as one of the preeminent “Communicator” stars in the IT industry. He rose to VP and head of the Oppenheimer Technology Group, and eventually became a partner.

=== Gartner, Inc. ===
While working at Oppenheimer and Co. in the late 1970s, Gartner realized that his investor insights would be valuable to computer manufacturers and end users too. He joined David L. Stein, an industry veteran, to form Gartner Group in 1979. Amongst other things the company analyzed residual value of used computers. Analysts for the group were noted to have gone through a stringent selection process with an inquisition themed group interview. He is known to have emphasized that analysts write concise reports filled with provocative views rather than dissertations. In his words, "If what you’re writing about isn’t controversial, don't write about it." He would serve as the group's CEO and chairman through April 1991.

At the time, other advisory firms usually sold to only computer hardware, software, and services vendors. Exceptions at that time included Dataquest (selling a service for investors), and Input Corp. (selling a service for users). Gartner sold to vendors, plus users (generally large enterprises and other organizations, such as government agencies), plus investors and consulting firms.

Investors were among the first targets, as Gartner had just resigned as partner of Oppenheimer & Co., but at Oppenheimer he had also begun servicing a group of Chief Information Officers (CIOs) of large corporations, which became the base for Gartner's enterprise activities. As Gartner Group's coverage of IBM was deep (IBM was the primary industry vendor at the time), other vendors desired to be tied into Gartner’s research network. Thus, the market Gartner addressed was unusually broad, and each constituency provided insights and information which benefited others, arguably creating market advantage. Very soon the group became the preferred place a corporate client went when it had any question about the IT industry.

Gartner's venture capital financing was unique among advisory firms at the time. Gartner Group was initially financed by Bessemer Venture Partners and E.M. Warburg Pincus, with Bank Paribas joining a year later. This led to the firm being the first in its field to raise public capital in a 1986 offering, supporting its growth. Raising capital from venture firms allowed Gartner to build a nationwide sales organization, the first of its kind in the industry.

Gartner instituted a sales measurement and compensation scheme, based upon how IBM had measured its rental sales, but novel when applied to consulting/advisory firms: since Gartner Group sold annual renewable contracts and recorded "Contract Value", it based progress reporting and compensation (commission for sales personnel and bonus for analysts and managers), on the growth of appropriate Contract Value (CV) during a period of time; this was called Net Contract Value Increase (NCVI). Uniquely, compared with all prior consulting and advisory models, all variable compensation was based upon growth and not on revenue from renewals, an important factor in developing a strong growth culture.

Having come from Wall Street, Gartner adopted the idea of employing senior industry people, who were in fact "peers" of their prospective clients. This was a departure from the current industry practice at the time, where analysts were relatively young and relatively inexperienced albeit bright. Instead of focusing primarily on market research, Gartner emphasized a basket of "values" including : G2 (competitive intelligence and analysis), quantitative methods for clients to analyze residual values and obsolescence metrics of IT hardware, saving money within the IT organization, and IT education within clients’ staffs.

Gartner developed a disciplined "research process", which was documented in a Research Notebook, used in regular training programs at the firm. Process highlights called for analysts to "scan" all sources of input, be trained in recognizing "patterns", develop "new ideas" from these patterns, and "document" the results in brief one-page "research notes". General industry practice at the time was to publish relatively long reports. Gartner research "gimmicks" were introduced, such as the "stalking horse", a research collaborative tool whereby analysts were compelled to graphically present and defend their logic at research meetings. Thus, the "horse" became the company mascot. Intensive research meetings for all researchers were conducted at least weekly, and provided additional training and other benefits. Other innovations were introduced, in areas such as research-hiring interview methods, conferences including the breakthrough Symposium, inquiry systems to connect clients with internal analysts. All the above contributed to an unusually strong and acknowledged organizational culture.

Gartner Group was ranked among the fastest growing private firms in the U.S. (by Inc. Magazine) until it went public in 1986, whereupon it was listed for several years among the best small companies in America (by Business Week, e.g. #9 overall, and #1 in profitability, in 1987). Gartner was sold to Saatchi & Saatchi in 1988, and Gartner signed a contract to remain as CEO until April 1991. In 1990, Gartner led a successful leveraged buyout of the firm financed by Information Partners, a private equity fund owned by Bain Capital and Dun & Bradstreet.

=== Soundview Technologies ===
Gartner, who had retained contact with his Wall Street clients, initiated a new financial service for Gartner Group via a new partnership with Dillon, Read & Co., which distributed its reports and personal services to Dillon, Read & Co. investment client organizations. Gartner Group severed the Dillon Read relationship and became an independent broker-dealer in 1984, named Gartner Securities Corp., and spun this business out to its shareholders just before its first public offering in 1986, providing its analysis, investment advice and banking services, to all institutional investors. Its name was changed in 1988 to SoundView Technology Group, when Gartner was acquired by Saatchi & Saatchi. Soundview was unique in that it combined accepted Wall Street research and distribution methods, with the intimate (albeit "arms length") relationship with Gartner analysts, and arguably became the leading technology research boutique on Wall Street. But it merged in 2000 with Wit Capital, and was eventually sold (early 2004) to Charles Schwab & Co., and thereafter completely absorbed into Schwab and UBS.

=== GiGa Information Group ===
Giga Information Group was founded by Gartner in 1995. He raised more than $15 million in several tranches to develop the company; he was Chairman and CEO until late 1999. In less than four years from first shipment (April 1, 1996, to December 1999), this innovative firm became the fastest growing technology advisory consulting company in history, generating a run rate from zero to over $65 million, with more than 1,200 enterprise clients.

Three primary innovations were introduced to the advisory business through Giga: its offering of a single comprehensive IT Advisory service (compared with the typical multiple services of other advisory firms), an external cadre of experts to supplement the strategic nature of analysts on staff, and a set of web functions which stressed objectivity of analysis, and allowed on-line research by clients (called “The Knowledge Salon”).

Giga went public in 1998, but its stock languished during and after the technology stock market meltdown of 2000. In February 2003 the company was sold to Forrester Research.

== Other activities and interests ==
Gartner lived in Aspen, Colorado, and Stamford, Connecticut, and was involved in business ventures, athletics, and classical music. His music background includes a lifetime of piano practice, as well as performing on the French Horn, having been a member of the London School Symphony Orchestra, and the Brooklyn Philharmonic (then called the Brooklyn Philharmonia). He was on the board of the Opera Orchestra of N.Y, was a trustee of the Music Associates of Aspen (the Aspen Music Festival and School), was a fellow of the Aspen Institute, and was on the National Councils or equivalent, of the Aspen Art Museum, and the Anderson Ranch.

He served on the Library Committee of the M.I.T. Corporation and was a Sustaining Fellow Life Member of M.I.T. He was a past member of the board of the Society for Information Management where he was Special Appointee to the President. He was a Director's Circle member of the Charles Babbage Institute and a member of the board of directors of the IT History Society. In the 1977 joint exhibit sponsored by the ACM and Goldman Sachs in Washington, D.C., and the Boston Computer Museum, documented in the book “Wizards and Their Wonders: Portraits in Computing”, Gartner was honored as one of the 19 “Communicator” stars in the IT industry.

Gartner's professional activities have included speaking before major organizations worldwide. He has addressed graduate student groups at Harvard Business School, M.I.T., Yale, University of Georgia, and Arizona State, among others. In 1985, Gartner taught a course at UCLA’s Graduate School of Management (GSM), which was formally rated by his students as their best course taken throughout GSM. Gartner has also written extensively, for example, the AMA journal, series of articles for Computer Decisions and Information Week magazines, and the forward and much of Chapter 7, in “The E-Marketplace…Strategies for success in B2B eCommerce”, by Warren Raisch (McGraw Hill, 2001).

He was an active angel investor in early-stage companies, and was a member of New York Angels.

== Personal life ==
Gartner's marriage to his first wife, Janet Sussman Gartner, was part of the inspiration for Erich Segal's novel and film Love Story. Gartner and Segal had both been smitten with Sussman through and beyond their college years, and Segal's heartbreak led to Sussman becoming an inspiration for the character Jenny.

Gartner died on December 12, 2020, at his home in New York, of complications from Alzheimer's disease. He was aged 85.

== Sources ==
- Gartner Inc. annual reports
- Gideon I. Gartner, Oral history interview by Jeffrey R. Yost, 12 August 2005, Aspen, Colorado. Charles Babbage Institute, University of Minnesota, Minneapolis
- Securities Exchange Commission documents
- Gartner Group Records, 1981-2000. Charles Babbage Institute, University of Minnesota. Collection of 57 linear feet documents Gideon Gartner's business activity with his companies Gartner Group, Giga, and Soundview Technology Group.
