= Nubera =

Spanish software review company

- Company type: For-profit
- Founded: 2010; 16 years ago
- Founders: Christophe Primault (CEO) and Manuel Jaffrin (COO)
- Headquarters: Barcelona, Spain
- Parent: Gartner
- Website: Official website

Nubera is a Barcelona, Spain-based software review company that was founded in 2010 by Christophe Primault and Manuel Jaffrin. The company was acquired by Gartner in 2015, and is now operated as a subsidiary of Gartner's.

== History ==
Nubera was founded in 2010 in Barcelona, Spain by Christophe Primault (a marketing professional) and Manuel Jaffrin (a computer engineer). Nubera published an app review website called GetApp, focussing on apps for business usage. The company was initially funded by Christophe and Manual, and then received a $1.1M investment in 2011 from Nauta Capital, a Spanish-American investment firm.

In October 2012, Nubera acquired Tarpipe, a company that specialized in integrating cloud apps. In 2013, Nubera launched a business listing for mobile section for iOS and Android devices. According to TechCrunch, "by 2013, the app listed 5,000+ apps from 20,000 vendors including Basecamp, Salesforce, Dropbox and Zoho, among many others". The company launched a number of other apps and searching tools such as GetApp Lab, AppStorm, AppAppeal and Cloudwork (a cloud apps integration platform) that were integrated in its online marketplace.

On July 1, 2015, Nubera (GetApp) was acquired by the IT advisory company Gartner. The sale price is undisclosed and Nubera became a subsidiary of Gartner as a result.
