= Analyst =

An analyst is an individual who performs analysis of a topic. The term may refer to:

== In business and finance ==
- Actuarial analyst, deals with the measurement and management of risk and uncertainty
- Business analyst, examines the needs and concerns of clients and stakeholders
- Data analyst, retrieves, organizes and analyzes information from various sources to help an organization achieve business goals
- Financial analyst, analyzes securities and business equity in economics and finance
- Industry analyst, performs market research on segments of industries to identify trends in business, finance and technology
- Marketing analyst, analyzes price, customer, competitor and economic data to help companies
- Quantitative analyst, applies mathematical techniques to investment banking, especially in the fields of risk management, trading, and financial derivatives

== In physical sciences ==
- Analyst (journal), a chemistry journal
- Analyst (software), mass spectrometry software
- Public analyst, a qualified chemist appointed by a local authority in the UK

== In social sciences ==
- Behavior Analyst, practices applied behavior science
- Intelligence analyst, in government intelligence
- Psychoanalyst, acts to facilitate understanding of a patient's unconscious mind

== In other fields ==
- Color analyst, assists the main sports commentator
- Handwriting analyst, performs a personality assessment through handwriting
- News analyst, examines and interprets broadcast news
- Numerical analyst, develops and analyzes numerical algorithms
- Public policy analyst, analyzes the effect of public policies with respect to their goals
- Systems analyst, analyzes technical design and functional design for software development

== See also ==
- The Analyst (disambiguation)
- The Analyst, a 1734 famous criticism by Bishop Berkeley
- Annalists, historians in ancient Rome
