= The Analyst, or, Mathematical Museum =

The Analyst
- Discipline: Mathematics
- Language: English
- Edited by: Robert Adrain

Publication details
- History: 1808, 1814
- Publisher: William P. Farrand

Standard abbreviations
- ISO 4: Analyst

Indexing
- ISSN: 2156-1990
- OCLC no.: 2257502

The Analyst, or, Mathematical Museum was an early American mathematics journal. Founded by Robert Adrain in 1808, it published one volume of four issues that year before discontinuing publication. Despite its extremely short life, it published papers by several notable mathematicians in the nascent American mathematical community, including Nathaniel Bowditch and Ferdinand Hassler; most importantly, Adrain himself published an independent formulation of the method of least squares.

After securing a professorship at Columbia University, Adrain attempted to revive the journal in 1814, but it published only one issue before again ceasing publication. He would later go on to found a more popularly oriented journal, The Mathematical Diary.
