= Analyst relations =

Analyst relations (AR) is a corporate communications and marketing discipline in which organizations engage with industry analyst firms and, increasingly, independent business-to-business (B2B) influencers. AR programs aim to inform analyst research, shape how vendors are represented in comparative evaluations, and gather insights that influence technology buyers and investors.

The AR function originated in the information and communications technology (ICT) sector in the 1980s, when firms such as Gartner, IDC, and Forrester became influential in enterprise procurement. More recent surveys describe AR as both a communications role and a strategic function: providing competitive intelligence, monitoring analyst perceptions of competitors, and channeling market feedback into product and go-to-market strategy. As a result, AR serves both external communication and internal advisory purposes, linking messaging, product development, and executive decision-making with independent market analysis.

== Industry overview ==
Industry analysts are independent experts who research, evaluate, and publish insights about technology markets, products, and services. They are often employed by research and advisory firms such as Gartner, Forrester, IDC, Omdia, or Everest Group, though some work as independents or within boutique firms. Analysts produce market forecasts, vendor comparisons, and decision-support research that Fortune 1,000 technology buyers widely use to determine the best options for major investment in technology and services - especially where the deal is complex, changing, costly, or critical. Top industry analysts have the power to inform, make, or break deals, thanks to their deep-rooted, subscription-based relationships with end-user technology buyers. Some analysts also focus on helping technology vendors with their strategies for success with technology buyers. Because analyst reports can influence multi-million-dollar procurement decisions, vendors maintain analyst relations (AR) programs to provide accurate information, respond to evaluations, understand how their offerings are perceived in the market, and learn about emerging trends from analysts.

Independent analysts and influencer-analysts are often quoted in B2B media and are active on blogs, podcasts, and social platforms. They have become important voices alongside large firms such as Gartner, Forrester, and IDC.

The number of professionals working in Analyst Relations (AR) worldwide is not precisely known. However, indicators suggest the field encompasses tens of thousands of practitioners. In 2025, LinkedIn listed more than 2,000 open positions in the United States alone with “Analyst Relations” in the title, while a 2024 survey by the Institute of Industry Analyst Relations (IIAR>) reported that AR team sizes typically range from small groups of fewer than five staff to departments of more than a dozen specialists in large enterprises. Taken together, these data points suggest that the profession has a significant but specialized global footprint across the technology and services industries.

=== Remit and activities ===
Analyst Relations (AR) professionals manage how organizations engage with industry analysts through a mix of communications, intelligence gathering, and participation in research processes. A 2023 Info-Tech Research Group report described core AR activities as scheduling analyst briefings and inquiry calls, providing information for research notes, and coordinating submissions for comparative evaluations such as Gartner Magic Quadrants or Forrester Waves.

Practitioner surveys highlight that AR teams are also expected to capture analyst feedback on competitors and market trends, and distribute those insights internally to executives, product managers, and marketing teams. This intelligence function positions AR as both an external communications role and an internal advisory channel.

Analysts themselves have commented on effective and ineffective practices. Former Gartner analyst Anton Chuvakin noted that poorly prepared briefings and outdated presentation decks undermine credibility with analysts. Analysts at Deep Analysis emphasized that presentations without customer examples or implementation detail often fail to demonstrate vendor competence.

Surveys of AR practitioners suggest that relationship management is considered a central element of the role. Spotlight’s 2024 survey reported that AR professionals ranked “relationship quality” as their top priority, ahead of program maturity or executive sponsorship. Activities such as maintaining regular contact with analysts, arranging site visits, and hosting analyst days are used to build long-term trust and transparency.

==== Organizational placement ====
Reporting lines for Analyst Relations vary by company. Surveys indicate that many AR functions sit within marketing or corporate communications, while others are aligned with product marketing, investor relations, or strategy teams. In larger vendors, AR programs may report into marketing at the operational level while maintaining dotted-line accountability to senior executives because of their role in market intelligence and competitive positioning.

The 2024 Spotlight survey found that securing executive sponsorship was one of the most frequently cited challenges for AR teams, suggesting that organizational visibility is as critical as reporting structure.

=== Trends and future direction ===
Analyst Relations (AR) continues to adapt to changes in technology markets and enterprise buying behavior. Surveys and practitioner commentary suggest several notable trends.

One area of change is the growing influence of generative AI on technology discovery. As large language models (LLMs) such as ChatGPT, Claude, Copilot, and Gemini become common entry points for business-to-business (B2B) research, AR teams are considering how analysts’ work intersects with AI-driven discovery platforms. Babel PR reported in 2024 that analyst and industry reports were the most influential channel for 58% of IT decision-makers, indicating that analyst perspectives continue to shape purchasing decisions.

Practitioner sources have introduced the term “Influence Orchestration” to describe coordinating analyst engagement with related visibility channels—such as peer-review platforms, online communities, and AI-driven search—so that trusted signals reinforce one another. Commentary from Spotlight Analyst Relations also emphasizes that integrating analyst insights with peer-review data and monitoring how information is surfaced in AI environments is becoming part of AR practice.

Optimization for answer engines and generative search has also emerged as a topic. Concepts such as Answer engine optimization (AEO) and Generative Engine Optimization (GEO) are discussed in marketing literature as methods for structuring content so that AI systems surface it in responses. For AR teams, this can include ensuring that analyst research and customer evidence are presented in ways that are scannable and referenced by generative tools.

Alongside these digital developments, surveys and commentary continue to note other trends: the rising visibility of independent analysts and influencer-analysts, the strategic role of customer review platforms such as G2 and Gartner Peer Insights, and the challenge of maintaining analyst relationships in increasingly competitive coverage landscapes.

Together, these trends suggest that AR is likely to continue broadening from a communications function into a strategic, cross-functional discipline. Its remit now extends beyond analyst briefings to managing visibility in generative AI ecosystems, cultivating credibility signals in peer reviews and communities, and integrating real-time feedback into corporate strategy.

=== Community engagement ===
Professional communities have played a role in the development of Analyst Relations (AR) as a discipline. The Institute of Industry Analyst Relations (IIAR>), founded in 2006, is a non-profit membership organization for AR practitioners from both in-house and agency teams. Membership is not open to industry analysts, reflecting the association’s focus on practitioner networking, training, and recognition programs such as the annual IIAR> Awards.

Several recurring industry events provide opportunities for AR practitioners to share practices and discuss trends. Spotlight Analyst Relations hosts the annual AR Summit. ARInsights organizes the AR Engage webinar series and the in-person AR Engage Live event. The Product Marketing Alliance (PMA) includes AR-focused workshops and conference tracks. Knowledge Capital Group (KCG) convenes KCG Connects, an annual hybrid conference, and also maintains the AR Tribe, a peer community of practitioners. Constellation Research hosts the invite-only Analyst Relations Experience (ARX), which combines peer exchange sessions and panels.

Online and social platforms also support informal practitioner communities. The #ARchat hashtag on LinkedIn is used for ongoing discussion, while other forums include dedicated LinkedIn groups, Slack channels, and practitioner blogs. These groups provide opportunities for knowledge sharing but do not operate as formal associations.

== Measurement and impact ==
The effectiveness of Analyst Relations (AR) programs is often evaluated through a combination of qualitative and quantitative measures. Traditional approaches focused on tracking the number of analyst briefings, report mentions, and inclusion in comparative evaluations such as Magic Quadrants or Waves. More recently, practitioners and consultancies have emphasized business-aligned metrics such as analyst sentiment, share of recommendations, and evidence of influence on sales opportunities or competitive positioning.

Surveys indicate that AR teams are increasingly expected to demonstrate impact in terms of revenue contribution and executive decision support. For example, Spotlight’s 2024 survey of AR professionals reported that relationship quality, program maturity, and securing executive sponsorship were viewed as critical success factors, reflecting a shift toward outcomes rather than activity counts. Measurement practices often include analyst perception audits, analysis of share of voice within research publications, and tracking analyst comments that influence buyer shortlists and procurement decisions.

Despite advances in measurement, analysts and practitioners note challenges in attributing specific business outcomes to AR activities. Buyers are influenced by multiple factors, and the relative weight of analyst input can be difficult to isolate. As a result, AR metrics are often interpreted in combination with broader marketing and sales indicators rather than as standalone measures of success.

=== Challenges ===
Analyst Relations (AR) programs face several recurring challenges. One is the limited availability of analyst time and attention. Research firms often cover hundreds of vendors within a market, and analysts can allocate only a fraction of their schedule to vendor briefings and inquiries. AR teams therefore compete to secure visibility in crowded coverage areas and must prioritize which analysts to engage.

Budget and organizational support are also common constraints. Surveys report that AR professionals frequently identify executive sponsorship and resourcing as critical factors for program maturity, with underinvestment limiting the ability to scale activities or influence business strategy.

Analyst objectivity and vendor advocacy can also create tension. Analysts have emphasized that poorly prepared or overly promotional briefings damage credibility, while practitioners note ongoing debates about whether commercial relationships affect research visibility.

This concern is often described as the “pay-for-play” perception. Commentaries from AR practitioners and analysts stress that while vendors may feel pressured to purchase subscriptions or reprints, leading analyst firms state that inclusion in major research reports is based on market relevance and analyst judgment rather than payment. These perspectives frame pay-for-play as a perception issue rather than a formal practice.

=== Certifications and training programs ===
Analyst Relations (AR) is not a licensed profession and has no universal certification or governing body. However, a number of associations, consultancies, and analyst firms provide training programs aimed at codifying AR skills.

The Institute of Industry Analyst Relations (IIAR>), founded in 2006, offers workshops and training for practitioners and agencies, including an AR certification program. Knowledge Capital Group (KCG) runs the Analyst Relations Practitioner Training, which leads to the Certified Industry Analyst Relations Professional (CIARP) qualification.

Some analyst firms also provide structured AR learning. Forrester Research offers the Crafting Analyst Relations Certification, a course covering AR fundamentals and strategy.

Training is also incorporated into broader marketing curricula. ARInsights provides platform-focused training on managing interactions and workflows in its ARchitect software. The Product Marketing Alliance (PMA) includes AR modules in its product marketing certification programs, reflecting AR’s overlap with go-to-market strategy.

These programs vary in focus and scope, but collectively reflect efforts to standardize skills and professional development in Analyst Relations.

== See also ==
- Industry analyst
- Market research
