= Software Advice =

American software review and advisory company

- Type: Subsidiary
- Traded as: NYSE: IT
- Founded: 2005 (as River Guide, Inc.)
- Founders: Don Fornes; Austin Merritt
- Headquarters: Austin, Texas; United States
- Key people: Blake Clark (General Manager); Don Fornes
- Parent: G2
- Website: www.softwareadvice.com

Software Advice is a company that provides advisory services, research, and user reviews on software applications for businesses in over 300 market categories including medical, CRM, HR, construction, business intelligence and marketing automation. The service is free to software buyers, and the company is paid by the software vendors to which it refers them.

Co-founded in 2005 by CEO Don Fornes and Austin Merritt, it was a subsidiary of Gartner from 2014 until 2026. Under Gartner it was operated alongside the comparison sites Capterra and GetApp as part of the division Gartner Digital Markets. In February 2026, all three sites were sold to the Chicago-based review platform G2.

== History ==
=== Founding and early years ===
Software Advice, Inc., formerly known as River Guide, Inc., was co-founded in 2005 in San Francisco, California by CEO Don Fornes and Austin Merritt, the company's former general manager and COO. The company provides advice on different software for buyers in several verticals: construction, medical, retail, property, manufacturing, distribution, electronic health record, CRM, applicant tracking systems, and more. In 2009, the company's headquarters moved to Austin, Texas.

=== Gartner ownership (2014–2026) ===
In March 2014, Software Advice was acquired by Gartner, Inc., a global information technology research and advisory company. The company employed about 100 people at the time. Gartner paid $103.2 million in cash at closing and was obliged to pay up to a further $31.9 million. Software Advice was the first of three comparison sites Gartner bought for the division it named Gartner Digital Markets. It acquired GetApp in July 2015 and Capterra in September 2015.

The company announced Blake Clark as its new general manager in November 2018.

=== Acquisition by G2 (2026) ===
In January 2026, G2, a Chicago-based software insights platform company, announced that it had reached an agreement to acquire Software Advice along with two other Gartner-owned companies, Capterra and GetApp. The sale closed on 5 February 2026.

== Business model ==
Software Advice does not charge software buyers for access and software recommendations, and earns its revenue from software vendors on a pay-per-lead basis. Its advisors conduct a needs analysis with a prospective buyer, and vendors whose products match the buyer's requirements are charged for the referral. Vendors can bid for leads by industry and by buying organization's size.

== Product ==
The company advises buyers on software products via free telephone consultations with software advisors. The Software Advice website gives pricing and demo information on individual systems, as well as market reports based on buyer interactions, and detailed reviews and comparisons. The company's reports have been used as a source of expertise in Forbes, Entrepreneur, Huffington Post, Business Insider, Yelp, Inc., and the Wall Street Journal among others.

=== Reports ===
Software Advice releases biannual reports to highlight top software products in different categories. Its FrontRunners for Enterprise Resource Planning (ERP), April 2019 report analyzed the software that companies use to track information such as inventory management, accounting, and customer relationship management. In the report, Software Advice analyzed data to plot the market’s top ERP products graphically, based on Usability and User Recommended. The other FrontRunners reports also base scores on Usability and User Recommended.

Under the methodology from January 2026, products are scored on two dimensions: usability, which combines functionality and ease of use, and customer satisfaction, which combines value, support and likelihood to recommend. To be eligible a product must have at least 20 user reviews published within the 24 months preceding the analysis period, of which at least 10 must fall in the most recent 12 months. Reviews are drawn from the Software Advice website, Capterra website, and getapp.com.

== See also ==
- Capterra
- G2
- Comparison shopping website
- Lead generation
