= Gartner hype cycle =

Graphical presentation of the maturity of specific technologies

Hype cycle

The Gartner hype cycle is a graphical presentation to represent the maturity, adoption, and social application of specific technologies. The hype cycle's veracity has been largely disputed, with studies pointing to it being inconsistently true at best.

== History ==
The hype cycle framework was introduced in 1995 by Gartner analyst Jackie Fenn, who had joined the firm the year before. In her research reports, Fenn identified common patterns related to the maturity of emerging technologies. Fenn referred to this familiar progression as a "hype cycle" and created a graph depicting its ups and downs with each distinct stage given a title, starting with Technology trigger and ending with Plateau of productivity. The chart was included in a one-off research report, but it was popular with other Gartner analysts and clients and the "Hype Cycle of Emerging Technologies" was soon developed into an annual report.

== Five phases ==
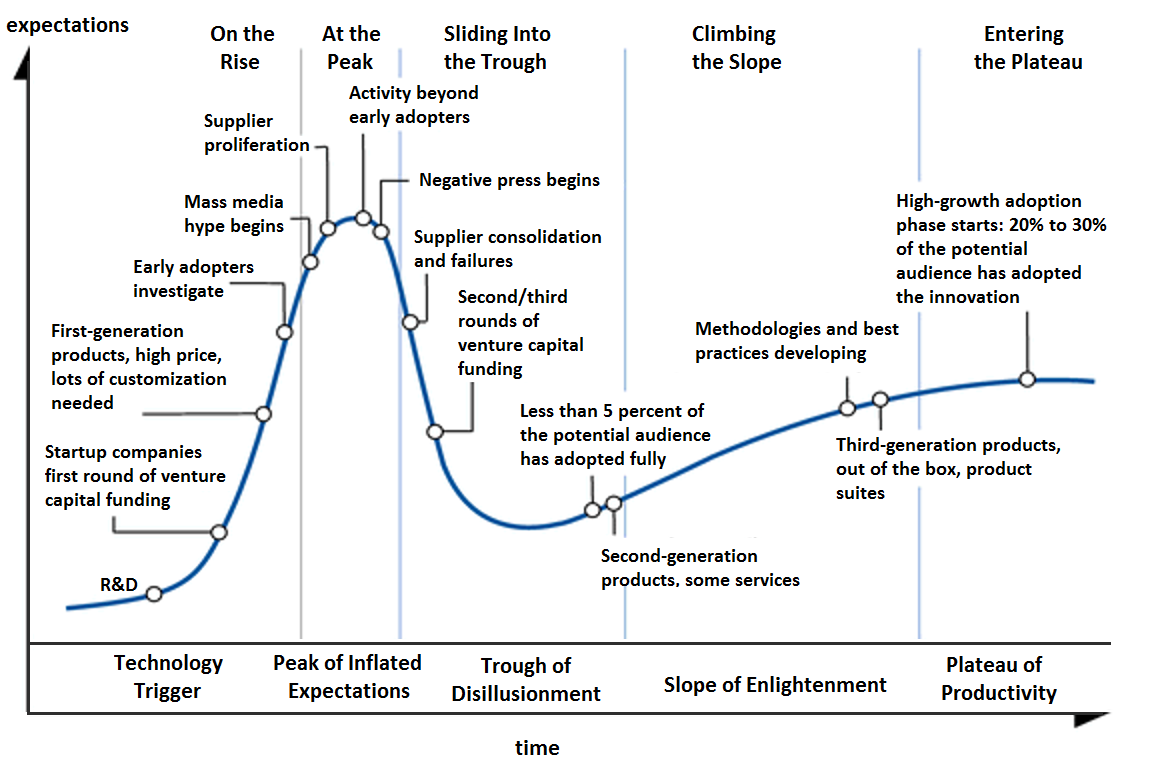
General hype cycle for technology

Each hype cycle consists of five key phases of a technology's life cycle.

1. Technology trigger
A potential technology breakthrough kicks things off. Early proof-of-concept stories and media interest trigger significant publicity. Often no usable products exist and commercial viability is unproven.
2. Peak of inflated expectations
Early publicity produces a number of success stories—often accompanied by scores of failures. Some companies take action; most do not.
3. Trough of disillusionment
Interest wanes as experiments and implementations fail to deliver. Producers of the technology shake out or fail. Investment continues only if the surviving providers improve their products to the satisfaction of early adopters.
4. Slope of enlightenment
More instances of the technology's benefits start to crystallize and become more widely understood. Second- and third-generation products appear from technology providers. More enterprises fund pilots; conservative companies remain cautious.
5. Plateau of productivity
Mainstream adoption starts to take off. Criteria for assessing provider viability are more clearly defined. The technology's broad market applicability and relevance are clearly paying off. If the technology has more than a niche market, then it will continue to grow.

The term "hype cycle" and each of the associated phases are now used more broadly in the marketing of new technologies.

== Hype in new media ==
Hype (in the more general media sense of the term "hype") has played a large part in the adoption of new media. Analyses of the Internet in the 1990s featured large amounts of hype, and that created "debunking" responses. A longer-term historical perspective on such cycles can be found in the research of the economist Carlota Perez. Desmond Roger Laurence, in the field of clinical pharmacology, described a similar process in drug development in the seventies.

== Criticisms of the model ==
There have been numerous criticisms of the hype cycle model. Prominent among them are that it is not a cycle, that the outcome does not depend on the nature of the technology itself, that it is not scientific in nature, and that it does not reflect changes over time in the speed at which technology develops. Another is that it is limited in its application, as it prioritizes economic considerations in decision-making processes. It seems to assume that a business' performance is tied to the hype cycle, whereas this may actually have more to do with the way a company devises its branding strategy. A related criticism is that the "cycle" has no real benefits to the development or marketing of new technologies and merely comments on pre-existing trends. Specific disadvantages when compared to, for example, technology readiness level are:

- The cycle is not scientific in nature, and there is no data or analysis that would justify the cycle.
- With the (subjective) terms disillusionment, enlightenment and expectations it cannot be described objectively or clearly where technology now really is.
- Even if public expectations of technologies follow rise-fall-recovery patterns indistinguishable from the cycle, the full process including the recovery phase (slope of enlightenment) may be driven by social process, independent of technology maturity or diffusion.
- The terms are misleading in the sense that one gets the wrong idea what they can use a technology for. The user does not want to be disappointed, so should they stay away from technology in the Trough of Disillusionment?
- No action perspective is offered to move technology to a next phase.
- This appears to be a very simplified impulse response of an elastic system representable by a differential equation. Perhaps more telling would be to formulate a system model with solutions conforming to observable behavior.

An analysis of Gartner Hype Cycles since 2000 shows that few technologies actually travel through an identifiable hype cycle, and that in practice most of the important technologies adopted since 2000 were not identified early in their adoption cycles.

The Economist researched the hype cycle in 2024:

We find, in short, that the cycle is a rarity. Tracing breakthrough technologies over time, only a small share—perhaps a fifth—move from innovation to excitement to despondency to widespread adoption. Lots of tech becomes widely used without such a rollercoaster ride. Others go from boom to bust, but do not come back. We estimate that of all the forms of tech which fall into the trough of disillusionment, six in ten do not rise again.

== See also ==
- AI winter – Period of reduced funding and interest in AI research
- Dunning–Kruger effect – Cognitive bias about one's own skill
- Kondratiev wave – Hypothesized cycle-like phenomena in the modern world economy
- Product lifecycle – Duration of processing of products
- Roy Amara – American researcher and scientist (1925-2007)
- Stock market bubble – Economic bubble in a stock market
- Transient response – Response of a system to a change from an equilibrium state
- Tulip mania – 17th-century economic bubble in the Netherlands
- Uncanny valley – Hypothesis that human replicas elicit revulsion
