= Learning Experience Platform =

A Learning Experience Platform (LXP) is a type of online learning system that focuses on the user's skills and learning experience rather than just courses. Instead of a Learning Management System (LMS), which is primarily focused on the distribution of courses to users, the Learning Experience Platform offers a more customized learning journey based on their skill gaps and needs. In addition, an LMS has a number of shortfalls such as content dumping, outdated user experience, and limited features. The end user for an LXP can be students, corporate employees, vendors, customers or anyone who has to learn new skills.

== Purpose ==
An LXP intendeds to transform students from passive recipients of information into active contributors of knowledge and the environment combines elements from the areas of gamification, blended learning, mobile learning, and spaced repetition. An LXP can be used with ready-made content from publishers or with self-created content. The ready-made courses include assignments on textbooks and textbooks from textbook publishers.

== Learning Pathways ==
Student's navigate around the platform in their social context with fellow learners, while teachers can interact with them and, for example, view their learning progress. The learning units are divided into small learning units practicing micro learning. Learners collect rewards in a course by completing tasks in the micro learning unit. Points are awarded according to a gamification principles and more valuable rewards are collected by time-delayed repetition (interleaving). Learners can study in the free practice mode, complete homework by a deadline or complete learning controls in the exam mode. Teachers see the learning progress and learning analytics of their learners, can give homework, answer questions from learners, as well as create tests and worksheets and print certificates.
