= Capterra =

Online marketplace vendor

- Website type: Private company
- Available in: Multiple language
- Founded: 1999; 27 years ago
- Founders: Michael Ortner; Rakesh Chilakapati
- Industry: Online marketplace; Software; B2B
- Parent: G2
- Website: www.capterra.com
- Current status: Active

Capterra, Inc. is a software review and discovery website. It operates as an online marketplace and directory that acts as an intermediary between software buyers and the vendors that sell it, publishing product listings, user reviews and comparison research.

The company generates its revenue from software vendors, using a pay-per-click model in which vendors can bid on the basis of software category and listing position, alongside unpaid listings ranked using user reviews.

The company was founded in 1999 by Michael Ortner and Rakesh Chilakapati and remained independent until 2015, when it was acquired by the research and advisory firm Gartner. Gartner operated Capterra alongside the comparison sites Software Advice and GetApp under the banner Gartner Digital Markets. In January 2026 Gartner agreed to sell all three sites to the Chicago-based review platform G2; the sale closed the following month.

== History ==
=== Founding and early years ===
The company was founded in 1999 by Michael Ortner and Rakesh Chilakapati. Capterra was initially intended to let businesses rent software from vendors through its website. About six months after launch the company abandoned that plan in favor of a directory that was free to buyers and charged vendors for exposure and sales leads. It subsequently adopted a pay-per-click charging model. Capterra was on the list of the Inc. magazine's 2007 ranking of the 500 fastest-growing private U.S. companies. By the end of 2007, there were nearly 10,000 software vendors advertised on the website. In 2009, the site allowed software users to leave reviews.

By 2014, The Washington Post described the company as "the Yelp of business software", reporting that it had grown into one of the larger business-to-business directories on the web while retaining a small-company culture at its Arlington offices.

=== Gartner ownership (2015–2026) ===
In September 2015, Capterra was acquired by Gartner for $206.2 million. The purchase followed Gartner's 2014 acquisition of the comparison site Software Advice and its acquisition on 1 July 2015 of Nubera eBusiness, the Barcelona-based operator of the software directory GetApp. Capterra was subsequently grouped with Software Advice and GetApp under the division Gartner Digital Markets.

In January 2023, Capterra announced it had reached 2 million verified software reviews.

=== Acquisition by G2 (2026) ===
In January 2026, G2, a Chicago-based software insights platform company, announced plans to acquire Capterra along with two other Gartner-owned companies, Software Advice and GetApp. G2 stated that the combined business would hold close to six million user reviews and reach more than 200 million software buyers annually. The acquisition closed on February 5, 2026.

== Business model ==
Capterra does not charge software buyers for access. Its revenue comes from software vendors, who may list their products without charge and pay on a pay-per-click basis to appear in sponsored positions. Category pages combine these paid placements with unpaid listings ordered using user ratings and review volume. Vendors are also charged for sales leads generated through the site.

== Reviews and ratings ==
Capterra has accepted user-submitted reviews since 2009. Reviewers are asked to verify their identity, and the company states that reviews are screened by human moderators together with automated checks for plagiarism and machine-generated text. Capterra also states that reviewers may be offered nominal incentives, such as gift cards, and that reviews collected in this way are labelled with a "reviewer source" indicator.

The site publishes periodic "Capterra Shortlist" reports, which rank products in a software category by user ratings and popularity. Products appearing in a report may display a corresponding badge.

== Research and surveys ==
In 2018, Capterra conducted a Top Tech Trends survey on how small businesses manage technology investments and consider project management software.

In 2020, Capterra conducted a series of surveys to analyze the impact of the COVID-19 pandemic on the software business, including digital payments and tech industry employment.

In 2023, Capterra published survey research on the outcomes of business software purchasing decisions.

== Recognition ==
- Inc. 5000 Fastest Growing Private Business 2007-2009, placing 463rd in 2007, 1,348th in 2008 and 1,722nd in 2009
- Radius.com Best B2B Holiday Marketing Campaigns 2013
- Interactive Media Award for Outstanding Achievement in the Software Industry, 2008 and 2009
- Ranked #25 on the Virginia Chamber of Commerce Fantastic 50, 2007, with four-year revenue growth of 282 per cent on revenue of $3.6 million

== See also ==
- G2
- Software Advice
- Business-to-business
- Pay per click
