= National democracy (Marxism–Leninism) =

Marxist–Leninist concept

National democracy is a Marxist–Leninist theoretical concept that chiefly encompasses three processes: the national liberation struggle, the national democratic revolution and the national democratic state. The first process focuses on the establishment of a state formation through a national liberation struggle. The second process covers the national democratic revolution, how revolutionaries seize power in the newly-independent state. The last process deals with how a national democratic state can transition the society it controls from the pre-capitalist or capitalist mode of production to the socialist mode of production, in a bid to establish a communist state formation known as the socialist state.

The national democratic theory has also spawned concepts unique to certain states. For example, the official ideology of the African National Congress in South Africa is the national democratic revolution.

== Theoretical origins ==
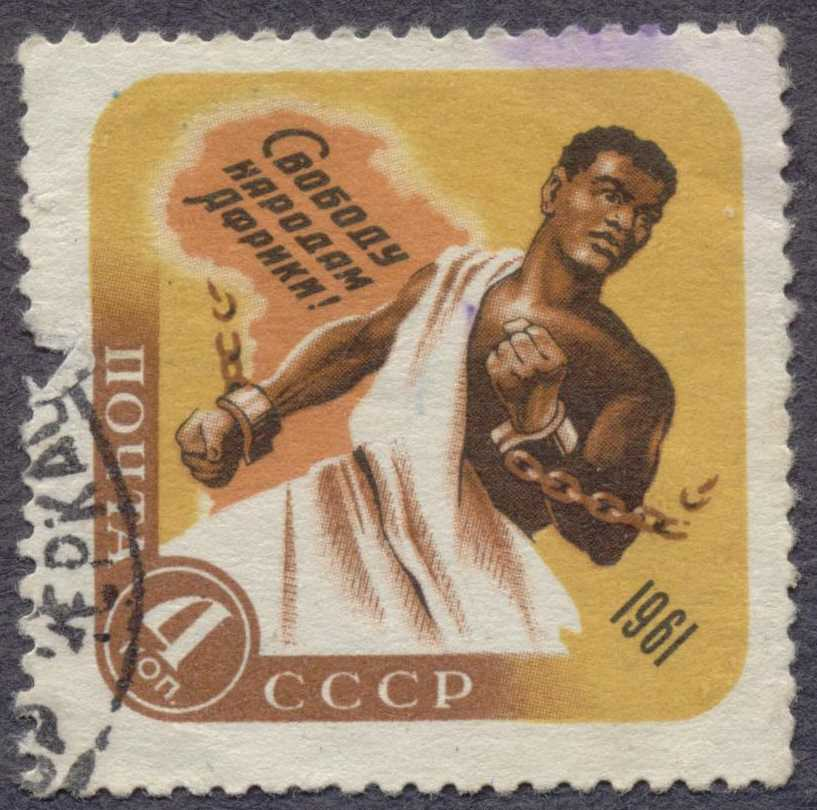
A Soviet stamp that reads, "Freedom to the peoples of Africa!"

After World War II, the Western world was divided into two blocs: a capitalist bloc led by the United States and a communist bloc headed by the Soviet Union. In response to the decolonisation of the Third World and the rise of national liberation movements in the post-World War II era, Soviet theorists aimed to develop a coherent ideological and policy framework to address these developments. During the 19th Congress of the Communist Party of the Soviet Union (CPSU) in 1952, the initial ideas that would evolve into the theory of national democracy were introduced. At this congress, party leaders informed the delegates that the world was divided into three blocs: a communist bloc, a capitalist bloc, and a third bloc of uncommitted states. For the world revolution to be successful, the communist bloc needed to bring the uncommitted states to their side. Four years later, during the 20th CPSU Congress in 1956, Nikita Khrushchev, the first secretary of the CPSU Central Committee, announced that the communist bloc had united with the group of non-aligned nations to create a "zone of peace."

The policy change led the Soviet Union to concentrate on fostering positive relationships with states they viewed as anti-imperialist and bourgeois nationalist. This included Gamal Abdel Nasser's Egypt and Jawaharlal Nehru's India. The Soviet Union prioritised these diplomatic relationships over assisting local communist parties in those countries in their efforts to gain power. During the 21st CPSU Congress in 1961, Khrushchev criticised these states for repressing communist activities. He stated that even with this problem, the Soviet Union would persist in offering foreign assistance to those states.

In the late 1950s, the CPSU Central Committee established a special group led by Karen Brutents, an official in the International Department of the CPSU Central Committee. The group drafted party policies and speeches for key leaders concerning the national liberation struggle in the Third World and national democracy. They submitted these drafts to the CPSU Secretariat, the highest executive organ of the CPSU Central Committee, for approval. Once approved, they became official party line. It was not until 1960, at the International Meeting of Communist and Workers Parties, held in Moscow, that the term national democracy became official policy of the Soviet-led world communist movement. By the 1970s, national democracy had developed into a coherent theoretical system. Several academic research institutes studied Soviet national liberation theory and how it worked in practice, according to scholar Irina Filatova. They produced hundreds of books, thousands of theses, and many articles on different aspects of this topic.

National democracy is closely related to two other concepts: revolutionary democracy and socialist orientation, also referred to as a "non-capitalist way of development”. The Soviet academic journal, Africa: Problems of Socialist Orientation, defined revolutionary democracy as a social group that represented the anti-imperialist, anti-feudal, democratic, and socialist goals of various working people in states at the pre-capitalist and early-capitalist stages of development. Socialist orientation was introduced in 1960 at the Moscow summit. It refers to a way of development that is not based on capitalism. This concept is seen as a first step toward socialism in countries where people reject capitalism but where the material conditions are not yet ready for a socialist revolution.

== National liberation struggle ==
Soviet theorists viewed the national liberation movements that participated in the national liberation struggle as reflections of the material base, the natural and economic foundation of the given society, present in their societies, in accordance with the Marxist–Leninist materialist interpretation of history. Soviet theorists posited that numerous countries in the Third World were in the early stages of establishing class societies, meaning economically advanced societies. Rostislav Ulyanovsky, deputy head of the CPSU International Department, argued that these societies displayed a pre-capitalist and primarily pre-feudal social structure. This underlying structure was superficially concealed by bourgeois relations, which mainly developed in the areas of commodity production and money circulation.

Karen Brutents agreed with Ulyanovsky, highlighting that these societies were founded on family and tribal connections, caste biases, and religious affiliations rather than class relations. This posed a significant problem, as individuals exhibited a stronger attachment to what Brutents considered outdated social ideas, such as tribes, instead of recognising the real, shared material conditions they were experiencing. While admitting that traditional class categories lacked relevance in the context they were used, it is clear that Soviet theorists strongly favoured classical Marxist terms—such as national bourgeoisie, petty bourgeoisie, intelligentsia, peasantry, and proletariat—when studying the material base of the colonial state.

=== National bourgeoisie ===
Soviet theorists posited that the national bourgeoisie in the Third World had distinct characteristics compared to the classical bourgeoisie found in Western societies. Understanding these differences, they posited, could provide valuable insights into the material base of these states. They reasoned that the national bourgeoisie differed from the Western bourgeoisie in that they were not capitalist owners and, therefore, were not exploiting the working masses.

The national bourgeoisie worked mostly in trade, services, money exchange, and lending; what Soviet Marxist–Leninists would often call nothing more than petty bourgeoisie tradesmen. Soviet Marxist–Leninists believed they took a role akin to the petty bourgeoisie tradesmen in the West. They concluded that the low level of historical development in these states was a significant factor. Additionally, the fact that the largest enterprises were owned and operated by Western capitalists diminished the influence of the local bourgeoisie and marginalised it as a class.

The dominance of foreign capital over the means of production hindered the national bourgeoisie from establishing itself as a separate social class, as Western capitalists typically exploited their limited resources. The discriminatory policies enforced by the colonial state also made the national bourgeoisie more positive towards the idea of national liberation. Soviet theorists maintained that due to oppression by foreign capital and the colonial state, the national bourgeoisie, rather than upholding the existing order, became active participants in the struggle for national liberation.

However, there was still widespread disagreement within the Soviet foreign policy establishment on how one should understand the motives of the national bourgeoisie. Vadim Zagladin and Fedor Ryzhenko, two theorists, believed that they took part in the national liberation struggle since they did not want to share their profits with foreign imperialists. Although this was the more conservative viewpoint, most others held a more moderate position. Ulyanovsky believed that the national bourgeoisie had a vested interest in the struggle, but they often linked national liberation to their own class interests. Bobodzhan Gafurov, who headed the Oriental Institute at the USSR Academy of Sciences, argued in a paper, prepared under the guidance of Pyotr Fedoseyev, that the revolutionary potential of the national bourgeoisie was merely an illusion. He claimed that this class acted solely for its own benefit. Due to its small size and perceived self-interests, many Soviet analysts overlooked the national bourgeoisie as a social class.

Nevertheless, the official party line remained as articulated by Brutents, who reasoned that the national bourgeoisie faced a contradiction. On one end, they aimed to improve their material and political conditions by establishing an independent national state, enhancing economic conditions, creating a national market, and gaining control of it. However, their desires conflicted with the goals of the colonial state. This contradiction determined the national bourgeoisie's involvement in the fight for liberation, Brutents believed.

=== Petty bourgeoisie ===
The petty bourgeoisie, unlike the national bourgeoisie, was seen by Soviet ideologues as having revolutionary potential. However, Soviet theorists never reached a common understanding of what the petty bourgeoisie was, according to scholar Galia Golan. Some theorists placed the petty bourgeoisie within the intermediate strata, while others proposed that the intermediate strata were an internal group within the urban petty bourgeoisie. Furthermore, some theorists regarded the rural petty bourgeoisie as part of the intermediate strata as well, while others saw all these class categories as related yet separate.

As noted by Ulyanovsky, the misclassification arose from early Soviet theorists who categorised the left-leaning intelligentsia and the military as part of the national bourgeoisie. Brutents highlighted a similar but distinct anomaly, where earlier Soviet theorists classified small traders and independent farmers as a pre-capitalist phenomenon rather than as part of the petty bourgeoisie. Yevgeny Primakov, the head of the Institute for World Economy and International Relations at the USSR Academy of Social Sciences, noted that earlier classifications grouped clerks, intellectuals, and military personnel with traders, artisans, and small producers. However, he opined, these groups had different relationships with the means of production and could not, therefore, be members of the same class. Primakov argued that the intermediary strata and petty bourgeoisie were distinct groups, believing it was incorrect to merge these two categories.

Soviet theorists believed that the petty bourgeoisie, which includes tradespeople, small business owners, artisans, and minor producers, often earned low incomes. In some cases, these individuals were even worse off financially than the proletariat. Consequently, they believed that this group was inherently against imperialism. According to Brutents, the petty bourgeoisie joined the struggle because of colonial oppression, exploitation, and damaging competition from foreign countries. They also faced pressure from wealthy compradors and moneylenders.

Even with these advantageous characteristics, the petty bourgeoisie, as part of the bourgeoisie, were perceived to possess a dual nature. In contrast to the proletariat, which had an inherent tendency to resist capitalism and imperialism, the petty bourgeoisie, due to their connection with private capitalist property, developed a bourgeois mindset and social values that justified capitalism.

Yet, in colonial states, the petty bourgeoisie frequently occupied the roles of both owners and workers simultaneously, leading them to often empathize with the proletariat's struggles. Furthermore, as a significant portion of the petty bourgeoisie had either been peasants or hailed from peasant backgrounds, they felt connected to their struggles. This caused Brutents to claim that the petty bourgeoisie were custodians of tribal, religious, and caste values: outdated values that were opposed to both capitalism and communism. This position was influenced by Vladimir Lenin, who stated that the petty bourgeoisie in the national liberation struggle carried "prejudices, reactionary fantasies, weaknesses, and errors."

Due to their inherent self-interests, the petty bourgeoisie was believed to foster groups of collaborators of capitalism and imperialism. Soviet theorists believed that the petty bourgeoisie often shifted between the bourgeoisie's interests and the proletariat's. Although they hosted radical thinkers who followed ideas from non-Marxist socialism and nationalism, few of them fully embraced Marxism–Leninism. Nonetheless, they were considered an essential ally of the proletariat in the national liberation struggle and in forming a national democratic state.

=== The intelligentsia ===
Soviet theorists believed the intelligentsia, part of the intermediate strata or petty bourgeoisie, had significant independence from other class formations. For instance, Georgy Kim, who thought they belonged to the lower and middle strata, mentioned that the intelligentsia was primarily made up of white-collar proletarians. Brutents, conversely, held the view that the intelligentsia consisted of affluent elites, encompassing individuals from free professions, technicians, and bureaucrats (such as clerks or civil servants working for the colonial administration). Unexpectedly, from a Marxist perspective, Soviet theorists paid minimal attention to the material base of the intelligentsia because of their assumed independence.

The intelligentsia held significant importance in society due to their literacy in a predominantly illiterate population, according to Brutents. They effectively maintained a monopoly over education and cultural knowledge, shaping the intellectual landscape of their community. Individuals within the intelligentsia often had relationships with various social classes, reflecting their diverse backgrounds and experiences. Many of them came from families with elite tribal and aristocratic status within traditional societal structures. Consequently, they often maintained close connections with colonial administrations and military institutions. It was also thought to be closely associated with the national bourgeoisie, from which it emerged, as well as with the petty bourgeoisie, which had very comparable material conditions.

Igor Andreyev, a researcher at the Institute of World Politics of the Academy of Social Sciences, argued that one should distinguish between the intelligentsia and the petty bourgeoisie. The petty bourgeoisie ran private capitalist businesses, while the intelligentsia did not; that is, their material basis was different. The intelligentsia, unlike the petty bourgeoisie, did not adopt capitalist values like profit-seeking. Andreyev believed they often understood and sympathized with the working masses, even seeing things from their perspective in many cases.

Andreyev and Brutents suggested that the inherent radicalism of the intelligentsia can be linked to their position within the colonial state. The colonial state needed administrators in the form of clerks and civil servants. During their training, the intelligentsia were exposed to progressive ideas. Individuals in the colonial state frequently traveled back to the home country and, through these visits, were often confronted with the grim realities of the colonial system. This experience sparked a kind of national consciousness, leading to the emergence of nationalism. Consequently, the colonial state's education of the intelligentsia ended up undermining their own state, effectively creating its own gravediggers, they believed.

The intelligentsia, drawing on their experiences in the colonial state, were regarded as the class with the most significant political expertise during the national liberation struggle. Their insights and understanding of political dynamics made them a key force in advocating for change and guiding the nation toward national independence. Brutents asserts that the intelligentsia assumed the role of organisers and played an active part in the fight for national liberation. Kim believed that they served as representatives of the collective national aspirations for independence, social justice, and opposition to capitalism.

=== Military ===
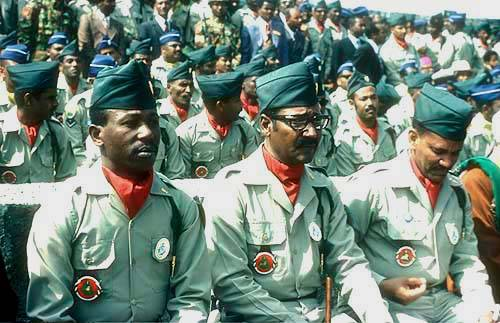
In Ethiopia, the military took power in 1974 and established the Derg that initiated a national democratic revolution. From left to right (in front row): Mengistu Haile Mariam, Tafari Benti and Atnafu Abate.

Most Soviet theorists viewed the military in a way similar to the intelligentsia. They even suggested that the local military officers formed a class or sub-class they called the "military intelligentsia." According to Galia Golan, Soviet theorists often grouped certain characteristics under the term intelligentsia. This group was usually divided into civil and military intelligentsia. Overall, the traits of these two categories were often very similar or even identical. For instance, Ulyanovsky contended that both the civilian intelligentsia and the military shared an identical social background, education, mindset, and practical experience, which connected them regardless of specific material social forces, status, or classes.

This position was challenged, chiefly by the Soviet military. A study led by Vasily Zhukov provided the first academic response to this viewpoint. It aimed to explain why the military often got involved in the national liberation struggle in the first place. Military officers and personnel, like the intelligentsia, received education from the colonial state since it needed a well-educated staff to operate effectively. They were exposed to progressive ideas through their education and travels to the home country, both facilitated and organized by the colonial state.

Unlike the civilian intelligentsia, military personnel were often enlisted to fight in their home country's imperialistic wars. They were employed to quell local disturbances and unrest in the colonies. Military personnel developed a sense of national consciousness by participating in this oppression. The colonial state hindered the progress of indigenous leaders by assigning top positions to individuals from the home country.

This practice weakened the loyalty of indigenous military personnel towards the colonial rulers. Due to this, Soviet theorist Georgy Mirsky argued, "no one feels the backwardness of the state as acutely as an officer." Mirsky argued that a military officer's national awakening began when he realised that his country was lagging behind the rest of the world. This growing sense of national consciousness and pride motivated him to join the liberation struggle to end colonial rule. Zhukov agreed and asserted that the military possessed significant revolutionary potential because of its structured organisation: it could create a cohesive group that aimed for revolutionary transformation.

=== Peasantry ===
The peasantry was believed to be the largest class formation in Third World societies, and as such, could not be ignored by communists and national democrats. This was accepted orthodoxy, and even Leonid Brezhnev, the general secretary of the CPSU Central Committee, accepted it as a basic fact. The peasantry as a class was generally perceived to have great revolutionary potential by Soviet analysts such as Ulyanovsky, mostly due to the semi-feudal conditions they were forced to live in. It was generally believed that they were most oppressed class in colonial society and had the most to win in the national liberation struggle. As Brutents put it, "The peasantry, living and working in arduous conditions, being driven off the land by foreign companies and settlers, subjected to oppression, arbitrary acts and levies by the colonial administration, exploited by the landowners, the tribal elite and the money-lenders, were driven to take part in the national movement, which held out the prospect of obtaining land and a radical improvement of their condition." This oppression produced, according to Ullianovskii, "patriotic feelings of anti-imperialist nationalism."

Nonetheless, Soviet analysts mostly agreed that the peasantry did not form a uniform class. An article in the academic journal, Asia and Africa, argued that the peasantry "was a class composed of smallholders, landless peasants, and agricultural workers." However, others, like Yevgeny Primakov, were skeptical of defining it as a class. His main argument was that in many areas it was close to impossible to divorce what one defined as the peasantry from tribal groupings. While noting that the tribal system was breaking down, this process was slow. It had created several groups with different material interests: "peasants of the tribal system, the feudal system, and the capitalist villages."

=== Proletariat ===
It was generally believed in the Soviet establishment that the proletariat, that is, the working class, was minuscule in these societies. Leading theoreticians, such as Brutents, warned against exaggerating the proletariat's influence in these societies: "One must object, therefore, to the now and again pronounced tendency—apparently for the purpose of emphasising the role of the working class—to argue its large size on the strength of the data concerning the number of wage-workers with an approach similar to that used for the developed capitalist countries."

== National democratic revolution ==
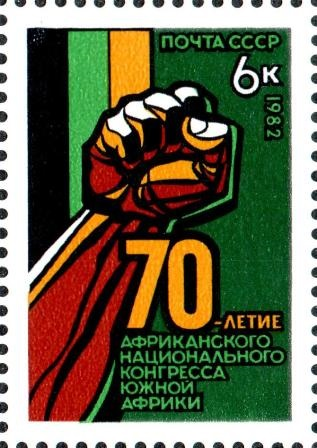
A commemorative Soviet stamp celebrating the 70th anniversary of the founding of the African National Congress (ANC). The ANC, the governing party of South Africa since 1994, has since 1969 been committed to leading a national democratic revolution.

According to academic Irina Filatova, the concept of national democracy suggested that recently formed independent nations could skip capitalism and directly create socialism, meaning establishing the socialist mode of production and a socialist state, in a two-stage process. The first stage was the national liberation struggle (synonymous at this point with the national democratic revolution), and the second stage was the initiation of socialist construction. Soviet theorists recognised that the material base in the colonial states was insufficiently developed, but they held the view that an advanced superstructure could be established in these states through a national democratic revolution. That superstructure could transform their countries into socialist states with the help of the communist bloc and the assistance of world proletarian forces. This, in turn, would level up the material base and hasten the construction of socialism in these states.

== National democratic state ==
The 1960 International Meeting of Communist and Workers Parties, held in Moscow, defined the national democratic state as follows: "[The] political form of the activity of the revolutionary democracy is the national democratic state". What constituted a revolutionary democracy and a national democratic state was, according to scholar Irina Flatova, "so vague that they could be stretched in any direction. Clearly, there were no tangible criteria for a government to be recognised as a revolutionary democracy, and for a country to be considered a national democratic state. But the slogans were attractive, and this was what mattered." Despite this vagueness, Soviet analysts agreed that the national democratic state was "a transitional state towards a state of the socialist type".

The national democratic state was later divided into two types: one for non-communist national democratic states and another for communist national democratic states, which later became known as states of socialist orientation. However, in some circles, the terminology differed. For example, some spoke of "national democratic state of socialist orientation" to imply states without a national democratic front and a revolutionary democratic vanguard party, and others of the people's democratic state of socialist orientation, a state run by a revolutionary democratic vanguard party that was close to the communist bloc. A people's democratic state of socialist orientation was also expected to institute a communist form of government based on democratic centralism and unified power, and establish the institution of supreme state organ of power.
