= List of communist states =

A map of current communist states

A communist state is a form of government that combines the state leadership of a communist party through the supreme state organ of power, Marxism–Leninism or a related political philosophy, and an official commitment to the construction of a communist society. Communism in its modern form grew out of the socialist movement in 19th-century Europe and blamed capitalism for societal miseries. In the 20th century, several communist states were established, first in Russia with the Russian Revolution of 1917 and then in portions of Eastern Europe, Asia, and a few other regions after World War II. The institutions of these states were heavily influenced by the writings of Karl Marx, Friedrich Engels, Vladimir Lenin, Joseph Stalin and others. However, the political reforms of Soviet leader Mikhail Gorbachev known as Perestroika and socio-economic difficulties produced the revolutions of 1989, which brought down all the communist states of the Eastern Bloc bar the Soviet Union. The repercussions of the collapse of these states contributed to political transformations in the Soviet Union and Yugoslavia and several other non-European communist states. Presently, there are five communist states in the world: China, Cuba, Laos, North Korea, and Vietnam.

== Overview ==
=== Socialist states ===
A map of all socialist states in 1980.

In applied communist practice, a socialist state is a communist state formation that is the product of a purported base and superstructural relation that is called the socialist mode of production, or simply socialism. Socialism acts as the base of the socialist state, while the superstructure is made up of two parts: the class character of the state and the organisational form of state power.

- The class character of the state involves the dictatorship of the proletariat (or a variant thereof) in which the proletariat acts as the ruling class; purportedly the most advanced elements of this class form a vanguard party —communist party— to lead the state. The theoretical exception to this rule was the Soviet Union: from 1961 onwards the Communist Party of the Soviet Union (CPSU) argued that it had created a developed socialist society where the proletarian dictatorship had been replaced by a socialist state of the whole people since all the exploitative classes had been defeated. The Chinese Communist Party (CCP) vehemently opposed this theory and argued that every state formation had to have a ruling class.
- The organisational form of state power, literally the form of government in Marxist–Leninist vocabulary, is centered on the unified power of the supreme state organ of power that operates under the guidance of the vanguard party.

The majority of communist states (those who were under the doctrine of "real socialism") have been unable to establish a socialist state. These states had, according to Marxist–Leninist doctrine, reached a lower form of development and designated themselves, or were designated, for example, as national democratic states, states of socialist orientation or as people's democratic states.

Overview of communist states that have self-described as socialist
State	Established	Dissolved	Duration	Leading party	Supreme state organ of power	Ref.
Albania	28 December 1976	29 April 1991	14 years, 122 days	Party of Labour (Note: Named the Communist Party of Albania from 1941 until 1948.)	People's Assembly	
Bulgaria	18 May 1971	12 July 1991	20 years, 55 days	Communist Party	National Assembly	
China	17 November 1975	—	51 years, 3 days	Communist Party	National People's Congress	
Cuba	24 February 1976	—	50 years, 269 days	Communist Party (Note: From 1962 to 1965 the United Party of the Socialist Revolution of Cuba)	National Assembly of People's Power	
Czechoslovakia	11 July 1960	29 March 1990	29 years, 261 days	Communist Party	Federal Assembly	
East Germany	8 April 1968	3 October 1990	22 years, 178 days	Socialist Unity Party	People's Chamber	
Hungary	26 April 1972	23 October 1989	17 years, 180 days	Socialist Workers' Party (Note: From 1948-1956 the Hungarian Working People's Party)	National Assembly	
Mongolia	6 July 1960	12 February 1992	31 years, 221 days	People's Revolutionary Party	People's Great Khural	
North Korea	27 December 1972	—	53 years, 328 days	Workers' Party	Supreme People's Assembly	
Poland	10 February 1976	9 December 1989	13 years, 302 days	United Workers' Party	Sejm	
Romania	21 August 1965	30 December 1989	24 years, 131 days	Communist Party (Note: From 1948-1965 the Romanian Workers' Party)	Great National Assembly	
Somalia	21 October 1969	26 January 1991	21 years, 97 days	Revolutionary Socialist Party	People's Assembly	
Soviet Union	30 December 1922 (Note: The Soviet Union was established on 30 December 1922, but was not declared a socialist state until 5 December 1936, when the second Soviet constitution was adopted. Vladimir Lenin, the first leader of the Soviet Union, was unsure how to categorise the Soviet state. He made it clear that he did not believe either the state or society of the Soviet Union to be socialist. Joseph Stalin, who eventually succeeded Lenin, initiated policies in the late 1920s to create socialism in the Soviet Union. His theory of the socialist state was formulated in the mid-1930s. He claimed that the Soviet Union had become a socialist state in the 1930s, and the constitution formalised it in 1936.)	26 December 1991	68 years, 361 days (Note: If one only counts the period the Soviet Union self-designated as a socialist state, the USSR was socialist for 55 years, 21 days.)	Communist Party	Supreme Soviet	
Vietnam	2 July 1976	—	50 years, 141 days	Communist Party	National Assembly	
Yugoslavia	7 April 1963	27 April 1992	29 years, 20 days	League of Communists (Note: From 1919 to 1952 known as the Communist Party of Yugoslavia)	Assembly	

=== People's democratic states ===
A people's democratic state is a communist state formation. According to the Marxist–Leninist theory of people's democracy, it purportedly tries to transition society from a capitalist mode of production to a socialist mode of production after a successful people's democratic revolution. This process transforms the people's democratic state into a socialist state. According to Marxist–Leninist theorists, the people's democratic state is socialist-type state, but not a socialist state itself. The form of government of people's democratic states is unified state power of the supreme state organ of power, under the leadership of the ruling communist party. Despite this, forms of government have not always been identical in different states, with some slight institutional differences.

Overview of communist states that have self-described as people's democratic
State	Dates active	Duration	Leading party	Supreme state organ of power	Ref.
Afghanistan (Note: The first communist leaders of communist Afghanistan, Nur Muhammad Taraki and Hafizullah Amin, believed they had created a people's democratic state. An internal party faction, the Parcham, believed they had created a national democratic state. The Soviets agreed with the former.)	30 April 1978–27 December 1979	1 year, 241 days	People's Democratic Party	Revolutionary Council	
Albania	11 January 1946–28 December 1976	30 years, 352 days	Party of Labour	People's Assembly	
Angola	10 December 1977–26 August 1992	14 years, 260 days	People's Movement for the Liberation	People's Assembly	
Benin	23 May 1977–1 March 1990	12 years, 282 days	People's Revolutionary Party	National Revolutionary Assembly	
Bulgaria	4 December 1947–18 May 1971	24 years, 245 days	Communist Party	National Assembly	
Cambodia	7 January 1979–15 March 1992	13 years, 68 days	People's Revolutionary Party	National Assembly	
China	1 October 1949–17 November 1975	26 years, 47 days	Communist Party	National People's Congress	
Congo	31 December 1969–15 March 1992	22 years, 75 days	Party of Labour	National People's Assembly	
Cuba	16 February 1959–24 February 1976	17 years, 8 days	Communist Party	National Assembly of People's Power	
Czechoslovakia	25 February 1948–11 July 1960	12 years, 137 days	Communist Party	National Assembly	
East Germany	9 October 1949–8 April 1968	18 years, 182 days	Socialist Unity Party	People's Chamber	
Ethiopia	22 February 1987–28 May 1991	4 years, 95 days	Workers' Party	National Shengo	
Hungary	18 August 1949–26 April 1972	22 years, 250 days	Socialist Workers' Party	National Assembly	
Kampuchea	17 April 1975–7 January 1979	3 years, 2 days	Communist Party	Assembly of People's Representatives	
Laos	2 December 1975–	50 years, 353 days	People's Revolutionary Party	National Assembly	
Mongolia	26 November 1924–6 July 1960	35 years, 223 days	People's Revolutionary Party	People's Great Khural	
Mozambique	25 June 1975–30 November 1990	15 years, 158 days	Liberation Front	People's Assembly	
North Korea	9 September 1948–27 December 1972	24 years, 109 days	Workers' Party	Supreme People's Assembly	
North Vietnam	2 September 1945–2 July 1976	30 years, 304 days	Workers' Party	National Assembly	
Poland	14 December 1948–10 February 1976	27 years, 58 days	United Workers' Party	Sejm	
Romania	30 December 1947–21 August 1965	17 years, 234 days	Communist Party	Great National Assembly	
South Vietnam	30 April 1975 (Note: The Provisional Revolutionary Government of the Republic of South Vietnam was formally established on 8 June 1969, but did not capture state power until the fall of the US-backed Republic of Vietnam on 30 April 1975.)–2 July 1976	1 year, 63 days (Note: If one counts days from the formal establishment of the Provisional Revolutionary Government of the Republic of South Vietnam in June 1969, it existed for 7 years, 24 days.)	People's Revolutionary Party	People's Assembly	
South Yemen	30 November 1970–20 May 1990	19 years, 171 days	Socialist Party	Supreme People's Council	
Tuva (Note: The Tuvan People's Republic did not claim to have reached socialism or to have created a socialist state. The Soviet Union believed its material base, meaning its socio-economic level, was too low to establish socialism, and it was believed it was on the path of non-capitalist development. It was termed a people's republic, but at this time, the Soviets had not created a cohesive theoretical framework to explain what the Tuvan People's Republic was. The first such attempt came later in the form of people's democracy.)	14 August 1921–11 October 1944	23 years, 58 days	People's Revolutionary Party	People's Khural	
Yugoslavia	20 November 1945–7 April 1963	17 years, 138 days	League of Communists	Federal People's Assembly	

=== National democratic states ===
A national democratic state is a state formation that, according to Marxist–Leninist national democratic theory, is the product of a national democratic revolution. In certain cases, it was believed, a national democratic state could endeavour to establish the socialist mode of production, transforming the state into a communist state formation known as a socialist state in the process.

Overview of communist states that have self-described as national democratic
State	Established	Dissolved	Duration	Leading party	Ref.
Afghanistan (Note: The Soviet intervention in Afghanistan produced a new Afghan state leadership headed by Babrak Karmal. This leadership believed the Saur Revolution had produced a national democratic state: the Soviets concurred.)	27 December 1979	28 April 1992	12 years, 123 days	People's Democratic Party	
Angola	11 November 1975	10 December 1977	2 years, 29 days	People's Movement for the Liberation	
Congo	16 August 1963	31 December 1969	6 years, 137 days	National Movement of the Revolution	
Ethiopia	12 September 1974	22 February 1987	12 years, 163 days	Workers' Party	
Grenada	13 March 1979	29 October 1983	4 years, 230 days	New Jewel Movement	

=== Communist predecessor states to the USSR ===
Overview of communist predecessor states to the USSR
State	Established	Dissolved	Duration	Ref.
Armenia	29 November 1920	30 December 1922	2 years, 31 days	
Azerbaijan	2 September 1920	27 October 1922	1 year, 318 days	
Bukhara	8 October 1920	27 October 1924	4 years, 19 days	
Byelorussia, 1st attempt	1 January 1919	27 February 1919	57 days	
Byelorussia, 2nd attempt	31 July 1920	31 December 1922	2 years, 153 days	
Crimea	12 May 1919	26 June 1919	45 days	
Donetsk–Krivoy Rog	12 February 1918	20 March 1918	36 days	
Estonia	29 November 1918	5 June 1919	188 days	
Far Eastern Republic	6 April 1920	15 November 1922	2 years, 223 days	
Galicia	8 July 1920	21 September 1920	75 days	
Georgia	25 February 1921	30 December 1922	1 year, 308 days	
Khorezm	26 April 1920	24 October 1924	4 years, 181 days	
Latvia	17 December 1918	13 January 1920	1 year, 27 days	
Lithuania	16 December 1918	27 February 1919	73 days	
Lithuania and Belorussia	27 February 1919	31 July 1920	1 year, 155 days	
Mughan	15 May 1919	25 June 1919	41 days	
Odessa	1 March 1918	13 March 1918	12 days	
Russia	7 November 1917	30 December 1922	5 years, 53 days	
Ukraine, 1st attempt	25 December 1917	18 April 1918	114 days	
Ukraine, 2nd attempt	10 March 1919	30 December 1922	3 years, 295 days	

=== Ephemeral states ===
Overview of ephemeral communist states
State	Established	Dissolved	Duration	Ref.
Azerbaijan	20 November 1945	12 December 1946	1 year, 22 days	
Bavaria	7 April 1919	2 May 1919	25 days	
Botoșani	7 April 1944	23 August 1944	138 days	
Bremen	10 January 1919	4 February 1919	21 days	
Chile	4 June 1932	13 September 1932	101 days	
China	7 November 1931	22 September 1937	5 years, 319 days	
Fatsa	14 October 1979	11 June 1980	241 days	
Finland, 1st attempt	29 January 1918	5 May 1918	96 days	
Finland, 2nd attempt	1 December 1939	12 March 1940	102 days	
Guinea-Bissau	23 January 1963	10 September 1974	13 years, 230 days	
Hungary	21 March 1919	3 August 1919	135 days	
Mahabad	22 January 1946	15 December 1946	327 days	
Persia	20 May 1920	20 September 1920	123 days	
Slovakia	16 June 1919	7 July 1919	21 days	
East Turkestan	7 November 1944	1 July 1946 (Note: East Turkestan was reformed to the Ili District Council and became a part of the Coalition Government of Xinjiang Province.)	1 year, 236 days	

== See also ==
- Liberal democratic constitutions with references to socialism
- List of non-communist socialist states
