= National democratic state =

Concept in Marxist–Leninist theory

A national democratic state is a state as political entity that, according to the Marxist–Leninist theory of national democracy, is the product of a national democratic revolution. In certain cases, it was believed, a national democratic state could endeavour to establish the socialist mode of production, transforming the state into a communist state known as a socialist state in the process.

== Basic definition ==
"[The national democratic state] consistently upholds its political and economic independence, fights against imperialism and its military blocs, against military bases on its territory; fights against the new forms of colonialism and the penetration of imperialist capital; rejects dictatorial and despotic methods of government; ensures the people’s broad democratic rights and freedoms (freedom of the press, speech, assembly, demonstration, establishment of political parties and social organisations) and the opportunity of working for the enactment of agrarian reform and other domestic and social changes, and for participation of the people in shaping government policy."

— Declaration of the 1960 International Meeting of Communist and Workers Parties.

The 1960 International Meeting of Communist and Workers Parties, held in Moscow, defined the national democratic state as follows: "[The] political form of the activity of the revolutionary democracy is the national democratic state". What constituted a revolutionary democracy and a national democratic state was, according to scholar Irina Flatova, "so vague that they could be stretched in any direction. Clearly, there were no tangible criteria for a government to be recognised as a revolutionary democracy, and for a country to be considered a national democratic state. But the slogans were attractive, and this was what mattered." Despite this vagueness, Soviet analysts agreed that the national democratic state was "a transitional state towards a state of the socialist type".

The national democratic state was later divided into two types: one for non-communist national democratic states and another for communist national democratic states, which later became known as states of socialist orientation. However, in some circles, the terminology differed. For example, some spoke of a "national democratic state of socialist orientation" to indicate a state without a national democratic front and a revolutionary democratic vanguard party, and others spoke of a people's democratic state of socialist orientation, a state run by a revolutionary democratic vanguard party that was close to the communist bloc. A people's democratic state of socialist orientation was also expected to institute a communist form of government based on democratic centralism and unified power, and establish a supreme state organ of power.

== The state's characteristics ==
Soviet theorists never reached a consensus as to the national democratic state's material base, meaning the economic foundation of the state. The Soviet academic journal Africa: Problems of Socialist Orientation argued that the proletariat, peasantry, and national bourgeoisie formed a coalition that served as the ruling class, that is, acted as the material base of the national democratic state. Rostislav Ulyanovsky concurred with this definition. He believed the national democratic state to be the political power of a social coalition composed of the working people. This coalition comprised the ever-growing proletariat, the petty bourgeoisie in urban and rural areas, and certain national bourgeois individuals who adopted a progressive and anti-imperialist stance.

During the Moscow summit of 1960, a national democratic state was defined as a state type where a forward-looking bourgeois nationalist ruling class governed in partnership with communist forces. The summit declaration stated that a national democratic state had four key characteristics. Firstly, it was politically and economically autonomous from capitalist countries and worked to negate the latters' influence in its internal affairs. Secondly, it aimed to reduce Western capitalist influence on their economy through proactive state policies. Thirdly, these states permitted local communists to organise and operate freely. Finally, these states actively worked to enhance the state's involvement in economic affairs.

Even with these four characteristics, Soviet theorists were unable to come to an agreement on how the national democratic state would reach socialism, specifically the socialist mode of production and the establishment of a socialist state. The dominant idea that emerged at the end of Khrushchev's leadership was that communists should be allowed freedom to operate within the framework of the national democratic state and seize power when the base and superstructural relations were ripe. Consequently, the national democratic state was considered temporary and, according to Soviet theorists, would eventually be succeeded by a socialist state in the future. The idea was that the national democratic states, through their close cooperation with the Soviet Union, would draw on the Soviet model and gradually introduce communism through reform. That is, it would be a non-violent method of transitioning to communism.

According to Africa: Problems of Socialist Orientation, the national democratic state needed to enforce "A speedy, revolutionary creation of the material, technical, scientific, social and political prerequisites for socialist construction constitutes the essence of non-capitalist development." On the other hand, the Soviet African Encyclopaedia stated the following, "[The national democratic state must] take the course toward the elimination of the economic and political domination of imperialist monopolies and trans-national corporations, as well as of internal reaction—feudal landlords, tribal nobility and the pro-imperialist bourgeoisie; strengthen the state sector—the economic basis of socialist orientation; encourage co-operative movements in the rural areas; implement progressive agricultural reforms, aimed at the elimination of feudal property and at the creation of a rural public sector." Specifically, African Encyclopaedia editors believed that the state sector represented the main tool in the construction of socialism and a defense against the domination of foreign capital.

Pyotr Manchkha, in his book Current Problems in Modern Africa, contended that the national democratic state would initiate policies that saw "systematic improvement of the standards of life of working people" and "the creation of a reliable mechanism of defence of revolutionary achievements from external and internal enemies". Gleb Starushenko, writing in his book Africa: Problems of Socialist Orientation, added two other features: "an independent foreign policy" and "economic, political and cultural cooperation with socialist countries". Regarding national democratic states that were under communist rule (states of socialist orientation), all analysts, according to Flatova, stressed the importance of the "leading role of the proletariat" and cooperation with the communist world. Filatova argues that, in practice, none of these purported features or reforms meant anything: "It seems that what mattered for these countries to be recognised as non-capitalist by the Soviet bloc was their willingness to proclaim socialism as their goal, to introduce some form of state control over their economy and to support the Soviet Union in the international arena."

By the late 1970s, Soviet analysts began voicing skepticism regarding the notion that a national democratic state was a tool to transition to socialism. Karen Brutents sent a memorandum to Boris Ponomarev, the head of the CPSU International Department, that national democrats were not moving in a socialist direction. He reasoned that this was due to the petty bourgeoisie nature of the national democrats. Skepticism regarding the concepts of national democracy and the national democratic state was not new in communist circles, especially amongst communists in the Third World. Joe Slovo, who later became the general secretary of the Central Committee of the South African Communist Party, wrote in 1974, "Lenin's theoretical commitment to a bourgeois democratic phase in pre-February Russia was bound up with the slogan of a ‘revolutionary democratic dictatorship of workers and peasants’ and not that of bourgeoisie". That is, Slovo believed in the national democratic revolution, but only if it was led by the proletariat and the working masses and not by the bourgeoisie.

== The state's historical development ==
1. elimination of the position of imperialist monopolies, local big bourgeoisie, and feudal lords;
2. state control of the commanding heights of the economy;
3. planned development of the productive forces;
4. encouragement of the cooperative movement in the countryside;
5. growth of the working people and peasants’ role in managing society.

— Soviet theorist Georgy Kim outlining the tasks of the national-revolutionary democratic struggle in an article in Pravda, the newspaper of the CPSU Central Committee, on 20 June 1981.

There was disagreement within the Soviet scholarly community on how the national democratic state would develop. Some believed it to be a uniform entity that would develop socialism, while others proposed that one or more interim stages had to be reached before such an entity became a socialist state. While there was a consensus that the national democratic state was a transitory state, there was no consensus on how this transition would unfold or how the national democratic state would establish socialism.

Soviet orientalist Yuri Gavrilov believed that the national democratic state had to undergo three interim stages before developing into a socialist state. In the first stage, it would be headed by petty and national bourgeois elements who enforced anti-capitalist policies, mostly due to their nationalist ideology. The second stage, called revolutionary democracy, replaced this narrow-minded nationalism with a socialism based on clear material interests. The third stage was called national democracy. It was the penultimate stage in the establishment of the socialist mode of production and the socialist state. In this stage, the ideological belief of the ruling class was believed to be, at the very least, influenced by scientific socialism. Theorist Aleksei Kiva believed the national democratic state was arrived at in two ways: national democracy and revolutionary democracy. Each stage represented a specific stage of development of the material base, which produced specific class interests and groups. National democracy was the stage for societies that had a pre-capitalist material basis, too underdeveloped to establish socialism, while revolutionary democracy suited societies at a medium level of development. The national democratic state during national democracy was perceived as a national democratic front of progressive and anti-imperialist elements, while the state under revolutionary democracy was perceived to be led by a form of scientific socialism.

Unlike Gavrilov, Georgy Kim, the editor of the Soviet academic journal Asia and Africa, believed revolutionary democracy to be unique to the national democratic state, but not as a specific stage. According to Kim, revolutionary democracy was an ideology or type of rule of the national democratic state that paved the way for socialism. Like Kim, Soviet theorists Petr Manchkha and Lev Entin considered revolutionary democracy as the type of rule (meaning ideological system and leader) unique to the national democratic state. However, unlike Kim, they specified that the national democratic state was a "broad democracy". Unlike Kim, Gavrilov, and Kiva, Ulyanovsky merged the two terms, national democracy and revolutionary democracy, into one: national-revolutionary democracy, which he perceived as a stage between "national reformism" and scientific socialism. However, Ulyanovsky was not consistent in his works, and in certain writings he referred to revolutionary democracy as the leftist faction of a national democratic society. He believed that without a revolutionary democratic element, the national democratic state would decay into a reactionary state. The national democratic state, he argued, was neither a progressive nor a reactionary state formation in itself, but rather a state built on an inherently contradictory class basis. Brutents mostly agreed with Ulyanovsky's assessment, but he considered the national democratic state to be a unique state formation in the sense that it had the ingrained possibility, due to its class character, to establish socialism and capitalism.

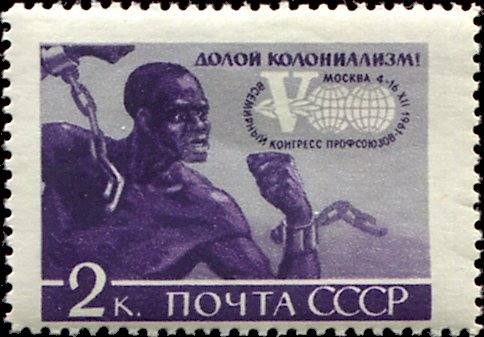
Soviet theorists believed that the national liberation struggle and the national democratic revolution would liberate oppressed colonials from oppression. In the picture, a Soviet stamp depicts an African breaking the chains of oppression.

According to Golan, "On the whole, revolutionary democracy was understood as a particular form of national democracy associated with a particular ideology and group which subscribed to it." While there was a general idea that the revolutionary democratic elite of a national democratic state had to reject capitalism ideologically and espouse socialism, it was not altogether clear if the revolutionary democrats should abolish capitalism immediately. Soviet foreign specialist Yevgeny Primakov recommended not discarding capitalism, even going so far as to recommend establishing state capitalism or developing capitalism since, from a materialistic standpoint, capitalism, while inferior to socialism, was more progressive than feudalism and traditional society. Brutents concurred, arguing that capitalism in these states did not contradict their anti-imperialist character. Kim outlined that the national democratic state under revolutionary democracy should, firstly, eliminate or drastically reduce the amount of foreign capital; secondly, establish national democratic institutions, a vanguard national-patriotic party and transmission belts that representing the working class; and, lastly, align the state's foreign policy with that of the communist world.

Several theorists, best represented by Pyotr Fedoseyev, were critical of revolutionary democracy as a concept. Fedoseyev highlighted the bourgeoisie class background of most revolutionary democrats, reasoning that they were mostly not inclined towards socialism. However, he considered revolutionary democracy a long process subject to progress and reversals that might lead to scientific socialism. His main point was that there was no guarantee that the national democratic state under revolutionary democracy would create a socialist society since the revolutionary democrats were under the influence of Third Way ideas, a system that was neither capitalist nor communist. Georgy Mirsky concurred, labelling revolutionary democrats as "leftist radical nationalists [...] which may or may not take the road of socialism." Like Fedoseyev, Mirsky reasoned that the revolutionary democrats could "get stuck" in a Third Way policy instead of affirming scientific socialism.

Lev Entin shared Fedoseyev's and Mirsky's reasoning, highlighting the bourgeoisie class background of revolutionary democrats and how most of them rejected the class conception of the state and the need for a dictatorship of the proletariat. Yuri Gavrilov believed that revolutionary democrats used Marxist rhetoric, but did not actually believe in it. Ulyanovsky made clear the progressive nature of revolutionary democracy, but had a qualification: "Revolutionary democracy can be a staunch ally of the proletariat if it does not slide back to the positions of the national bourgeoisie but breaks away from them." Brutents, unlike Ulyanovsky, agreed with Fedoseyev, concluding that revolutionary democracy did not guarantee the development of socialism. He reasoned that this was due to both objective factors (material circumstances) such as the low level of development and the class composition of the national democratic state, and subjective factors (superstructural circumstances) such as the ideological outlook of the revolutionary democrats.

This paradigm came under attack from Nodari Simoniya, a Soviet orientalist theorist from Georgia, in his 1975 book, Countries of the East: Roads of Development. In the book, Simoniya denied the national liberation struggle and the national democratic revolution a special character, simply referring to it as a bourgeois revolution. That meant he did not believe these revolutions had anything innate in them to produce socialism. While thoroughly criticised in the press and within the party establishment, this debate produced a new understanding of the national democratic state and revolutionary democracy. In 1978, Semen Agaev and Inna Tatarovskaia wrote an article in the Soviet academic journal Asia and Africa that supported most of Simoniya's criticism, except the socialist potential of the non-capitalist path offered by the national democratic revolution and state. In their article, they tried to bridge the gap between those who considered national democracy as a bourgeoisie phenomenon and those who thought the national democratic state was a tool to establish socialism. Their key argument was to differentiate the national liberation struggle (national liberation revolution) from the national democratic revolution. They formulated three stages: the first stage was the national liberation struggle, the second stage was the national democratic revolution, and the last stage was the socialist revolution. The national democratic state came into being after a national democratic revolution, but that state formation would have to be taken over by a revolutionary democratic elite to initiate the construction of socialism.

== Vanguard party ==
At a 1980 Conference on the Third World, Boris Ponomarev, the head of the International Department of the CPSU Central Committee, listed establishing a "revolutionary vanguard party founded on scientific socialism" as the first requirement to create a viable national democratic state in its revolutionary democratic stage. While Soviet literature on national democracy in the 1970s and 1980s made direct references to vanguardism, there was, according to Golan, skepticism within the Soviet foreign policy establishment regarding the viability of creating Marxist–Leninist parties in the Third World. While it was acknowledged that a Marxist–Leninist vanguard party needed to be established for a national democratic state to transform into a socialist state, most commentators asked for gradualism and instead called for a revolutionary democratic vanguard party.

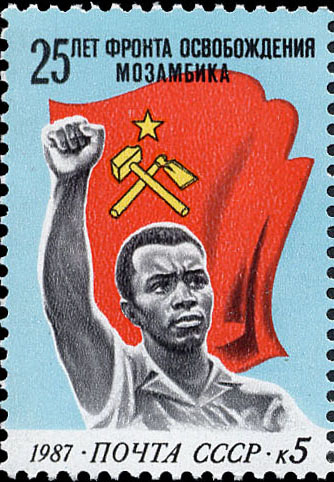
A Soviet stamp commemorating the founding of FRELIMO, the communist state ruling party of the People's Republic of Mozambique. Despite its avowed communist stance, FRELIMO was not considered a Marxist–Leninist party by the Soviet establishment.

Primakov believed that a vanguard party was not needed at every stage of a national democratic state's development. In the first stage of the national democratic revolution, the state could be led by "national revolutionary elements". In its revolutionary democratic phase, he called for establishing "vanguard revolutionary parties" that most commonly had a Marxist–Leninist ideology that worked to construct a people's democracy. However, he warned against leftist adventurism and called for establishing a Marxist–Leninist party at the right time, when the material conditions were ripe for it. Nikolai Kosukhin, a department head at the Africa Institute of the USSR Academy of Social Sciences, concurred with Primakov, but altered his schema. During the national liberation struggle, Kosukhin called for a mass party open to everyone. At the next stage, that party had to be transformed into a revolutionary democratic party based on social class and specific organisational principles. At the third stage, that party had to be transformed into a Marxist–Leninist party. Most of the Soviet policy establishment expressed the same skepticism of a Marxist−Leninist vanguard party in national democratic states. Gleb Starushenko believed that few societies were prepared to develop socialism and should instead focus on strengthening and developing the national democratic state.

Entin, when writing on the vanguard party in the national democratic revolution, made no references to Marxism–Leninism and the proletarian character of the party in his writings. Orientalist Aleksey Kiva specified that "the crux of the matter lies not so much in the parties as in the nature of the revolutionary process itself." Kiva distinguished between a vanguard revolutionary democratic party and a vanguard proletarian party. The latter, while having emerged in an infant state in some African states, had not even in these instances evolved into a true Marxist–Leninist proletarian party. Kiva argued that the key difference between them and a "real" Marxist–Leninist party was that in Africa, these parties had an unclear understanding of Marxism–Leninism and did not have a truly proletarian class composition. In his view, the transformation into a real Marxist–Leninist party took time and was determined by material conditions and developments.

The Soviet policy establishment's innate skepticism regarding establishing Marxist–Leninist vanguard parties in the Third World led it to advise against establishing them or transforming national democratic parties into them. For example, Simoniya and fellow orientalist Pyotr Shastitko quoted Vladimir Lenin's advice to the Mongolian People's Revolutionary Party that they not establish a communist party in 1921. While both believed that only a Marxist–Leninist vanguard party could establish socialism, they urged instead for forming broad national democratic fronts and class blocs to transform society toward socialism. Anatoly Gromyko went the furthest, refusing to recognise any vanguard party in Africa as Marxist–Leninist. By 1981, Gromyko spoke of "the aspiration" of these parties to become Marxist–Leninist, but made it clear that he did not consider them to be that. The general idea was that the material base in these societies, especially in Africa, was too low. Establishing a Marxist–Leninist party in haste could do more harm than good. Brutents was of the same position. While saying a vanguard party was key to transforming a national democratic state into a socialist one, he also advised against haste. He noted that in states without a vanguard party, such as Gamal Abdel Nasser's Egypt, the socialist cause was in retreat.

Ulyanovsky infrequently addressed the concept of the vanguard party in his writings. However, he did highlight what he perceived as the importance of establishing a progressive party within the framework of a national democratic state. Instead, he wanted Soviet policy to primarily focus on building wide-ranging national democratic fronts in these states. In focusing on the national democratic front, he believed the communist parties in Asian and African nations had recognised the importance of not pursuing immediate power. If they did, he thought it would devolve into putschism. Ulyanovsky believed that no ruling party in Africa, including those that called themselves communists, could truly be considered Marxist–Leninist. As a logical extension, he believed that none of the ruling vanguard parties in Africa, even those of the self-proclaimed communist states, could be considered Marxist–Leninist parties.

To Ulyanovsky, creating a vanguard party based on Marxism–Leninism in a post-colonial society that was socioeconomically and economically backward was a complex societal process. His point was that Marxist–Leninist parties could not be reduced to approving and proclaiming a self-declared scientific socialist programme. To bring about scientific socialism, the Marxist–Leninist party leadership had to make theory the basis for all practical activities at all party levels. Ulyanovsky believed that the only way for a national democratic party to evolve into a Marxist–Leninist party was through this process. This transformation would enable the party to understand the social, ideological, political, and organisational structures needed to guide the majority of the population toward socialism.

Nikolai Kosukhin was skeptical about the possibility of forming a Marxist–Leninist party in national democratic states in the near future. He contended that the establishment of ruling parties based on scientific socialist ideologies within the national democratic states of socialist orientation was a complex and highly contradictory endeavor. The main reason was that the ruling party often reflected society’s level of the material foundation and superstructure. In national democratic states, the working class did not hold power as the ruling class. He observed that the spread of Marxist–Leninist ideology encountered significant opposition from conventional communal and nationalist perspectives. From his viewpoint, dismantling outdated biases was a meticulous and sensitive task that would require a significant amount of time to overcome. Kosukhin argued that artificially accelerating the process of establishing Marxist–Leninist parties would cause more harm than good.

In his speech to the 26th CPSU Congress, held in 1981, Leonid Brezhnev, the general secretary of the CPSU Central Committee, glossed over the issue entirely, only mentioning the fact that some states had chosen to develop along a non-capitalist path while others had not. Vadim Zagladin, a member of the Central Committee and an official within the CPSU International Department, after the congress acknowledged that a group of countries were "continuing the formation of vanguard revolutionary parties recognising Marxism–Leninism and proletarian internationalism as their basis." But he did not acknowledge them as Marxist–Leninist. Before succeeding Brezhnev as general secretary, Yuri Andropov often spoke of the need to establish Marxist–Leninist parties in the national democratic states. However, once he came to power, he toed the party line, stating, "It is one thing to proclaim socialism as a goal and another to build it."

== Classification ==
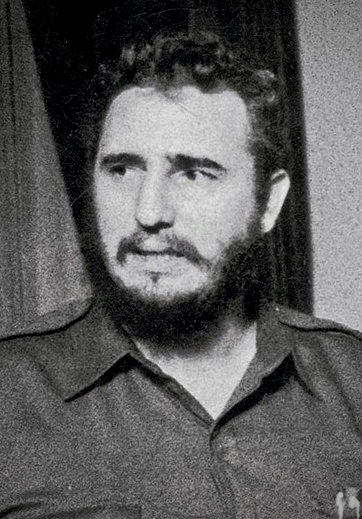
Fidel Castro, the leader of the Cuban communist state from 1959 to 2011, did not accept the label "national democracy" to describe the material base and superstructural relations that existed in Cuba.

Cuba was the first state designated as a national democratic state. At the 1960 International Meeting of Communist and Workers Parties, East German leaders Walter Ulbricht and Hermann Matern said that Cuba had established a national democratic state. However, the Cuban leadership of Fidel Castro never accepted this designation. Instead, they claimed that Cuba was in the process of building socialism. By 1962 the May Day celebrations, the Soviet Union had begun designating Cuba as a country that had "embarked on the path of building socialism". From then on, all mentions of Cuba as a national democratic state were removed from Soviet works on the matter; and the term was used to mostly used to denote states that adhered to an alternate conception of socialism to that offered by Marxism–Leninism, such as Ahmed Sékou Touré's Guinea, Kwame Nkrumah's Ghana, and Modibo Keïta's Mali. According to scholar William T. Shinn Jr., the application of national democracy met with several problems, such as the fact that there did not exist any communist parties in these states. Despite this, or maybe because of it, Anastas Mikoyan, then a Soviet First Deputy Premier, declared in 1962 that these states represented "new forms of national democracy". He also acknowledged that Ghana was "building socialism", but a different form of socialism from the Soviet model.

By the 1970s, there was a dispute within the Soviet foreign policy community on how to assess the communist states of the Third World. Georgy Kim categorised, for example, the Provisional Military Administrative Council of Ethiopia and the People's Republic of Angola as national democratic states in a revolutionary democratic stage of development. In contrast, Gleb Starushenko and Yuri Gavrilov designated these same states as people's democracies. Moreover, Kim, Starushenko, and Georgy Mirsky referred to Angola's MPLA and Mozambique's FRELIMO as Marxist—Leninist parties, while Anatoly Gromyko, the head of the Institute of African Studies of the USSR Academy of Social Sciences, "explicitly denied them this status". Nodari Simoniya believed the communist states of Angola, Ethiopia, People's Republic of Mozambique, and People's Democratic Republic of Yemen were national democratic states in a revolutionary democratic phase that were developing into people's democracies, meaning that the Soviet Union did not consider any of the African communist states to be either socialist or people's democracies. Rather, the Soviet Union defined them as national democratic states of socialist orientation (or simply as states of socialist orientation).
