= Georgy Kim =

Georgy Kim (Russian: Георгий Ким) may refer to:

- Georgy Kim (orientalist) (1924–1989), Soviet orientalist
- Georgy Kim (statesman) (born 1953), Kazakhstani politician
