= Socialist state (communism) =

Marxist concept

In applied communist practice, a socialist state is a communist state formation that is the product of a purported base and superstructural relation that is called the socialist mode of production, or simply socialism. Socialism acts as the base of the socialist state, while the superstructure is made up of two parts: the class character of the state and the organisational form of state power.

- The class character of the state involves the dictatorship of the proletariat (or a variant thereof) in which the proletariat acts as the ruling class; purportedly the most advanced elements of this class form a vanguard party (communist party) to lead the state. The theoretical exception to this rule was the Soviet Union: from 1961 onwards the Communist Party of the Soviet Union (CPSU) argued that it had created a developed socialist society where the proletarian dictatorship had been replaced by a socialist state of the whole people since all the exploitative classes had been defeated. The Chinese Communist Party vehemently opposed this theory and argued that every state formation had to have a ruling class.
- The organisational form of state power, literally the form of government in Marxist–Leninist vocabulary, is centered on the unified power of the supreme state organ of power that operates under the guidance of the vanguard party.

The majority of communist states have been unable to establish a socialist state. These states had, according to Marxist–Leninist doctrine, reached a lower form of development and designated themselves, or were designated, for example, as national democratic states, states of socialist orientation or as people's democratic states.

== Concept ==
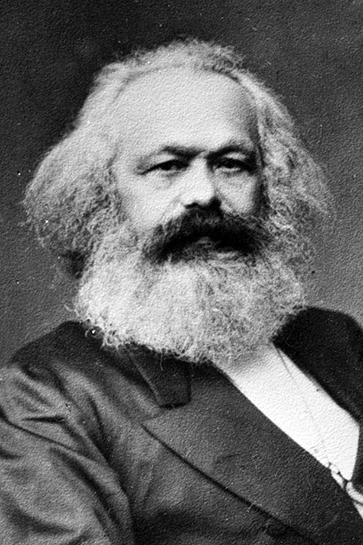
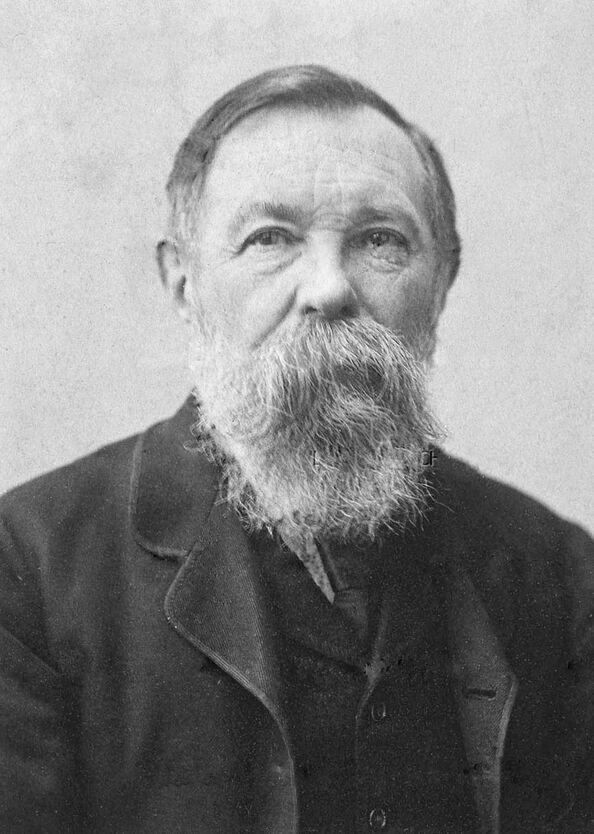
Marx (left) and Engels (right) formulated the Marxist theory of the state, and their theoretical works influenced Lenin and Stalin.

The Marxist theory of the state deems it to be an oppressive tool of the ruling class. In The Communist Manifesto, Karl Marx and Friedrich Engels contend that the state is "but a committee for managing the common affairs of the whole bourgeoisie." Later, in his book Anti-Duhring, Engels argued that the aim of the proletariat was to abolish the state: "it puts an end also to the state ... the state ... withers away." The Russian Bolshevik leader Vladimir Lenin supported Engels' notion of the withering away of the state in his book, The State and Revolution. Lenin defines the state as "a product and a manifestation of the irreconcilability of class antagonisms", that is, the state is a product of the class struggle within a given society. He further notes that the state is "a power which arose from society but places itself above and alienates itself more and more from it", and that in the hands of the dictatorship of the bourgeoisie (literally a state in which the bourgeoisie acts as the ruling class) the state is an "organ of class rule, an organ for the oppression of one class by another". The oppressed classes, headed by the proletariat, Lenin argued, needed not only to overcome bourgeoisie class rule but to abolish the state power created by them. The old state, Lenin contends, "must be replaced by a 'special coercive force' for the suppression of the bourgeoisie by the proletariat (the dictatorship of the proletariat)". Only when there was no more class enemies to oppress would the state wither away, Lenin argued.

Lenin further clarified his thoughts on the state in his Letters on Tactics. In it, he argued that a state would exist in the transitory period between the capitalist mode of production and communist mode of production: the transitory phase was later referred to as the socialist mode of production (socialism for short). This state, under the dictatorship of the proletariat (literally a state in which the proletariat acts as the ruling class), would differ from the dictatorship of the bourgeoisie in the sense that it would be "without a standing army, without a police opposed to the people, without an officialdom placed above the people." That is, Lenin argued that the state would only start withering away when the state in question had completed the socialisation of the means of production (the economy). After the Bolsheviks seized power in the October Revolution, Lenin began referring to a proletarian state. He contended in his article, "The Immediate Tasks of Soviet Power" (published in 1918), that the new state was the "organisational form of the dictatorship of the proletariat." He argued that this dictatorship was to be headed by the most advanced elements from the proletariat through the communist party, which was tasked with raising the consciousness of society to actively partake in state administration. This organisational form, Lenin argued, "can emancipate humanity from the oppression of capital, from the lies, falsehood and hypocrisy of bourgeois democracy—democracy for the rich—and establish democracy for the poor, that is, make the blessings of democracy really accessible to the workers and poor peasants."

In the same article, Lenin contended that Soviet Russia was not a socialist state, "The socialist state can arise only as a network of producers’ and consumers’ communes, which conscientiously keep account of their production and consumption, economise on labour, and steadily raise the productivity of labour, thus making it possible to reduce the working day to seven, six and even fewer hours." He later clarified that "socialism is nothing but the next step forward from state-capitalist monopoly. Or, in the words, socialism is nothing but state-capitalist monopoly which is made to serve the interests of the whole people and has to that extent ceased to be capitalist monopoly." Soviet Russia could not construct socialism without the advanced technology of the capitalist countries, and in his pamphlet, A Tax in Kind, Lenin argued in favour of implementing state capitalism to construct socialism, arguing this retreat was both necessary given the backward nature of Russia's economy and that the proletarian state could limit the worst tendencies of capitalism. Lenin believed that socialism was not attainable in the short-run and made it synonymous with a classless society, stating, "as long as workers and peasants remain, socialism has not been achieved." He further noted that socialism was, by definition, an economic system organised from below, "We recognise only one road-changes from below; we wanted the workers themselves, from below, to draw up the new, basic economic principles." The proletarian state formation headed by the Bolsheviks, Lenin contended, was not a socialist, "there remains for a time not only bourgeois law, but even the bourgeois state, without the bourgeoisie." Later, in 1921, Lenin in The Party in Crisis argued against the notion that Soviet Russia was a proletarian state, "A [proletarian] state is an abstraction. What we actually have is a [proletarian] state with this peculiarity: firstly, that it is not the working class but the peasant population that predominates in the country, and, secondly, that it is a [proletarian] state with bureaucratic distortions."

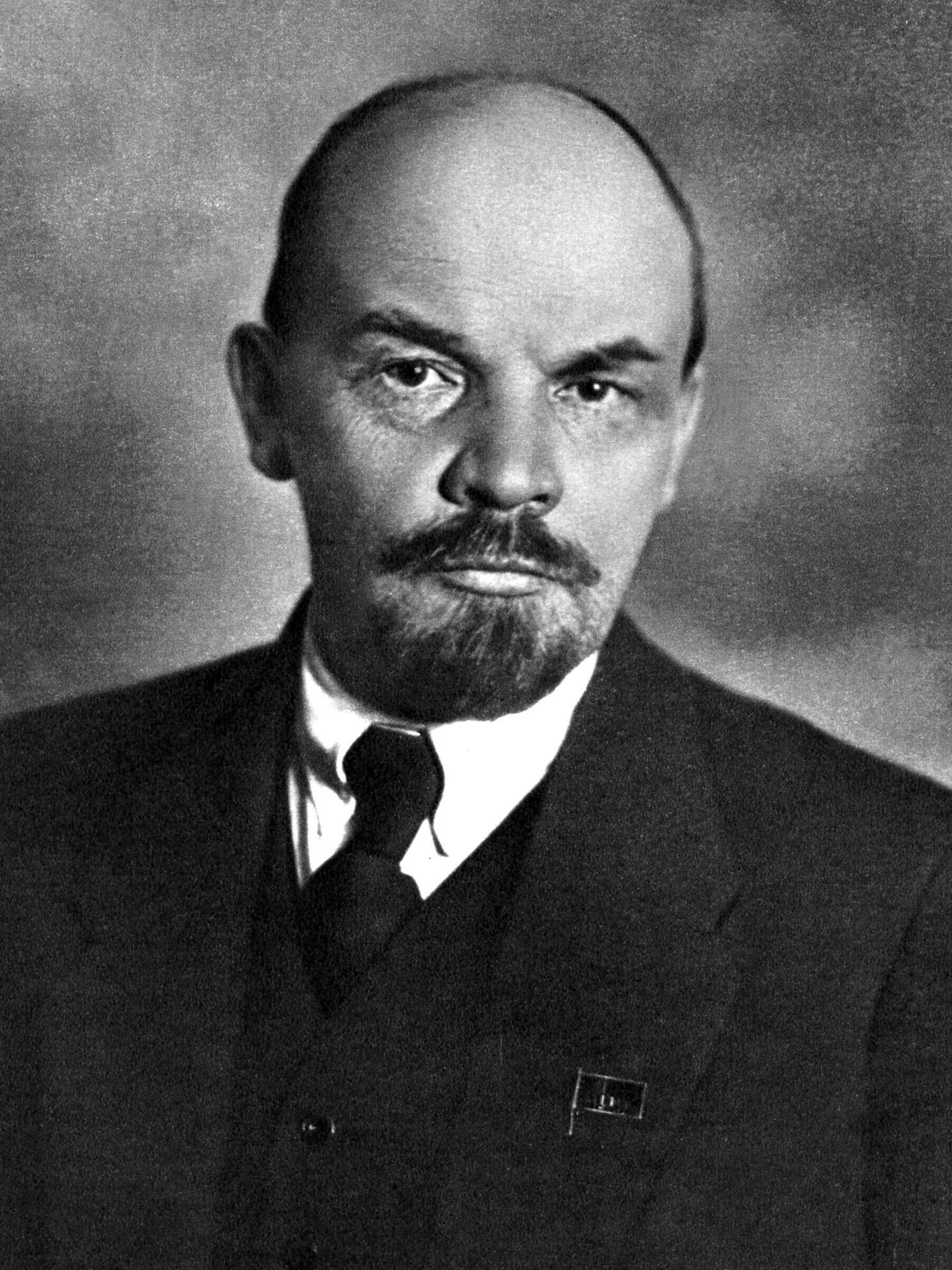
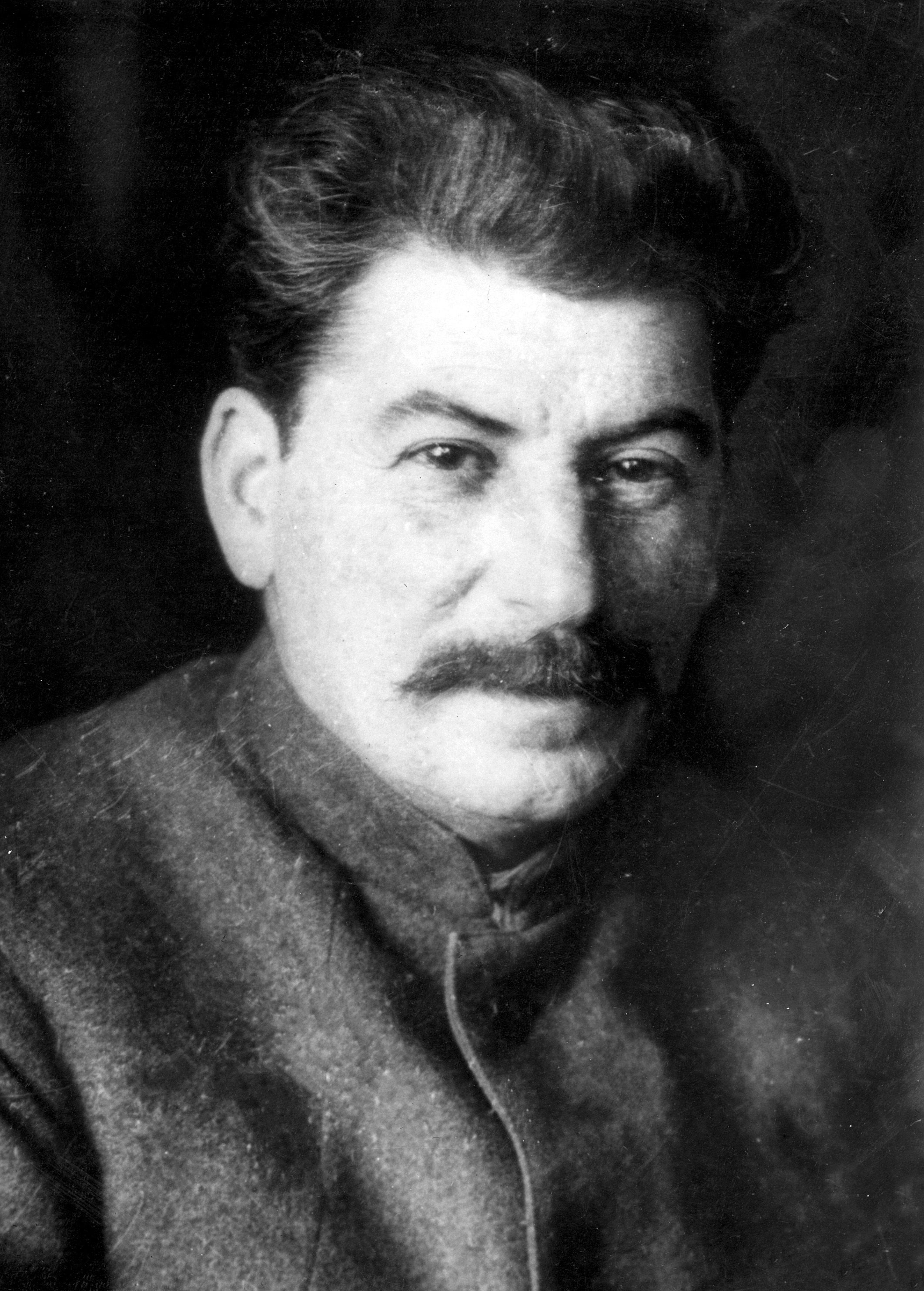
Lenin (left) and Stalin (right) disagreed on whether a socialist state was a feasible project in itself.

According to scholar Roland Boer, "Although [Joseph] Stalin is usually ignored in analyses of the [socialist] state, he is the one who produced the first seeds for a theory of the socialist state. In order to do so, he had to overcome a number of hurdles bequeathed to him by Lenin, let alone Engels." Originally, he shared Lenin's conviction that the class character of the state was its most important feature, and he referred to the Soviet Union as a "new proletarian type of state". Stalin's earliest writings on the subject is rather vague, and he states that a socialist state is responsible for systematically improving workers wages, reducing price increases and provide the essential for good living. However, by the end of the 1920s, Stalin argued that the economic foundation was a basic feature of any socialist state. At the 2nd Joint Plenary Session of the Central Committee and the Control Commission of the All-Union Communist Party (Bolsheviks) on 7–12 January 1933, Stalin claimed that a socialist economic system had been constructed in the Soviet Union. However, instead of arguing in favour of the withering away of the state, Stalin champions the theory of the aggravation of the class struggle under socialism, in which the proletariat has to struggle against the moribund classes that are trying to sabotage socialism. The aggravation of the class struggle, Stalin reason, would strengthen the state:

"The abolition of classes is not achieved by the extinction of the class struggle, but by its intensification. The state will wither away, not as a result of weakening the state power, but as a result of strengthening it to the utmost, which is necessary for finally crushing the remnants of the dying classes and for organising defence against the capitalist encirclement that is far from having been done away with as yet, and will not soon be done away with."

The socialist state Stalin envisioned had, unlike Lenin's outline, a standing army, a police and officialdom. Its main goal was, in Stalin's words, to "smash" the bourgeoisie state and spread communism. He also envisioned that the growing strength of the Soviet socialist state would intensify "the resistance of the last remnants of the dying classes", both internally and externally. A strong socialist state went hand-in-hand with turning the socialist mode of production into a distinct historical stage of development instead of a transitory stage. The communist stage was postponed even further, with Stalin quoting Lenin by saying that communism was a "very, very" distant goal. When asked directly on the possibility of realising communism, Stalin stated, "Clearly, we are still a long way from such a society." To construct a communist society, Stalin argued, "communism—in economics, politics and culture—must become second nature to human beings and the planet."

Unlike Lenin, Stalin came to believe that the proletarian state was not a remnant of the bourgeoisie state but instead a new type of state. On 25 November 1936, Stalin told an audience that "the complete victory of the Socialist system in all spheres of the national economy is now a fact." The 1936 Soviet Constitution proclaimed the Soviet Union to be a "socialist state of workers and peasants". In contrast to Lenin's vision, Stalin did not believe that the socialisation of the means of production initiated a process of state withering. At the 18th Congress of the All-Union Communist Party (Bolsheviks) in 1939, Stalin asked the assembled delegates a rhetorical question: "Why do we not help our Socialist state to die away?" He answered that as long as the Soviet Union was under capitalist encirclement, the state had to be strengthened to safeguard the socialist system. Later, in 1950, Stalin contended that the state would only wither away when capitalism had been defeated in the majority of countries.

Stalin came to believe that a socialist state had, according to Roland Boer, six defining features. Two conditions must be met for the establishment of a socialist state: the eradication of any remaining capitalist elements and the establishment of a socialist economy. Thirdly, a cultural revolution should have been carried out to educate the masses and raise their class consciousness, similar to the one that occurred in the Soviet Union in the 1920s. Fourthly, after crushing the internal class enemies of socialism, the socialist state must redirect its military, punitive organs, and intelligence services to target external class enemies. Fifthly, a strong socialist state was therefore needed to defend and develop socialism in the context of capitalist encirclement. At last, the need to have a communist party which led the state and represented the most advanced elements of the working class.

== Existing socialist states ==
Overview of current socialist states
| State | Establishment | Leading Party | Supreme state organ of power |
|---|---|---|---|
| North Korea | 27 December 1972 | Workers' Party of Korea | Supreme People's Assembly |
| China | 17 November 1975 | Chinese Communist Party | National People's Congress |
| Laos | 2 December 1975 | Lao People's Revolutionary Party | National Assembly |
| Cuba | 24 February 1976 | Communist Party of Cuba | National Assembly of People's Power |
| Vietnam | 2 July 1976 | Communist Party of Vietnam | National Assembly |

== See also ==
- Socialist state
- Soviet democracy
- Soviet (council)
- Soviet republic
- Supreme state organ of power
