= Vasily Zhukov =

Russian historian

Vasily Ivanovich Zhukov (Russian: Васи́лий Ива́нович Жу́ков; born April 1, 1947) is a member of the Russian Academy of Sciences and has a Ph.D. in history. Professor Zhukov is the rector of the Russian State Social University (Российский государственный социальный университет).

== See also ==
- Education in Russia
- List of universities in Russia
