= Democratic revolution =

Revolution in which a democracy is instituted

A democratic revolution is a political science term denoting a revolution in which a democracy is instituted, replacing a previous non-democratic government, or in which revolutionary change is brought about through democratic means.

According to Alexis de Tocqueville, a democracy, as well as other forms of regimes, is a social condition. It holds a moral, philosophical, social and political orientation of a people. It is a way of behaving. This means that revolution in general shape behaviour. For democratic revolution, this behaviour gets more free and equal. Tocqueville's idea of a democratic revolution is that it is a steady advance of equality, which means that over time all people will be more equal.

Democratic revolutions can be divided into different approaches.

- The first approach holds the development of liberation from the autocratic or dictatorial rule. The idea arises that power should be distributed more equally.
- The second approach can be found in the importance of market and the realization that emerged that state socialism was not the best way of ruling a state. This idea of a popular traditional revolution arises when people get enthusiastic about the abolition or fundamental transformation of Marxist-Leninist states.
- The third approach derived from Western social scientists and is in relation to new ways of thinking about changes in the direction of the democracy. This can be seen as change where democracies need to be 'crafted' from above, by forming restrictions. This transformation paradigm holds the importance of strategic skills of elite actors. Mostly in combination with sheer luck, they find a way of manoeuvring under profound uncertainty. On the other hand, change can come from below, as seen in the third wave of democratization. This is what is called social forces. Mass mobilization is put together from below, mostly by the working class.

What makes democratic revolutions different from other forms of revolution is the lack of violence, in most cases. Democratic revolution is not harsh and does not make negative judgements on other cultures or regime types, yet it incorporates a clear notion of reform. Other societies are becoming better and better.

Moreover, revolution is a notion implying sudden discontinuity and movement to a new regime. It is to be said that whenever there is no new regime, a revolution has failed. Democratic revolution, in contrast, does not necessarily imply how long the process will take. Formlessness is an intrinsic problem of democratic revolutions. When transitions can be (mis)interpreted as a long process, it becomes difficult to recede landmarks of failure or success into the flux of political and economic events. It is hard to know when a party is winning because there are no particular great victories or defeats that serve as milestones. An example lies in the democratic revolution of Brazil: "the genius of the Brazilian transformation is that it is virtually impossible to say at what point Brazil stopped being a dictatorship and became a democracy".

== Concepts ==
It involves revising a country's constitution to allow for the people to have the power to have:

- Government be bound to hold a referendum on an issue given a certain percentage of electorate support via petition
- Government be bound to holding a vote of no confidence given a certain percentage of electorate support for a recall to election.
- Government to be held to set terms in office

== Examples ==
- American Revolution
- Carnation Revolution
- Mongolian Revolution of 1990
- Overthrow of Slobodan Milošević
- Peaceful Revolution
- People Power Revolution
- Romanian Revolution
- Singing Revolution
- Tunisian Revolution
- Velvet Revolution

== See also ==
- Colour revolution
