= Vadim Zagladin =

Soviet politician (1927–2006)

Vadim Valentinovich Zagladin (Russian: Вадим Валентинович Загладин; June 23, 1927 – November 17, 2006) was a Soviet and Russian politician and ideologist and one of the leading theoreticians of perestroika. He was a collaborator and adviser to Leonid Brezhnev and Mikhail Gorbachev and, among Soviet politicians, one of those who was the closest to Western Europe. A personal friend of François Mitterrand, Willy Brandt and Giorgio Napolitano, Zagladin was the theorist of a reformed communism that would be very close to European social democracy.

He graduated from the Moscow State Institute of International Relations and taught there from 1949 to 1956. From 1964 to 1988, he was First Deputy Secretary of the International Department of the Central Committee of the Communist Party of the Soviet Union, assisting Secretaries Boris Ponomarev and Anatoly Dobrynin. From 1988 to 1991, he was a close advisor to Gorbachev on perestroika and glasnost, and continued his senior advisory role within the Gorbachev Foundation until his death. He was also vice-president of the Association for Euro-Atlantic Cooperation (AEAC), which promoted links between Russia and NATO.

He was the deviser of the World Summit of Nobel Peace Laureates, chaired by Gorbachev, and a founder of the Permanent Secretariat of World Summit of Nobel Peace Laureates, the official organizer of the event.

He was the author of many books on international relations.

== Works ==
- To Restructure and Humanize International Relations by V. V Zagladin (1989)
- Our Aim: Universal International Security by V. V Zagladin (1986)
- International Working-Class and Communist Movement: Historical Record, 1830s to Mid-1940s
- The Soviet peace philosophy: Peace programme in action by V. V Zagladin (1981)
- The Working-Class Movement in the Period of Transition to Imperialism (1871-1904). by V. V., Editor-In-Chief Zagladin (Jan 1, 1981)
- Europe and the Communists. by V., ed Zagladin (1977)
- Internationalism: The communists' guiding principle by V. V Zagladin (1976)
- The World Communist Movement: Outline of Strategy and Tactics by V. V. (editor) Zagladin (1973)

== Sources ==
- Behind the Desert Storm: A Secret Archive Stolen From the Kremlin that Sheds New Light on the Arab Revolutions in the Middle East by Pavel Stroilov (Jul 1, 2011)
- The End of the Communist Revolution by Robert Vincent Daniels (Apr 19, 1993
- Russia and the Idea of the West by Robert English (Jul 15, 2000)
- Soviet Intervention in Czechoslovakia, 1968: Anatomy of a Decision by Jiri Valenta (Oct 1, 1991)
- Historical Narratives in the Soviet Union and Post-Soviet Russia: Destroying the Settled Past, Creating an Uncertain Future by Thomas D. Sherlock (Apr 17, 2007)
- The Soviet Study of International Relations (Cambridge Russian, Soviet and Post-Soviet Studies) by Allen Lynch (Aug 3, 1989)
- Moscow and the Italian Communist Party by Joan Barth Urban (1986)
- Brezhnev Reconsidered (Studies in Russian and East European History and Society) by Mark Sandle (Jan 18, 2003)
- Soviet-British Relations since the 1970s by Alex Pravda and Peter J. S. Duncan (Apr 27, 1990)
- Soviet Policy Towards Japan: An Analysis of Trends in the 1970s and 1980s (Cambridge Studies in International Relations) by Myles L. C. Robertson (Jan 14, 2010)
- Russia and Globalization: Identity, Security, and Society in an Era of Change (Woodrow Wilson Center Press) by Douglas W. Blum (Mar 26, 2008)

== Sources ==
- World Summit of Nobel Peace Laureates
- Vadim Zagladin at the World Political Forum
- Zagladin on the Importance of Communist Unity, RFE/RL, June 20, 1984
