= Georgy Kim (orientalist) =

Soviet Orientalist (1924–1989)

Georgy Fyodorovich Kim
- Born: 3.11.1924; Sinelnikovo, Far Eastern Oblast, USSR
- Died: 29.04.1989; Moscow, USSR
- Occupation: Сorresponding member of the Academy of Sciences of the Soviet Union since 1976, Director of the Institute of Oriental Studies of the USSR Academy of Sciences (1985–1987)

Academic work
- Discipline: Orientalist
- Sub-discipline: Expert in the History of Korea and liberation movements in Africa and Asia

Georgy Fyodorovich Kim (Russian: Георгий Фёдорович Ким; November 11, 1924 – April 29, 1989) was Soviet orientalist, an expert in the History of Korea and liberation movements in Africa and Asia, corresponding member of the Academy of Sciences of the Soviet Union since 1976.

He played an important role in the restoration of diplomatic relations between the USSR and South Korea (the Primakov–Kim group). One of the outcomes of his work was the CPSU Central Committee’s decision for the USSR to participate in the 1988 Olympic Games in Seoul.

Director of the Institute of Oriental Studies of the USSR Academy of Sciences (1985–1987).

== Awards and decorations ==
- 1980: USSR State Prize
- 1975: Order of the Red Banner of Labour
- 1972: Medal "50 Years of the Mongolian People's Revolution"
- 1947: Medal "For Valiant Labour in the Great Patriotic War 1941–1945"
