= Unified state power =

Political power principle of communist states

Unified state power (Note: This designation, unified power, has been given different names across the communist world. Some of the most common designations are: unity of power, unity of state power, unitary power, unified power, unified state power, state power is unified, unification of state power, unity of legislative and executive powers, unity of executive and legislative powers, unity of all agencies of state authority, unity of all organs of state authority; unity of all agencies of state power, unity of all organs of state power, unity of deliberation and action, unity of discussion and action, and; democratic centralism.) is a Marxist–Leninist principle on communist state power that was developed in opposition to the fusion and separation of powers, and creates the institutional framework to practice democratic centralism in the state. It holds that popular sovereignty is expressed through a single representative organ, the supreme state organ of power (SSOP), at the apex of a pyramid-like state structure and which exercises legislative, executive, judicial, and all other forms of state power. Lower-level state organs of power are not autonomous polities but administrative extensions of the SSOP within a single hierarchy. Central decisions bind subordinate levels, while local organs are accountable both to their electors and to superior organs, a system known as dual subordination. This produces a uniform flow of power from the SSOP to subordinate organs, with local discretion allowed only within jurisdiction delegated by higher law enacted by the SSOP.

The SSOP's relationship to the communist state constitution and laws is fundamental. The constitution, adopted by the SSOP, is the fundamental law binding all state organs. It does not permanently restrict the SSOP's sovereign rights, since such limits are self-imposed and may be altered through constitutional amendment. Communist state constitutions set out broad principles on sovereignty and the structure of the state—while leaving specific details to statutes and secondary norms. Socialist legality, the Marxist–Leninist concept of lawful governance, requires conformity to the constitution. However, it rejects independent or autonomous institutions, such as constitutional courts exercising judicial review, that would stand above the SSOP. Instead, legality is safeguarded through political oversight by representative organs, supervision by the supreme procuratorial organ, and electoral accountability through controlled elections.

A key feature is the unity of legislative and executive powers. Drawing on the Paris Commune and the Soviet model, representatives both make law and oversee its execution. The SSOP establishes a division of labour that delineates jurisdictions among the supreme executive and administrative organ (the government), the supreme judicial organ, and other state organs within the unified state apparatus, but this does not create co-equal branches. Each organ operates under the law within an order established by the SSOP, remaining inferior and subordinate to it, and all are overseen by the SSOP with none standing above it. This is reinforced by the leading role of the communist party, which coordinates the unified state apparatus formally through cadre appointments to state positions and party discipline, and informally through party groups embedded in state institutions. The party guides policy while affirming that the state remains the legal locus of sovereignty. Unified power continues to be a cornerstone of governance in the communist states of China, Cuba, Laos, North Korea and Vietnam.

== Popular sovereignty as the source of unified power ==
=== Theoretical origins ===
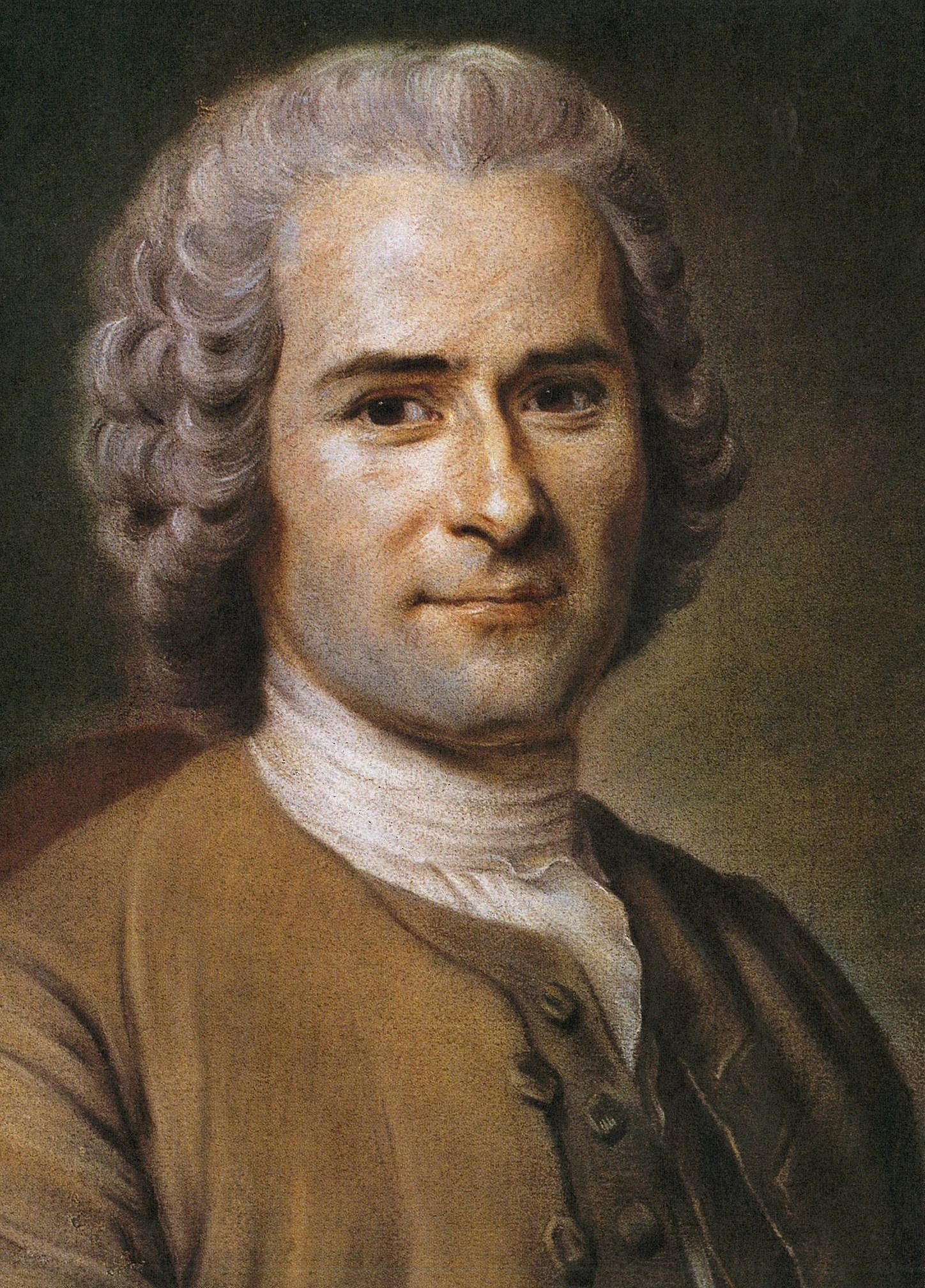
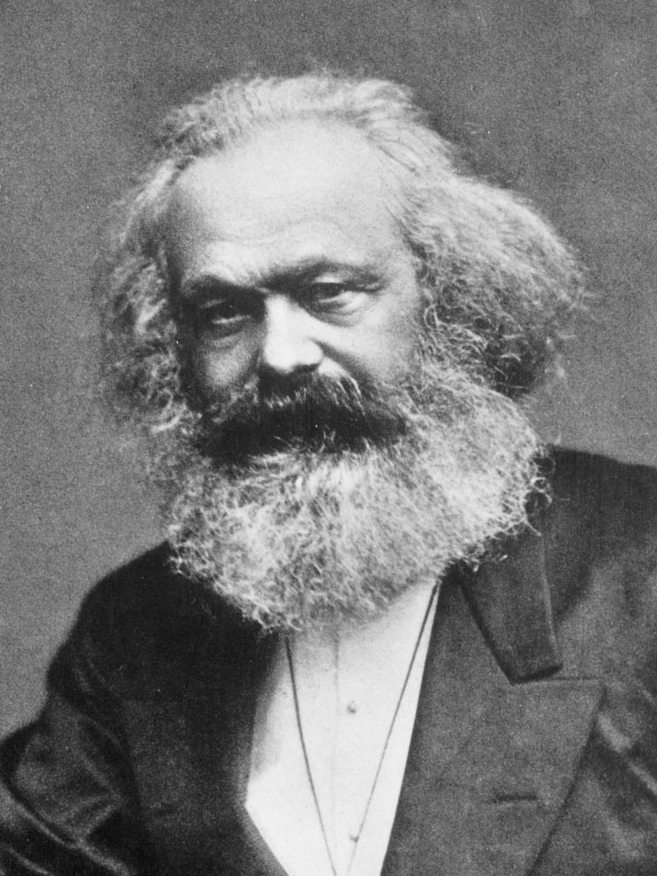
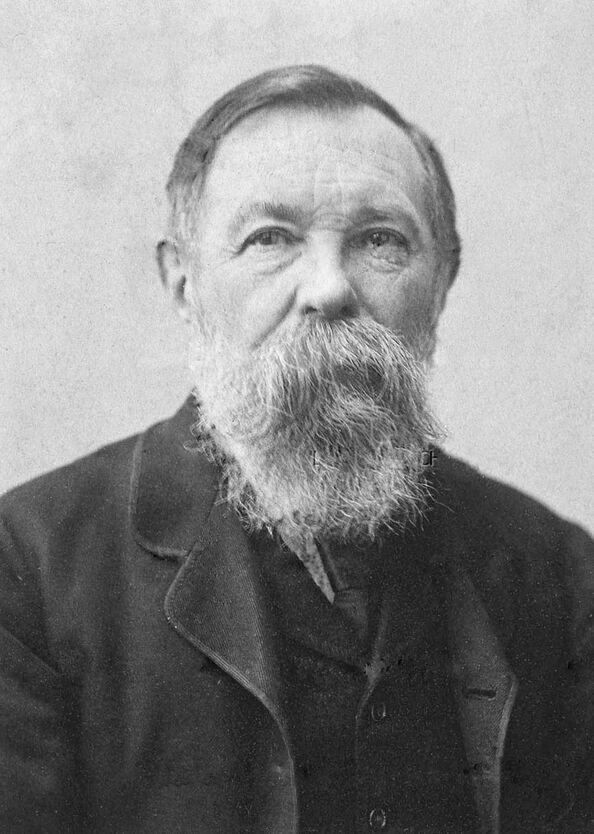
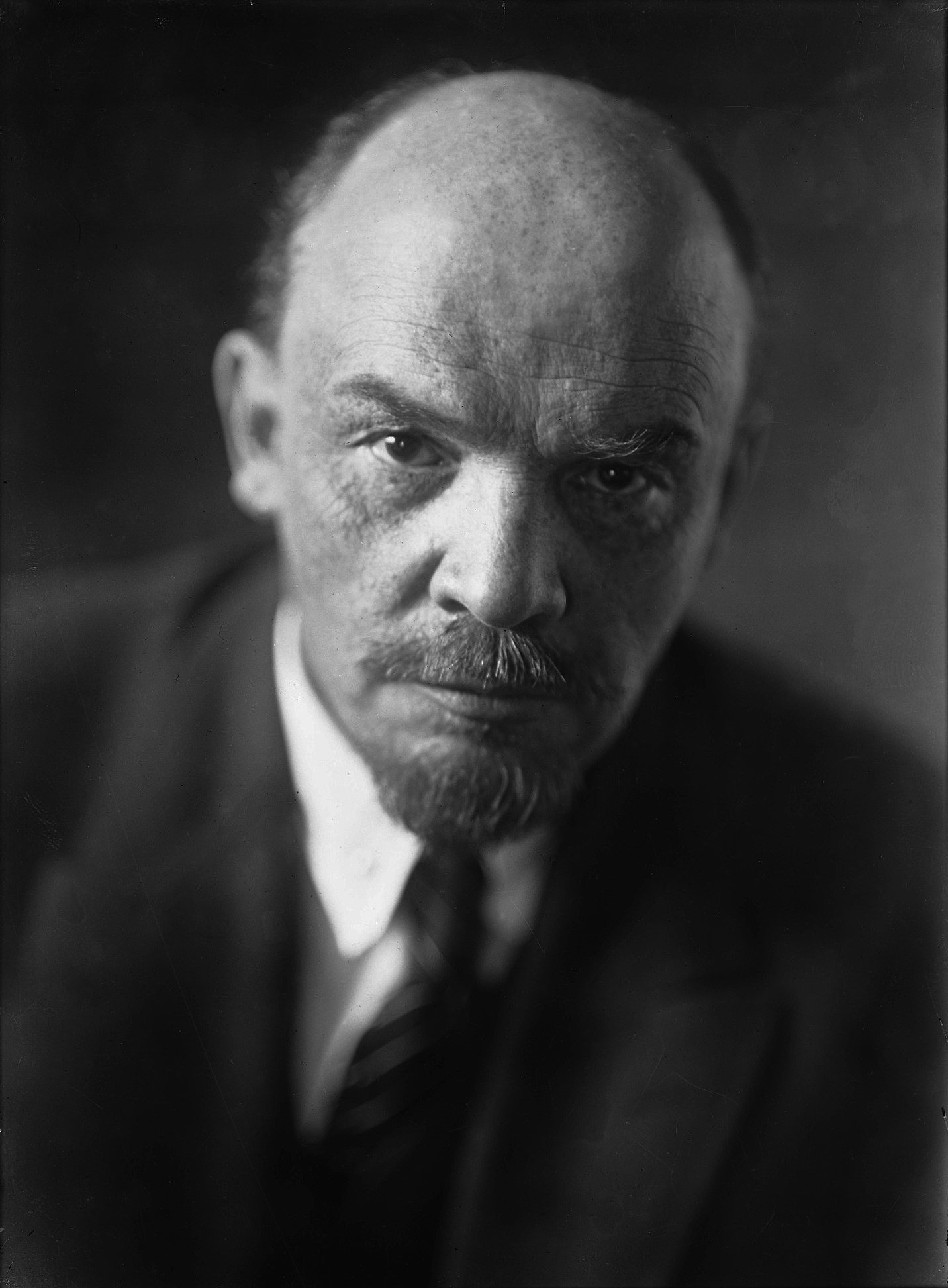
The works of Rousseau, Marx, Engels and Lenin influenced the Marxist–Leninist conception of popular sovereignty.

In Marxist–Leninist theory, the supreme state organ of power is regarded as the institutional expression of popular sovereignty. Elected through popular elections, it is theorised to embody the collective will of the people and to hold the unified powers of the state. As the popular embodiment of state authority, the supreme state organ unites legislative, executive, and judicial functions.

Communist theorists maintain that the Marxist–Leninist concept of popular sovereignty was "developed by" Jean-Jacques Rousseau, who argued that the people formed the foundation of all legitimate state power. It was later refined by Karl Marx and Friedrich Engels. In The Social Contract, Rousseau argued that all state power resided in the people alone, expressed through the general will. This general will, he maintained, was inherently just and directed toward the common good. The people's resolutions were, in principle, always correct, as they were immune to corruption, even if they could be misled.

In Discourse on Inequality, Rousseau further argued for the necessity of a supreme power: "In short, instead of turning our forces against ourselves, let us gather them into one supreme power that governs us according to wise laws." Marxist–Leninist theoretician Đào Trí Úc interprets this as Rousseau's belief that "power cannot be separated, but state power and supreme sovereignty must belong to the people; legislative, executive and judicial powers are only concrete manifestations of the supreme power of the people."

Rousseau's notion of popular sovereignty influenced Marx and Engels's theory of historical materialism. From this perspective, the people are the creators of history because they transform the material base through labour. Here, the material base denotes nature—more precisely, matter as the fundamental substance of reality—so that all phenomena arise from material interactions. Labour on nature generates technology (productive forces) and establishes specific relations of production; together these can incrementally reshape material existence or precipitate a rupture that yields a new mode of production. By extension, the state itself is seen as a human creation: "just as it is not religion that creates people but people create religion, it is not the state system that creates the people, but the people create the state system." The political project of Marx and Engels was therefore to reclaim state power from the ruling classes that had historically wielded it as an instrument of oppression.

Another source of inspiration for Marxist–Leninist practice was the emergence of soviets during the Russian Revolution of 1905. These soviets were seen as both decision-making organs and mass organisations. Lenin argued that the soviets represented a power accessible to all, arising directly from the masses and expressing their will. Although they functioned only briefly and in limited areas, according to scholar Otto Bihari, they assumed all state functions where they existed, acting in the interests of working people.

The soviets re-emerged in the Russian Revolution of 1917, when the Russian Social Democratic Labour Party (Bolsheviks) allied with them. Lenin theorised that the soviets could provide the foundation for a new state. Yet he warned that, if left decentralised, they remained a weak and primitive form of state organisation. To address this, the Bolsheviks advanced the slogan "All Power to the Soviets", seeking to build a nationwide system of soviets that would collectively function as the supreme state organ of power. In his work Can the Bolsheviks Retain the State Power?, Lenin argued that the soviets represented a revolutionary form of state because their elected representatives combined both legislative and executive authority. From his perspective, this amounted to a practical form of anti-parliamentarism.

=== In institutionalised form ===
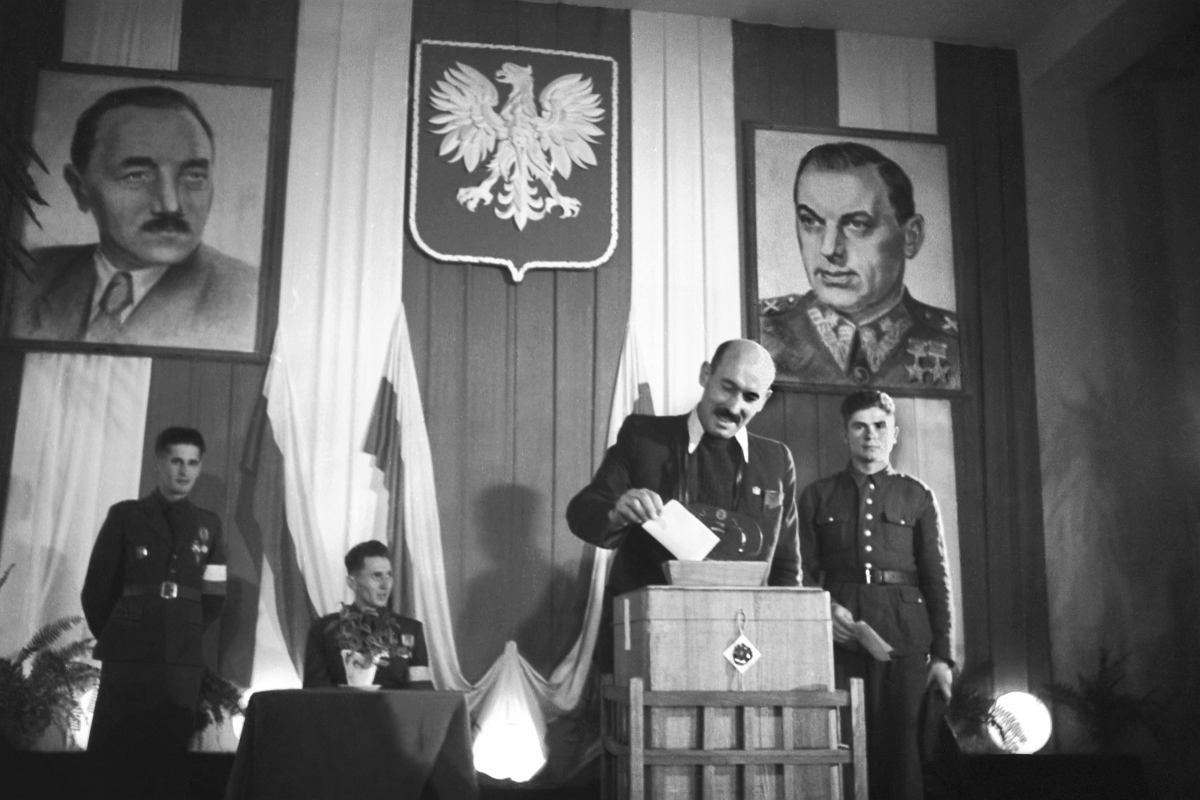
A picture from the 1952 elections of the supreme state organ of power of the Polish People's Republic.

After the October Revolution, the Bolsheviks moved to make the world's first attempt to institutionalise this blend of Rousseauian and Marxian theory of popular sovereignty in Soviet Russia and the Soviet Union. The result was the establishment of a new state form that became the world's first communist state. One of the first decrees instituted by the new Bolshevik state, titled "All Power to the Soviets", on 8 November 1917, conferred all state powers on the All-Russian Congress of Soviets in the Russian Soviet Federative Socialist Republic (Russian SFSR). This decree put an end to dual power, a situation in which the institutions of the soviets and the Russian Provisional Government were competing for state power. The All-Russian Congress of Soviets then adopted a decree that established a Workers' and Peasants' Government that was fully accountable to itself and to the All-Russian Central Executive Committee (All-Russian CEC), an internal organ of the All-Russian Congress. In a bid to strengthen the democratic legitimacy of the soviets, the All-Russian CEC instituted imperative mandates on 7 December 1917 that made all elected representatives recallable.

In this system, the soviets became known as state organs of power, with the highest one being referred to as the supreme state organ of power, and all other organs became accountable to them. For example, an appeal of the People's Commissariat for the Interior stated, "in the communities the agencies of the local power, the soviets, are the administrative agencies, to which all institutions, irrespective of whether economic, financial, or cultural-educational, have to be subordinated." However, the first formal regulation that categorised each state organ was adopted on 30 April 1918 at the Fifth Congress of the Frontier Region of the Turkestan Soviet Federative Republic. This regulation stated that the state form in Turkestan was based on the following four organs: firstly, the supreme state organ of power, secondly, the permanent organ of the supreme state organ of power, thirdly, the supreme executive and administrative organ, and lastly, the local state organs of power.

The system outlined in the Turkestan republic was more or less adopted, with slight modifications, in the world's first communist constitution, the Russian Constitution of 10 July 1918. According to Otto Bihari, this constitution outlined in its tenth article "the principle of unity and the uniform exercise of power", and that all state powers were conferred on the soviets. This constitution conferred on the All-Russian Congress of Soviets the status of SSOP, which meant that it held unlimited state power unless constrained by itself through the state constitution, laws, or other legal documents. Despite its formal powers, it delegated most tasks to its internal state organs or the constitutive organs of the state apparatus. It did so by either electing, removing, or dismissing state organs, electing, removing, or dismissing individuals from positions within state organs, or by establishing or abolishing state organs. The fundamental principles instituted in 1918 were exported to other communist states, and remain fundamentally unchanged. Therefore, in communist states, all state organs are accountable to and function according to the directives of the SSOP and lower-level state organs of power.

"Under the accepted classification, elective and representative organs of the people, the Soviets of Working People's Deputies, from top to bottom, and also the Presidiums of Supreme Soviets of the USSR, and the Union and Autonomous Republics, are the organs of state power. They are at the centre of the whole state apparatus, and constitute its only and abiding foundation. All other state organs are set up by them and are ultimately accountable to them."

— Soviet academics Yuri Dolgopolov and Leonid Grigoryan, in their book, Fundamentals of Soviet State Laws, on the role of the state organs of power in the Soviet Union.

In the 1918 constitution, the people elected the lowest-level organ of state power, and the members of the elected state organ would elect the one at the next hierarchical level. This process would continue until the supreme state organ of power, meaning the All-Russian Congress of Soviets, was elected. The system was eventually amended in the Soviet Union, in which half of the supreme state organ of power was directly elected by the population and the other half indirectly. Other communist states, such as present-day Cuba, Laos, and Vietnam, have an electoral system where all members of the supreme state organ of power are directly elected. In China, the entire supreme state organ of power is elected indirectly. In states like the Soviet Union, the people were empowered to elect candidates; in most cases, the citizen could either vote for or against the candidate or for or against a given list, to the state organs of power, which collectively form the basis of the unified state apparatus. The manner in which these state organs are elected varies from state to state.

The system of soviets outlined in the 1918, 1924, and 1936 Soviet constitutions laid the basis for communist state governance and the Marxist–Leninist theory of popular sovereignty. For example, Article of the 1936 Soviet constitution declared that the soviets formed the political foundation of the Soviet state form. Article 3 declared that the soviets embodied the popular sovereignty of the working population of towns and villages. Similar statements about popular sovereignty have been made in all communist state constitutions. For example, the Czechoslovak Constitution of 1968 declared that the working masses governed the country through the system of state organs of power, and the 1972 North Korean constitution did the same.

Soviet theoreticians Yuri Dolgopolov and Leonid Grigoryan legitimised this system by stating that state power in communist states represented the primary means of popular governance and, therefore, reflects the will and sovereignty of the people. They believed that state power—and, by extension, the supreme organ of state power—operated on behalf of the people and served as the primary instrument of their will. This unified power allowed the state to achieve a characteristic known as state sovereignty. State sovereignty, they contended, ensures that the communist states are independent of any other state or societal power in the exercise of their functions, both domestically and in their relations with other states. Therefore, they believed, the sovereignty of communist states strengthened their internal popular sovereignty. They also asserted that the laws and resolutions passed by the state organs of power represented the will of the people, dictated state policy, and guided the actions of the unified state apparatus. Due to their formal function, the state organs of power were widely believed, according to Dolgopolov and Grigoryan, to form the core of the future stateless and pure communist system of public self-administration that communist states purportedly try to establish.

The communist theory of popular sovereignty has met with criticism. Scholar George C. Guins concludes, when writing about the Soviet Union, "there is no popular sovereignty in the Soviet Union because the people cannot either freely form opinion or express it by free elections." So, while the formal powers of the supreme state organ of power state that the people are the holders of the unlimited political powers of the state, Guins believes this to be a disguise for the communist party's monopoly on state power. Academic Ivan Volgyes concurs with Guins, noting, "[Unified power] is thus based on both the mandate derived from controlled elections and from Marxist ideology. A vote of no confidence, which would topple the government elsewhere, is simply unthinkable under the Communist system." Scholar Hans Peters believed the Marxist–Leninist conception of popular sovereignty to be outdated, arguing, "The identification of the people with the [SSOP] practised in [communist] Eastern Europe as a senseless interpretation the Rousseauist concept of democracy [...] is not of progressive nature, but feeds on the ideas of the 19th century."

=== Administrative extension of state power ===
In communist states, the supreme state organ of power (SSOP) was regarded as the highest expression of state power, while lower-level state organs of power could exercise state power only "within the compass of their jurisdiction". Popular sovereignty was understood to flow directly from the people to the SSOP, which in turn delegated responsibilities to subordinate organs. Some constitutions emphasised that the lower-level state organs of power derived their state power from the people, but only within their territorial jurisdiction. In this way, they held "supreme local power", though always subject to the SSOP and other central state organs. Constitutions typically stressed that central decisions were binding on the lower-level state organs of power, and that these organs were accountable both to their electors and to higher state organs, a principle codified as dual subordination.

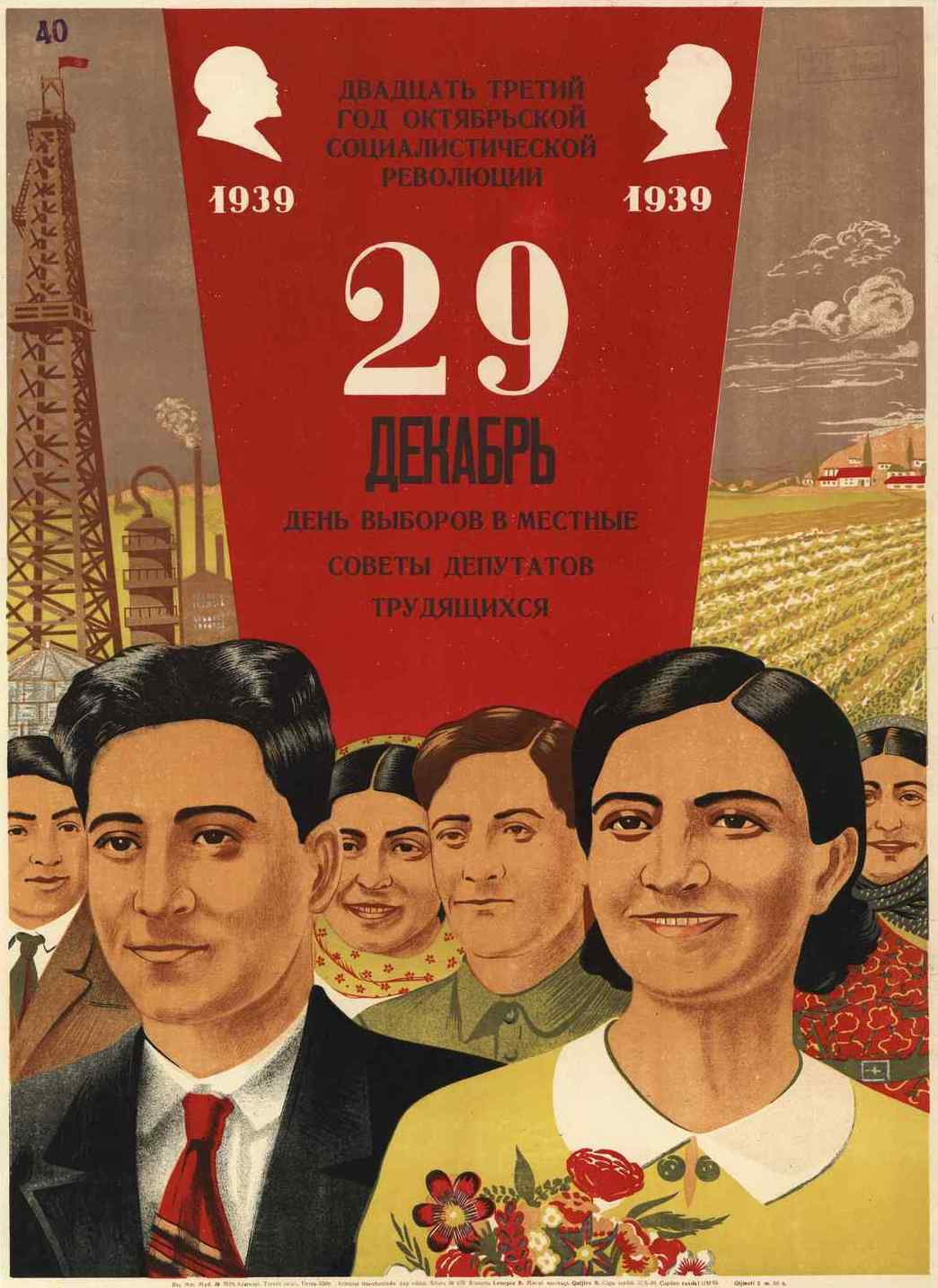
An election poster from the Azerbaijani Soviet Socialist Republic promoting the 1939 elections of local state organs of power.

Soviet constitutional thought applied the principle of the unity of state power to this relationship. Local state organs of power were not conceived as autonomous self-governing institutions but as integral parts of a single hierarchy. Article 3 of the 1936 Soviet Constitution declared that all power in the Soviet Union was vested in the working people through their state organs of power, a formula interpreted to mean that organs from village and town up to the SSOP expressed the same unified state power. Theoretician Alexei Lepeshkin argued that this was evident in the identical way such organs functioned: holding sessions, electing deputies, and forming executive committees. Lower-level state organs of power were therefore considered administrative extensions of the SSOP, ensuring a uniform flow of state power from the centre to the localities.

Communist constitutions adopted different approaches to the jurisdiction of local state organs of power. Some provided for complete central regulation of powers by the SSOP, others left limited scope for local organs in areas not covered by higher legislation, and a few granted meaningful autonomy. Most states pursued centralised models, while Yugoslavia developed the most extensive form of local self-administration. Romania's 1965 constitution stressed the unified powers of the central state organs, whereas Yugoslavia's 1974 constitution recognised communes as basic socio-political units in a bottom-up federal structure. Czechoslovakia's 1967 National Committee Act granted ordinance-making powers that promoted local self-government.

Legislation across Europe reflected this diversity. Czechoslovakia replaced its 1960 framework with the 1967 National Committee Act, while East Germany passed new laws in 1965 and 1973. Bulgaria relied on its 1951 Act on People's Councils, amended repeatedly and supplemented in 1965 and 1969. In the Soviet Union, reforms in 1968 strengthened village and settlement state organs of power, followed by republican and federal legislation in the 1970s. Romania adopted consolidated acts in 1968 and 1973, Poland revised its councils in 1972 and 1973, and Yugoslavia regulated communes through federal, republican, and provincial constitutions and ordinances.

Hungary pursued experimental reforms through Law Decree No. 8 of 1965, culminating in the 1971 constitutional Act on Councils. This introduced direct elections for village, district, and town state organs of power, while higher-level organs were chosen by subordinate ones. It ended the dual subordination of specialised administrative organs by placing them directly under local councils, though all remained under the Council of Ministers. These reforms across communist states centred on two issues: the balance between central and local subordination, and the scope of jurisdiction and decision-making granted to local and regional organs.

The 1936 Soviet Constitution, though concise, entrenched a hierarchical model of control. The 1937 Constitution of the RSFSR gave the Presidium of the Supreme Soviet power to annul decrees of krai and oblast state organs of power, while the Council of People's Commissars could suspend acts of lower executive committees. Executive committees and specialised administrative organs were thus accountable both to their electing organ and to higher executive structures. This created what became known as the 'classical' Soviet model: a uniform chain of power extending from village organs up to the Supreme Soviet and its Presidium.

This model emphasised the separation of representative state organs of power from organs of state administration. In principle, administrative organs could not direct state organs of power, but constitutional provisions allowed them to suspend local decisions—even if merely expedient rather than unlawful—and their norms were universally binding. Executive committees were subordinated to both higher committees and their own representative organ, embedding the dual subordination principle. Variations of this model appeared in the constitutions of Poland and Hungary in the 1940s and 1950s.

By the 1960s, constitutional models diverged further. Mongolia's 1960 constitution closely followed the Soviet framework. Romania's 1965 constitution emphasised specialised subordination, reinforced in 1973 with the creation of a Committee of People's Councils under party–state supervision. Czechoslovakia's 1960 constitution and the 1967 National Council Act added operative oversight, requiring higher-level state organs of power to consider the activities of lower ones and issue corrective measures. Yugoslavia, by contrast, stressed the independence of communes, whose rights and duties were defined by constitutions and ordinances. Romania restructured the local state organs of power in 1967–1968 by consolidating into two tiers—communities, towns, and counties—and by aligning party leadership with the state organs of power, as party first secretaries were elected to head them. In East Germany, the 1974 constitution mentioned local state organs of power only briefly, noting that the Council of State and Council of Ministers supported and coordinated their activity.

=== Constitution and laws ===
Lenin argued that every state formation was controlled by a ruling class using it for its own material interests. In communist states, this meant the proletariat led by the communist vanguard party wielded power through its representative organs to suppress class enemies and construct socialism. In the early years of Soviet rule, there was debate over whether law would ultimately wither away with the state or remain a tool of the new state. Soviet jurist Andrey Vyshinsky resolved the issue by insisting that law persisted under socialism as an instrument of the proletarian state.

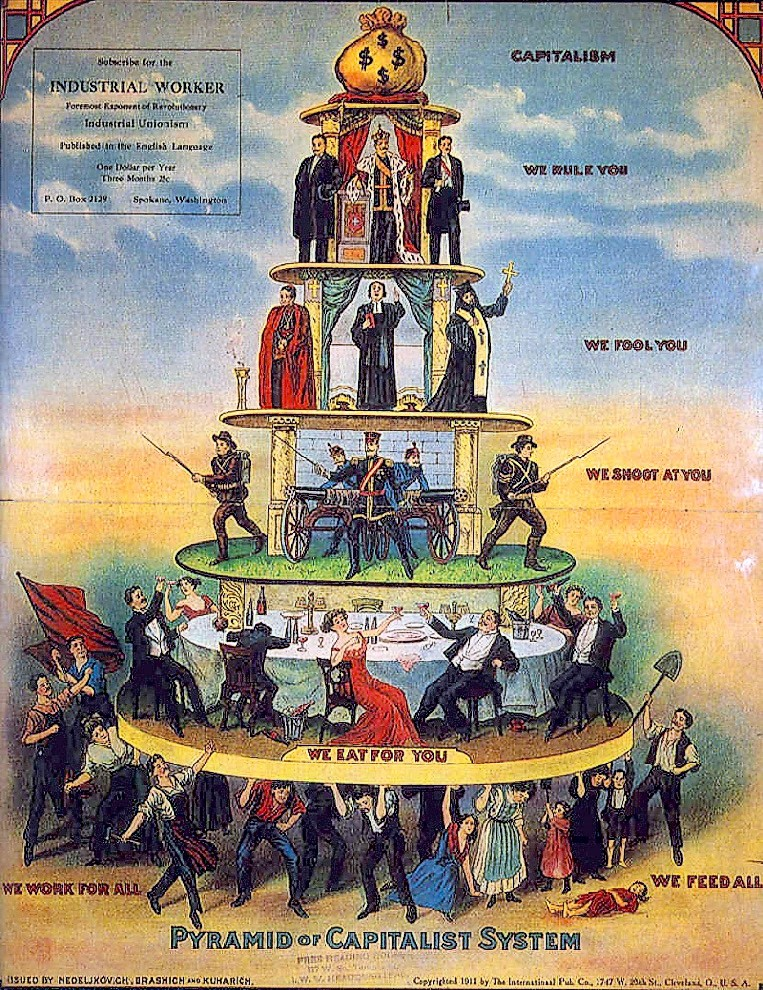
Marxist–Leninists believe that the state is an instrument of the ruling class, which means, by extension, that the constitution and the legal systems are tools to strengthen its powers over the ruled.

Vyshinsky defined socialist law as rules of conduct expressing the will of the ruling class, established through legislation by the SSOP or sanctioned customs. He stressed that these norms were enforced by the coercive power of the state to protect and develop the material base and political order of socialism. This interpretation reinforced the primacy of the SSOP. Since the SSOP was the highest embodiment of popular sovereignty, the constitution could not restrict it. Constitutional provisions thus amounted to a form of self-restraint, alterable through amendment. This emphasis on unity of power contrasted with liberal doctrines of separation of powers, which divided authority between different branches.

In theoretical terms, communist state constitutions were considered fundamental laws, distinct from ordinary legislation. For example, the Hungarian SSOP, known as the National Assembly, could pass both laws and resolutions, but the constitution was recognised as supreme, requiring a qualified majority for constitutional amendment. While ordinary laws regulated specific matters in detail, communist state constitutions set out general principles governing sovereignty, economic organisation, state structure, and citizens' rights. These constitutions were comprehensive, covering political foundations, economic order, the SSOP and lower-level state organs of power, the supreme executive and administrative organ, the supreme judicial organ, the supreme procuratorial organ, and electoral systems. Yet they remained broad in scope, leaving details to ordinary legislation. This "bird's eye view" distinguished communist constitutions from legal codes, which were narrower but more detailed.

The idea of safeguarding the constitution in communist states was closely linked to socialist legality: the obligation of state organs and citizens to observe the constitution as binding law. Unlike liberal systems with judicial review, communist states rejected any institutions, whether independent or autonomous, that could be placed above the SSOP. Instead, constitutionalism was safeguarded by political oversight, the supervision of legality by the supreme procuratorial organ and lower-level procuratorial organs, and electoral accountability. Communist theorists contrasted this with what they called the "fictitiousness" of bourgeois constitutions, which they argued often proclaimed rights that were undermined by the capitalist ruling class. Communist constitutions were presented as genuine because they codified the actual economic and political foundations of society and united political principles with enforceable legal norms.

Safeguarding constitutionalism was considered a shared responsibility. The procuracy supervised legality in state organs, while the party ensured consistency with constitutional principles. Legislative committees could also monitor constitutionality, but constitutional courts, common in liberal states, were rejected as incompatible with the supremacy of representative organs. Yugoslavia and later Czechoslovakia were exceptions, though their courts were established as state organs subordinate to the SSOP. Ultimately, communist constitutions were portrayed as stable, exclusive, and authentic. They derived state power from adoption by the SSOP, regulated fundamental aspects of political and economic life, and occupied the highest place in the legal hierarchy. Their effectiveness depended on procuratorial oversight, party leadership, and citizen compliance, presenting them as the binding foundation of the communist state order.

Historically, the first communist constitution, adopted in 1918, granted the All-Russian Congress of Soviets and its Central Executive Committee authority over constitutional adoption and amendment. The 1936 Soviet constitution reaffirmed that only the Supreme Soviet could exercise this power. This model spread to other communist states. Later constitutions placed greater emphasis on popular participation for constitutional amendments. The constitutions of Laos and Vietnam required public consultation, and Cuba mandated national referendums for constitutional change. In China, Zhang Wenxian has argued that this framework ensures the unity of party leadership, popular mastery, and the rule of law, with the constitution reflecting the material base of society.

== The unified powers of the supreme state organ of power ==
=== Theoretical origins ===
The idea of unified power has its theoretical origins in the Marxist–Leninist rejection of the separation of powers, checks and balances and parliamentarism. Karl Marx, the founder of Marxism, was sceptical of the state more generally, and the executive powers of the state more specifically, throughout his life. According to Marxist–Leninists, in their self-perceived bid to stop the abuse of power, the bourgeoisie, according to Otto Bihari, "cast down parliament from the summit of power and, degraded it to the rank of a simple legislative machinery, often radically curtailing even these powers following the American example." In the classical Marxist interpretation, the strengthening of boundaries between the executive government and the parliamentary legislature had the unintended consequence of making the former independent and uncontrolled by the latter. It did not help either that the legislatures of the nineteenth century often instituted rules to prevent working-class representation.

Marx believed what he perceived as the modern constitutions of the dictatorship of the bourgeoisie invested too much power in the executive at the expense of the legislature. For example, he criticised the French Constitution of 1848 for replacing the hereditary monarchy with an elected monarch in the form of the president of the republic. That is, Marx believed the separation of powers increased the president's power at the expense of the popularly elected legislature, concluding that the 1848 constitution had created a system with "two heads [...] the Legislative Assembly, on the one hand, the President, on the other."

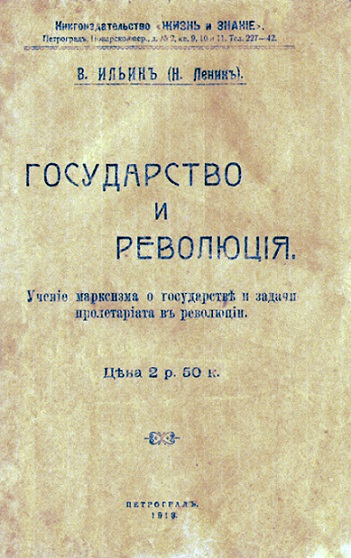
Marx's The Civil War in France and Lenin's State and Revolution made a sizable impact on the Marxist–Leninist conception of the communist state.

While Marx and his longtime collaborator, Friedrich Engels, never theorised on the future form of the modern post-capitalist state, they were positively inclined towards the Paris Commune. In later years, after their deaths, Marxist–Leninists began perceiving the Paris Commune as a prototype communist state. The commune instituted a governance system in which legislative and executive powers were unified in the Commune Council. Marx, in his pamphlet The Civil War in France, considered this a positive trait, noting that the Commune Council was a "working, not a parliamentary, body, executive and legislative at the same time." He also noted, with praise, that "Not only municipal administration, but the whole initiative hitherto exercised by the state was laid into the hands of the Commune [Council]."

The term to note in Marx's praise of the Paris Commune is, according to Otto Bihari, "working organ". Marx rejected the classical liberal understanding of the separation of executive and legislative powers, a view also shared by Rousseau. The Commune Council, unlike the liberal legislatures, was a working organ since it held executive and legislative powers. However, it is also clear that executive powers also entail the administrative powers of the state more generally. Marx also noted that the Commune Council had "stripped" [the police] of its political attributes, and turned into the responsible and at all times revocable agent of the Commune." Marxist–Leninist theorists interpreted this as the theoretical origins of the idea of the unified state apparatus headed by the SSOP. According to Marx, the Commune Council was a positive model of representation since, firstly, it was directly accountable to the populace, and secondly, the people held unlimited state power through their elected representatives.

In his book, The State and Revolution, Vladimir Lenin tries to develop Marx's ideas. In it, Lenin claimed, similarly to Marx, that the Paris Commune offered a more effective form of representation than the corrupt and self-serving parliaments of capitalist societies. He argued that true freedom of opinion and discussion should not lead to deception, as it did under the dictatorship of the bourgeoisie, which represented, according to himself, a "democracy for an insignificant minority, democracy for the rich—that is the democracy of capitalist society."

Lenin held the view that within the Commune Council, the merging of legislative and executive powers established a framework in which elected officials are required to enact and carry out their own laws, and communicate directly with the constituents who selected them. He concluded that, unlike under parliamentarism, the prototype state form of the Paris Commune created a new state form: "Representative institutions remain, but there is no parliamentarism here as a special system, as the division of labour between the legislative and the executive, as a privileged position for the deputies." In Lenin's view, this system was the opposite of parliamentarism and the separation of powers, since in this system the bureaucrat, elected representative, legislator, and executor were merged into a single individual. Soviet theoreticians Dolgopolov and Grigoryan concurred with Lenin, concluding that "the blend of legislative and executive powers is a most important feature of the socialist organisation of power."

Lenin's anti-parliamentarism was also characterised by an opposition to the separation of powers: he condemned the "con" that is the separation of powers. He championed the unity of state governance, where the state organs of the unified state apparatus would be subordinated to the national elected representative organ, which eventually evolved into the SSOP. From Lenin's perspective, it was of utmost importance to free the people from an uncontrolled and arbitrary state apparatus. The aim was to create a system that prevented the other state organs, with their specialised powers, from becoming independent branches of state.

This, combined with the fact that Russia completely lacked a parliamentary and liberal democratic tradition, strengthened Lenin's bid to create a new and unique state form. Theoretician Istvan Kovács admits that the anti-parliamentary policies of Lenin and the Bolsheviks were aided by the total lack of a liberal democratic tradition: "The merger of the legislative and executive functions was appreciably promoted by the almost total lack of a deeply rooted structure of the division of powers attached to the parliamentary system."

=== Unity of legislative and executive powers ===
The Russian communists established the world's first SSOP, the All-Russian Congress of Soviets, when it convened for its first session on 16 June 1917. Lenin, in a speech to the 7th Congress of the Russian Communist Party (Bolsheviks) in March 1918, noted the importance of uniting executive and legislative powers in the SSOP, saying the party needed to abolish "parliamentarism (as the separation of legislative from executive work); [institute] the unifying of legislative and executive State work. The merging of administration and legislation." On presenting the draft for the world's first communist constitution to the All-Russian Congress of Soviets in July that same year, Yuri Steklov, a member of the constitutional drafting committee, stated that unlike bourgeois constitution that set up an artificial separation of state powers this constitution aimed to concentrate state powers ("legislative, executive, judicial") into one organ: the All-Russian Congress of Soviets and its internal organs, the Central Executive Committee and the Council of People's Commissars.

Initially, the Russian communists made several attempts to strengthen the unity of legislative and executive powers within the soviets. The Bolsheviks actively tried to increase the activities of elected representatives in the state organs, strengthening accountability and clarifying their executive powers. For example, the Seventh All-Russian Congress of Soviets, held in December 1919, made it clear that elected representatives were required to report on their work to their electors every two weeks. If they failed to do so, they would lose their mandates. Three years later, in 1922, the All-Armenian Congress of Soviets, the SSOP of the Armenian Socialist Soviet Republic, sought to clarify Articles 67 and 68 of its republican constitution.

The Armenian SSOP sought to outline the responsibilities of the lower-level state organs of power, specifically detailing the obligations of elected representatives within the executive committees of these same state organs of power. These responsibilities comprised: (a) being present at meetings, (b) engaging in committees and sections, (c) carrying out resolutions from meetings and presidiums, (d) submitting regular updates on their work and the activities of the relevant organs, and (e) promptly fulfilling higher-level directives. After the creation of the Soviet Union in 1922, these same processes were attempted enacted at the All-Union level. The 1924 Soviet constitution clarified further the unity of legislative and executive powers, bestowing the All-Union Congress of Soviets and its Central Executive Committee to decide on "all questions which they deem to be subject to their determination".

The Marxist–Leninist critique, according to Dolgopolov and Grigoryan, states that the separation of powers attempts to separate the state from class by claiming the state stands above and outside the class issue. Montesquieu, the prime formulator of the separation of powers, falsely concluded, they charged, that the state should be separated into separate branches so as to ensure the fair and proper administration of state affairs. In such a society, Dolgopolov and Grigoryan conclude, the state can be nothing more than a tool of the ruling class. In contrast, Marxist–Leninists believe that capitalist society is centred on antagonistic classes that struggle for their own material interests and that, by extension, it makes no sense to talk about a state above class interests or a state without a ruling class.

=== Unity of state power through the division of labour ===
"One of the basic principles of the constitutional systems of [communist states], principally derived from the influence of Soviet constitutionalism, is the principle of the unity of state powers based on the assignment of all legislative and executive powers of state to its representative democratic body. This representative political organ is the supreme organ of state power and the only one able to create law and control the activities of all other state organs."

— Venezuelan academic Allan R. Brewer-Carías on the unity of state power and the integration of executive and legislative powers in communist states.

With the 1936 constitution, Soviet ideologues emphasized both the unified power of the SSOP and the need for a clearer division of labour among state organs. The All-Union Supreme Soviet, designated as the SSOP, was formally granted a monopoly on legislative powers, justified by the growing complexity of the Soviet economy and the need for more precise institutional boundaries. Despite these changes, the constitution reaffirmed that all state power emanated from the Supreme Soviet, with other central organs remaining subordinate to it and its permanent organ, the Presidium. The division of labour, however, was explicitly distinguished from the separation of powers, which remained opposed.

Unity of state power was defined as each state organ having its own jurisdiction and granted state power in line with that demarcation, and that these organs operated within the limits set by the SSOP. The constitution entrenched this hierarchy by empowering the SSOP to create or abolish other state organs, elect the heads of the supreme judicial organ and the supreme procuratorial organ, and supervise subordinate organs. Article 31 of the constitution confirmed that the SSOP exercised all the rights of the Soviet state, but also specified that it could not interfere in the lawful functions of other organs, such as the supreme executive and administrative organ or the procuracy.

The constitution also categorised four types of organs—the state organ of power, the administrative organ, the supreme judicial organ, and the supreme procuratorial organ—a model later exported to other communist states. Although each exercises state power on behalf of the people, the SSOP and the lower-level state organs of power are considered unique because they are directly elected and thus embody rights arising from popular sovereignty. This distinction gives them primacy over other state organs.

A recurring issue raised in this constitution, and later constitutions of communist states, concerns the division of labour between state organs of power and executive and administrative organs. While constitutions identify the state organs of power as legislatures, the boundary between law-making and execution is often blurred. In communist Hungary, for example, the constitution reserved the right to amend the constitution for the National Assembly but permitted the delegation of most other functions, leaving the scope of legislative power dependent on practice rather than strict theory. Theoretical attempts to draw a strict line between representative and administrative functions have been hard to come by in communist states. Experience suggested that competences should be determined by practice, with state organs of power retaining substantive roles in governance. This was seen as necessary to prevent executive dominance and to preserve the representative organs as institutions of sovereignty. Czechoslovak constitutional theory advanced the notion of "uniform organs of dual competency", whereby national committees, the name of republican-level state organs of power in Czechoslovakia, functioned simultaneously as representative and administrative organs.

=== Coordination of the SSOP and the organs of the unified state apparatus ===
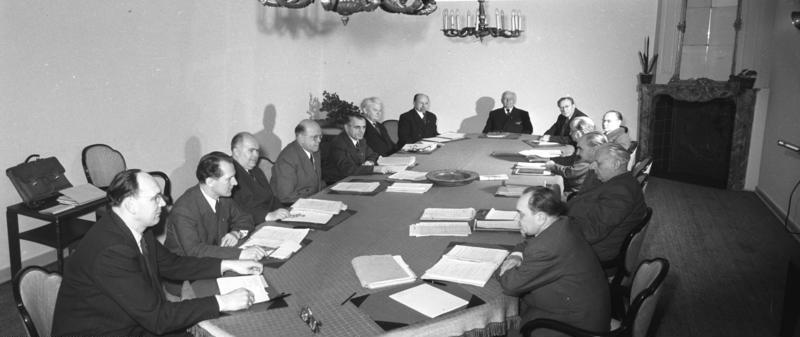
The politburo of the Socialist Unity Party of Germany, the ruling party of East Germany. The party is responsible for guiding the activities of the SSOP in communist states.

Formally, in accordance with unified power, the supreme state organ of power holds the unlimited powers of the state, and by extension, coordinates, controls and leads the work of the other state organs. However, the SSOP and the other state organs of the unified state apparatus also work under the guidance of the communist party, which according to Marxist−Leninist thought, acts as the vanguard party of the proletariat and the working masses in a communist state. Due to its position, it coordinates the work of the state organs within the unified state apparatus. It has two methods of doing it. Formally, it does so by controlling the SSOP and the lower-level state organs of power. Informally, it does so by colonising the state apparatus by creating party groups within it, which report to the highest organs of the communist party. This system evolved gradually and was formalised for the first time in communist history with the 1936 Soviet constitution.

The communist party tries to actively involve itself in the decision-making process of the SSOP and other state organs. For example, according to Stalin, the SSOP did not make a single decision on questions of political and organisational importance without the communist party's involvement. He believed this system ensured the "highest expression" of the party's leading role in Soviet society.

Soviet academics Mikhail Kirichenko and Andrey Denisov, in their book Soviet State Law, claimed, "The efficient and well-coordinated work of the Soviet state organs would be impossible without a single guiding and organizing force. This guiding force is the Communist Party and its militant headquarters, the Central Committee." They stressed that this did not mean that the party replaced the state organs, but rather that they formed the leading group within these state organs. From their perspective, this was ensured by the party getting the most qualified party members to serve in key state positions. These members then lead the state organs in question and ensure that the state adopts and implements the party's guidance. However, they also stressed in the book that "every state organ is guided by the directives of the Party when planning its work."

The party guides the state through internal congresses, conferences, central committee sessions, and meetings by the central leading organs of the party. At these conventions, the party figures discuss questions on state affairs and governance. Kirichenko and Denisov claim that this working method ensures that "the Party guides the work of the state organs without supplanting them." The official intention is to ensure that the party guides the state, but does not supplant the state organs in the process. The decisions adopted by this convention are sent to the state organs for execution. The party's involvement does not stop there, as it also participates in controlling the implementation of the policy. To exemplify, Kirichenko and Denisov point to the joint decision of the Soviet permanent organ of the supreme state organ of power and the supreme executive and administrative organ on 25 June 1932 on legality. In that case, the party issued a separate directive to all party organisations, calling for all party members to assist the state in implementing the decision in question.

== Evolution ==
=== China ===
"In our country, the National People's Congress is the supreme state organ of power, which embodies the will of the people of the whole country and exercises national sovereignty on behalf of the people of the whole country. It is above other central organs, neither on an equal footing nor constrained by them. On the contrary, other central organs are organised by it, and must implement the laws and resolutions it makes, and are accountable to and supervised by it in the process of implementing laws and resolutions."

— Chinese academic Xu Chongde, who served as one of the key drafters of China's 1982 constitution.

In Chinese political terminology, what other communist states called unified power has been commonly coined "the unity of deliberation and action". In other cases, it has been subsumed into the more general term, democratic centralism, which is directly stipulated in the constitution. Others, such as academic Wang Xu, contend that "the essence of democratic centralism is the unity of deliberation and action". According to scholar Huang Guozheng, unified power combines centralisation with democracy, unlike the separation of powers, which is a combination of decentralisation and democracy. When the SSOP and lower-level state organs (called the system of people's congress in China) implement unified policies, it is referred to as the "unified exercise of state power".

Dong Biwu, a leading communist figure who served as president of the Supreme People's Court, surmised the Chinese approach to unified power as follows, "our system is unified in deliberation and action, and the organs exercising state power are the people's congresses at all levels and the people's governments at all levels that they produce." Scholar Du Qiangqiang surmises the Chinese state system as follows: "In our country's state power allocation system, the National People's Congress [the Chinese SSOP] occupies a superior position as the supreme state organ of power, implementing unified exercise of state power on behalf of the people."

Since the SSOP acts as the embodiment of the popular will, some scholars, such as Zhai Xiaobo, when writing on the Chinese SSOP, have concluded that the SSOP cannot act unconstitutionally. The reason is that the SSOP is entrusted with the state's unlimited power and stands above all other state organs; no other organs supervise it. Academic Huang Mingtao disagrees, noting that as the holder of unlimited state power, it cannot itself threaten the constitutional order it creates. Moreover, its powers are delegated by the people, and so the people have the right to call out unconstitutional acts, he opines.

Upon presenting the draft constitution of the 1954 constitution, Liu Shaoqi, as the Vice Chairman of the People's Republic of China, stated, "The National People's Congress of our country exercises the highest state power in complete unity." Researchers Zhang Mingshu and Tong Dezhi echoed the same line in 2022, "The organs of state power are the representative organs of the people, and their powers are supreme, unified and indivisible." However, while the 1954 line remains more-or-less unchanged, the 1982 constitution did seek to give more emphasis on the division of labour and power deconcentration.

However, the clarification of the division of labour did not reduce China's SSOP formal role, according to Peng Zhen, one of the drafters of the constitution and the chair of the permanent organ of the supreme state organ of power: "In our country power can and must be uniformly exercised by the people's congress: At the same time, under this premise, there is also a clear division of the state's executive, adjudicatorial power, procuratorial power, and leadership of the armed forces, so that the organs of state power and other state organs such as administrative, judicial, and procuratorial organs can work in a coordinated manner."

Du Qiangqiang stresses that, unlike the separation of powers, the division of labour is not about establishing a balanced relationship between state institutions. For example, in classical separation of powers models, the constitution seeks to create a balance among executive, legislative, and judicial powers to promote stability and prevent the abuse of power. The division of labour principle refers to how the supreme state organ of power allocates powers among state organs. Meaning that the state organs elected by the SSOP are inferior to it, which stands in complete opposition to the principles of checks and balances.

This is stressed til this day, for example by Xi Jinping, the sitting general secretary of the Chinese Communist Party Central Committee: "We must adhere to and improve the system and principles of democratic centralism, promote all kinds of state organs to improve their capabilities and efficiency, enhance coordination and cooperation, form a strong joint force in governing the country, and effectively prevent the phenomenon of mutual constraints and serious internal friction." By mutual constraints and serious internal friction, Xi indirectly criticised the separation of powers.

=== Vietnam ===
The Vietnamese unified power tradition stresses that state power emanates from the sovereign people and is delegated by them to the Vietnamese SSOP. This is why, according to Vietnamese academic Nguyễn Anh Phương, Vietnam's constitution designates the SSOP, the National Assembly of Vietnam, as "the highest representative body of the People" and as the state's supreme state organ of power. Because of the role granted to the SSOP and the lower-level state organs of power, the constitution makes clear that "The People shall exercise the state power in the form of direct democracy and of representative democracy through the National Assembly, People's Councils and other state agencies."

Nguyễn Văn Đáng, a party researcher, argues that unified power means that Vietnam does not practice the separation of powers as observed in Western liberal democracies. He further explains that in Vietnam, state organs operate based on the principle of division of labour, where each organ is assigned distinct functions and jurisdiction. However, these organs do not function independently; instead, they collaborate with one another, ensuring that each organ fulfills its role while also monitoring the activities of the others.

Unlike the separation of powers model, Nguyễn Văn Đáng argues, state organs within a unified power framework coordinate and collaborate with one another. Rather than functioning as counterweights that restrict each other, they act as partners. This contrasts with the traditional separation of power model, he argues, where independent state branches maintain checks and balances over each other.

Vietnamese legal theorist Nguyễn Anh Phương posits that the mechanisms of delegation, coordination, and control are established through several factors. First, power is delegated to the SSOP by the people. Second, the SSOP, by codifying a constitution and adopting laws, establishes the framework of delegation, coordination, and control of the other state organs. Third, there is a focus on the SSOP's coordination and control over these state organs. Lastly, the process includes a balanced and effective examination and restraint of mutual power, carried out during the execution of specific tasks and powers as prescribed by law. All this ensures that the disparate state organs, unlike in separation of powers system, work with the same end in mind, according "Although the three powers of the legislature, executive and judiciary have different functions, tasks and powers, they are all unified in the common political goal of building a state of rich people, strong country, democratic, fair and civilised society as our Party has pointed out."

Historically, Vietnam had followed the traditional path drawn by the Soviets, in which utmost centralisation was seen as a public good. However, by the 1992 constitution, Vietnamese leaders had concluded unified power was not synonymous with centralisation. Presently, several theorists claim that one has to create a balance between centralisation and decentralisation, while others, legal scholar Nguyễn Đăng Dung, contend that to build a socialist rule of law state, "the State that must be organised according to the principle of decentralisation of power". This represents a radical departure from the path, as earlier decentralization was considered synonymous with the separation of powers. Another scholar, Lê Tuấn Huy, also argued for a socialist form of decentralisation, believing it to be a state mechanism that could be used to safeguard against arbitrariness and lawlessness.

The current constitution of Vietnam declares it to be a "socialist state ruled by law and of the People, by the People and for the People." After a long national debate, a consensus has developed within Vietnam that "the rule of law state is not a type of state but a mode of organising the exercise of state power." A state type, from a Marxist–Leninist vantage point, is a state with a specific class character, such as socialist state, people's democratic state, and bourgeois state. A mode of organising means, in this instance, that it does not have a specific class character.

Trần Đình Hoan, a member of the 9th Politburo of the Communist Party of Vietnam (CPV), designated the rule of law as a "centralised manifestation of democracy". Nguyễn Duy Quý, a member of the 8th CPV Central Committee, and Nguyễn Tất Viễn, a legal scholar, therefore defined the rule of law as follows: "a mode of exercising power, a way of organising democracy, a way of organising the state and society on a democratic basis. That means that the rule of law is associated with a democracy, although not a type of state defined according to the theory of socio-economic form, but cannot appear in a society without democracy". As a result, the 13th National Congress of the CPV, held in 2021, emphasised the need to "more clearly define the roles, positions, functions, tasks, and powers of state organs in exercising legislative, executive, and judicial authority in accordance with the principles of the rule of law."

== See also ==
- Dictatorship of the proletariat
- Politburo
- Vanguardism
