= State of socialist orientation =

Third World countries which the USSR recognized as adhering to the ideas of socialism

In the political terminology of the former Soviet Union, the state of socialist orientation (Russian: Страны социалистической ориентации, romanized: Strany sotsialisticheskoy oriyentatsii, lit. 'countries of socialist orientation'), also called socialist-leaning state and socialist-oriented state, were the post-colonial Third World countries which the Soviet Union recognized as adhering to the ideas of socialism in the Marxist–Leninist understanding. As a result, these countries received significant economic and military support. In Soviet press, these states were also called "countries on the path of the construction of socialism" (Russian: страны, идущие по пути строительства социализма, romanized: strany, idushchiye po puti stroitel'stva sotsializma) and "countries on the path of the socialist development" (Russian: страны, стоящие на пути социалиcтического развития, romanized: strany, stoyashchiye na puti sotsialicticheskogo razvitiya). All these terms meant to draw a distinction from the true socialist states (in Marxist–Leninist understanding).

The use of the term was partly a result of a reassessment of national liberation movements in the Third World following World War II, widespread decolonization and the emergence of the Non-Aligned Movement as well as Nikita Khrushchev's Secret Speech to the 20th Congress of the Communist Party of the Soviet Union and the de-Stalinization of Soviet Marxism. The discussion of anti-colonial struggle at the 2nd World Congress of the Comintern in 1920 had been formulated in terms of a debate between those for an alliance with the anti-imperialist national bourgeoisie (initially advocated by Vladimir Lenin) and those for a pure class line of socialist, anti-feudal as well as anti-imperialist struggle (such as M. N. Roy). The revolutions of the post-war decolonization era (excepting those led by explicitly proletarian forces such as the Vietnamese Revolution), e.g. the rise of Nasserism, were initially seen by many communists as a new form of bourgeois nationalism and there were often sharp conflicts between communists and nationalists. However, the adoption of leftist economic programs (such as nationalization and/or land reform) by many of these movements and governments, as well as the international alliances between the revolutionary nationalists and the Soviet Union, obliged communists to reassess their nature. These movements were now seen as neither classical bourgeois nationalists nor socialist per se, but rather offering the possibility of "non-capitalist development" as a path of "transition to socialism". At various times, these states included Algeria, Angola, Egypt, Ethiopia, India, Libya, Mozambique, South Yemen and many others.

In Soviet political science, "socialist orientation" was defined to be an initial period of the development in countries which rejected capitalism, but did not yet have the prerequisites for the socialist revolution or development. Along these lines, a more cautious synonym was used, namely "countries on the path of non-capitalist development". A 1986 Soviet reference book on Africa claimed that about one-third of African states followed this path.

In some countries designated as socialist-leaning by the Soviet Union such as India, this formulation was sharply criticized by emerging Maoist or Chinese-leaning groups such as the Communist Party of India (Marxist), who considered the doctrine class collaborationist as part of the larger Sino-Soviet split and the Maoist struggle against so-called Soviet revisionism.

== List of socialist-leaning states ==
States that had communist governments States that the Soviet Union believed at one point to be moving toward socialism Other states allied with the Soviet Union at some point

Some of these countries had communist governments while others did not. The countries in bold text had a communist government.

- **Democratic Republic of Afghanistan** (1978–1991)
- Algeria (1962–1991)
- **People's Republic of Angola** (1975–1991)
- Bangladesh (1971–1975)
- **People's Republic of Benin** (1975–1990)
- Burma (1962–1988)
- Cape Verde (1975–1991)
- Chile (1970–1973)
- (Taiwan) Republic of China (1921–1927)
- **State of the Comoros** (1975–1978)
- Egypt (1952–1974)
- Equatorial Guinea (1968–1979)
- **(Ethiopia) Derg** (1974–1987)
  - **People's Democratic Republic of Ethiopia** (1987–1991)
- Ghana (1960–1966)
- **People's Revolutionary Government of Grenada** (1979–1983)
- Guinea Bissau (1973–1991)
- Guinea (1958–1991)
- Guyana (1966–1991)
- India (1947–1991)
- Indonesia (1959–1966)
- Iraq (1958–1963, 1968–1990)
- Israel (1948–1953)
- Jamaica (1972–1980)
- **Democratic Kampuchea** (1975–1979)
  - **People's Republic of Kampuchea** (1979–1989)
  - **State of Cambodia** (1989–1992)
- **Lao People's Democratic Republic** (1975–1991)
- Libya (1969–1991)
- **Democratic Republic of Madagascar** (1975–1991)
- Mali (1960–1991)
- Mauritania (1961–1984)
- **People's Republic of Mozambique** (1975–1990)
- Nicaragua (1979–1990)
- Palestine (1967–1991)
- **People's Republic of the Congo** (1969–1991)
- Peru (1968–1975)
- Sahrawi Arab Democratic Republic (1976–1991)
- Sao Tome and Principe (1975–1991)
- Seychelles (1977–1991)
- **(Somalia) Somali Democratic Republic** (1969–1977) (Note: At the outbreak of the Somali invasion of Ethiopia in 1977, the Soviet Union ceased to support Somalia, with the corresponding change in rhetoric. In turn, Somalia broke diplomatic relations with the Soviet Union and the United States adopted Somalia as a Cold War ally.)
- **South Yemen** (1967–1990)
- Sudan (1969–1985)
- Syria (1955–1961, 1963–1991)
- Tanzania (1964–1985)
- Turkey (1923–1930)
- Uganda (1969–1971)
- **Upper Volta** (1983–1984)
  - **Burkina Faso** (1984–1987)
- Zambia (1964–1991)
- Zimbabwe (1980–1991)

== See also ==
- African socialism
- Arab socialism
- Bureaucratic collectivism
- Communist state
- Congress of the Peoples of the East
- Developmentalism
- List of socialist states
- Marxism–Leninism
- New class
- Nomenklatura
- People's republic
- Politics of the Soviet Union
- Socialist state
- Soviet Bloc
- Soviet Empire
- State capitalism
- State socialism
