= Politics of East Germany =

The German Democratic Republic, commonly known in English as East Germany or the GDR, was a unitary communist state that existed from 7 October 1949 to 3 October 1990. Politics were dominated by the Socialist Unity Party of Germany (SED), which ruled the country for most of its existence. The Constitution of East Germany created a people's democratic state from 1949 until 1968, when a new communist state constitution formalised many of the communist state institutions and governing principles, including the unified state power system and the "leading role" of the SED.

Officially, under the 1949 constitution, East Germany was initially governed by a parliamentary system inspired by the Weimar Republic, with a bicameral legislature comprising the Volkskammer and Länderkammer, with a singular president as head of state and an executive organ called the "Government of the Republic". The Länderkammer was abolished in 1958, turning the Volkskammer into a unicameral legislature, and the presidency was replaced by a collective State Council in 1960.

With the adoption of a socialist constitution in 1968, the government was reorganized into a unified state power system modelled on the Soviet Union's: the Volkskammer was now designated as the supreme state organ of power with all state powers vested in it. The State Council became the Volkskammer's permanent organ, and the Government of the Republic was renamed Council of Ministers and christened as the supreme executive and administrative organ, and the Supreme Court as the supreme judicial organ.

De facto, regardless of formal constitutional structure, state organs worked under the leadership of the SED, and more specifically, the SED's Politburo; elections were held on a non-competitive basis, with the SED and its associated bloc parties running on a "unity list" with a pre-determined distribution of seats, and all political opposition was subjected to widespread repression.

The SED relinquished control during Die Wende in 1989/1990 and rebranded itself as the Party of Democratic Socialism (PDS) before the 1990 East German general election, the only free and competitive election in East Germany, winning 16% of the vote. East Germany ceased to exist following German reunification seven months later. The PDS eventually merged with the Electoral Alternative for Labor and Social Justice to form the modern Die Linke in 2007.

== Overview ==
=== Foundation ===
The German Democratic Republic (GDR or East Germany) was founded on 7 October 1949 with the promulgation of the 1949 Constitution. It was formed with the support of the Soviet Union from the Soviet Occupation Zone in Germany, in response to the founding of the Federal Republic of Germany (FRG or West Germany) in May. It was founded by the Socialist Unity Party of Germany (SED) which was created in 1946 through the forced merger of the Communist Party of Germany (KPD) and the Social Democratic Party of Germany (SPD) branch in the Soviet Zone. The SED was intended as an equal partnership but, with heavy Soviet influence, KPD members would soon come to dominate and it emerged as a Marxist-Leninist communist party modeled on the Communist Party of the Soviet Union. East Germany, as a satellite state of the Soviet Union, would undergo rapid Sovietization in mid-1950s, and it would become a member state of the Eastern Bloc and Warsaw Pact.

=== Constitution and political system ===
==== Official ====
According to the 1949 Constitution of East Germany, based on the liberal Weimar Constitution, it was a democratic republic with a parliamentary system of government with the Volkskammer as the legislature (and until 1958, also the Länderkammer as the legislative representation of the States) seated in East Berlin. The 1968 Constitution changed this to a socialist republican system based on unified state power, with the Volkskammer now serving as supreme state organ of power. In both of its incarnations, the composition of the Volkskammer was determined by general elections in East Germany held every four or five years. The SED won a majority with at least 98% voter turnout in every election, governing as the largest party of the National Front of Democratic Germany, a socialist parliamentary group. This included four other bloc parties:

1. Christian Democratic Union of Germany (CDU; Christlich-Demokratische Union Deutschlands) merged with the West German Christian Democratic Union after reunification
2. Democratic Farmers' Party of Germany (DBD; Demokratische Bauernpartei Deutschlands) merged with the West German Christian Democratic Union after reunification
3. Liberal Democratic Party of Germany (LDPD; Liberal-Demokratische Partei Deutschlands) merged with the West German Free Democratic Party after reunification
4. National Democratic Party of Germany (NDPD; Nationaldemokratische Partei Deutschlands) merged with the West German Free Democratic Party after reunification

Non-parliamentary mass organizations were included in the National Front which nevertheless played a key role in East German society, such as the German Gymnastics and Sports Association (Deutscher Turn- und Sportbund or DTSB), the People's Solidarity (Volkssolidarität, an organisation for the elderly), and the Society for German–Soviet Friendship. The Volkskammer also included representatives from the mass organisations like the Free German Youth (Freie Deutsche Jugend or FDJ), or the Free German Trade Union Federation. In an attempt to include women in the political life in East Germany, there was even a Democratic Women's Federation of Germany with seats in the Volkskammer.

==== Unofficial ====
The SED established a de facto political system modeled on the government of the Soviet Union: a Stalinist, one-party Marxist-Leninist communist state with itself as the vanguard party. All decisions, in practice, were made by the Politburo of the SED's Central Committee rather than the Volkskammer. The Central Committee and the Volkskammer served to rubber-stamp the Politburo's decisions, and the Council of Ministers was tasked with implementing them. The General Secretary/First Secretary of the SED was the most powerful position and the effective leader of the country. The political system in East Germany was totalitarian and authoritarian, particularly from the early 1950s, with any form of opposition or dissident activity being met with repression from the Ministry of State Security (Stasi).

Elections in East Germany were subject to open electoral fraud: voters only had the option of approving or rejecting a single "united list" of National Front candidates. There was no secret ballot and voters that rejected the National Front list, or struck candidates from the list, faced consequences from the state. The purpose of the National Front was to give the impression of a democracy governed by a broad-based coalition. In fact, all parties and mass organizations were subservient to the SED, and had to officially accept the SED's "leading role" as a condition of their existence. The other purpose was to catch parts of East German society that would ordinarily not be represented by the SED, a nominal workers party. For example, the CDU was directed to the large number Christians in the GDR, the NDPD at former Nazi Party members, and so on. The CDU and LDPD were formerly independent, while the NDPD and DBD were created on the instigation of the SED. All of these parties were subservient to the SED, which per the constitution was the ruling party, and had to espouse socialism. The number of SED members on the list were always the majority because many candidates of the National Front's mass organizations were also SED members.

On 9 April 1968, East Germany adopted a new, fully-communist constitution which formalised many of the de facto practices, including the "leading role" of the SED.

== State Apparatus ==
=== State Council ===
The State Council (Staatsrat der DDR), the collective head of state (and, since 1968, the permanent organ of the Volkskammer), was largely a creation of Walter Ulbricht during his tenure as First Secretary of the SED. After Ulbricht was forced to relinquish that position in 1971, the prestige and authority of the council correspondingly began to decline. However, although it was no longer the de facto supreme executive organ, Erich Honecker's assumption of the chairmanship of the Council of State in October 1976 represented a renewal of its importance. A similar move was made in the Soviet Union when Leonid Brezhnev became head of state. It is reasonable to assume that given East Germany's close adherence to Soviet practices, the increased invisibility of the Council of State since the late 1970s can be traced at least in part to parallel developments in the Soviet Union. Related to the takeover of the council's chairmanship by Honecker is the fact that after 1977 the number of individuals who were simultaneously members of the council and of the SED's Central Committee Secretariat increased.

In referring to the State Council, the amended 1949 Constitution declared that it consisted of the chairman, six deputy chairmen, sixteen members, and secretary; the 1968 Constitution made no mention of the number of deputy chairmen and members, allowing the number to vary: in 1987, under the chairmanship of Honecker, there were eight deputy chairmen and seventeen members. In addition to Honecker, two of the deputy chairmen, Horst Sindermann and Willi Stoph, were members of the Politburo of the SED. Stoph was also chairman of the Council of Ministers, and Sindermann was President of the Volkskammer. Four of the deputy chairmen of the State Council represented the other four political parties, as did four of its seventeen members. The day-to-day functions of the council were carried on by a staff consisting in 1987 of twenty offices and departments, all of which were headed by SED members. Despite the presence of non-SED members as deputy chairmen and members of the leadership group, SED control was guaranteed by the presence of Honecker, Stoph, Sindermann, and Egon Krenz, probably the four most powerful individuals in the country.

In the mid-1980s, the functions performed by the State Council included representing the country abroad and ratifying and terminating international treaties; supporting local assemblies in the implementation of their economic and budgetary plans; administering electoral laws that govern the selection of local assemblies on the community, city, county, and district levels; discharging responsibilities for the maintenance of the country's defense with the assistance of the National Defense Council; and administering the activities of the Supreme Court and the Office of the Prosecutor General to ensure their actions were congruent with the Constitution and the civil law. In this area, the State Council possessed additional responsibility for proclaiming amnesties and pardons.

=== Council of Ministers ===
The Council of Ministers (Ministerrat der DDR) was the government of East Germany and, since 1968, the supreme executive and administrative organ. Its position in the system of government and its functions and tasks were specified in the Constitution as amended in 1974, as well as in the "Law on the Council of Ministers of the German Democratic Republic" of October 1972. Whereas earlier the Council of Ministers had been described as the "executive organ of the People's Chamber," the 1972 statute defined the council as the "government." According to the new law, the Council of Ministers was to "carry out the decisions of the party of the working class on the basis of the laws and decisions of the People's Chamber." The Constitution (as amended in 1974) significantly expanded the functions of the Council of Ministers at the expense of the State Council.

In 1987, the Council of Ministers consisted of a chairman, two first deputy chairmen, and nine deputy chairmen, all of whom constituted an inner circle called the Presidium of the Council of Ministers. The chairman of the Council of Ministers, Willi Stoph, was head of the government as an equivalent to prime minister. Stoph, a representative of the "old guard" and a Politbüro member since 1953, was again appointed council chairman in 1986. Unlike the nine deputy chairmen, the two first deputy chairmen, Politbüro members Werner Krolikowski and Alfred Neumann, generally had not been responsible for specific ministerial portfolios. Four of the nine deputy chairmen represented the four non-SED political parties allowed to operate in East Germany: Rudolf Schulze of the CDU (Minister of Posts and Telecommunications), Hans Reichelt of the DBD (Minister of Environmental Protection and Water Management), Hans-Joachim Heusinger of the LDPD (Minister of justice), and Manfred Flegel of the NDPD (Chairman of the State Contract Court). The other five positions held by deputy chairman on the Presidium of the Council of Ministers were occupied by members of the Central Committee of the SED. Two of the appointees, Günther Kleiber and Gerhard Schürer, a candidate member, were also Politbüro members. Of the thirty-three regular members on the council, including both ministers and non-ministers, nineteen were concurrently members of the Central Committee of the SED, and two were also Politbüro members. The latter were Erich Mielke, the Minister of State Security, and Hans-Joachim Böhme, Minister of University and Technical Affairs.

According to the Constitution, all members of the Council of Ministers were formally elected to their posts by the Volkskammer for a five-year term. In fact, these decisions probably emanated from the Politbüro and the Central Committee of the SED. The Council of Ministers was required to work closely with the Volkskammer, and according to its administrative guidelines, the council was required to have all its legal drafts and decisions approved by the Volkskammer before they became law. In practice, the converse was true; the Volkskammer was obliged to approve those actions that were undertaken by the council, and then routinely submitted to the legislature. Similarly, the Volkskammer was given the formal responsibility of selecting the membership of the council; in practice such personnel decisions were made by the Politbüro. The legislature was then expected to approve the selections. The Council of Ministers was responsible for providing the Volkskammer with the major legal drafts and decisions that subsequently were to be promulgated by the parliament. The work style of the Council of Ministers was a collective one: it normally met on a weekly basis to discuss problems and plans put forward by individual ministers. It also confirmed decisions that were already made by the Presidium, which was of special importance because of its responsibility for handling the affairs of the council when the full body was not in session.

Specific functional responsibilities of the Council of Ministers included directing and planning the national economy; solving problems growing out of membership in the Council for Mutual Economic Assistance (COMECON — see Appendix B); coordinating and implementing social policy decisions that have been agreed upon with the support and concurrence of the Free German Trade Union Federation (Freier Deutscher Gewerkschaftsbund—FDGB); instructing and controlling subordinate levels of government, i.e., the councils at district, county, and community levels that implemented the laws and decisions of the central government; improving the functioning of the system of "democratic centralism" within the state apparatus; and carrying out the basic foreign policy principles of the socialist state.

=== Judiciary ===
East Germany's judiciary, like all other aspects of the government administration, was subject to the will of the SED as the ultimate decision maker in the operation of the legal system. The Constitution, however, provided for the right of citizens to a voice in the judicial process and the selection of judges, directly or through their elected representatives. It further provided for citizen participation in the administration of justice in an effort to deter crime. Basic guarantees for justice were said to derive from the "socialist society, the political power of the working people, and their state and legal system." In fact, separation of powers did not exist in the East German system of government, in favour of the Marxist-Leninist concept of unified power. Although the Constitution asserted the independence of the courts, it also subordinated the judiciary to the political authorities and their political goals. Even the superficially democratic 1949 Constitution subordinated the judiciary, along with all other government organs, to the Volkskammer. Judgeships were restricted to communists of proven loyalty, and the SED regime officially considered law and justice the tools for building a communist society, declaring it the duty of all judicial and legal officers to serve this end. In effect, legal and judicial organs served as agencies for promoting official SED doctrine, and the careers of personnel in the system were dependent on their political ratings as determined by higher state and party officials.

The Ministry of Justice, the Supreme Court, and the Office of the Prosecutor General sat at the top of East Germany's legal system. In 1987, the heads of these offices were, respectively, Hans-Joachim Heusinger (LDPD), Heinrich Toeplitz (CDU), and Josef Streit (SED). The Prosecutor General appointed prosecutors throughout East Germany, including those active in military courts; he could dismiss them, and they were "responsible to him and bound by his instructions." The Office of the Prosecutor General was also responsible for supervising "strict adherence to socialist legality and protecting citizens from violations of the law." The role of the Ministry of Justice, which was not mentioned in the Constitution, appeared to be largely formal and propagandistic. The organs of justice were the Supreme Court, regional courts, district courts, and social courts. Military jurisdiction was exercised by the Supreme Court and military tribunals and courts. The specific areas of responsibility for each level of the court system are defined by law. Professional and lay judges of the courts are elected for five years by corresponding representative bodies, except district court judges, who were elected directly by the citizenry. They were subject to dismissal for malfeasance and for violations of law and the Constitution in the performance of their duties.

Under the Constitution, the Supreme Court, as the highest organ of the legal system, directed the jurisdiction of all lower courts and was charged with ensuring the uniform application of the law on all levels. The highest court not only had the right of extraordinary appeal as a measure of control over the lower courts, but on occasion serves as a link in the chain of command by issuing general legal directives. According to Article 93 of the Constitution, the Supreme Court "directs the jurisdiction of the courts on the basis of the Constitution, the laws, and their statutory regulations. . . . It ensures a uniform application of the law by all courts." The directive function of the Supreme Court went far beyond that of supreme courts in Western systems, which as a rule do not give legally binding instructions to the lower courts concerning specific questions of law. The Supreme Court was responsible to the Volkskammer and, between the latter's sessions, to the Council of State. Internally, the organization of the high court consisted of an assembly, a presidium, and three functional administrative divisions known as "collegiums" for criminal justice, military justice, and civil, family, and labor law. The assembly, which was directed in its plenary sessions by the Supreme Court Presidium, consisted of fifteen directors of the district courts, the chairmen of the higher military courts, and all professional judges. Each district court was presided over by a professional judge and two jurors in cases of original jurisdiction, and by three professional judges in cases of appellate jurisdiction. The district courts had appellate jurisdiction in civil cases and original jurisdiction in major criminal cases such as economic crimes, murder, and crimes against the state.

County court was the lowest level of the judiciary system, and each of the country's counties had at least one such court, which was presided over by a professional judge and two lay judges. The majority of all criminal and civil cases were tried at this level; county courts had jurisdiction over cases not assigned elsewhere and civil cases involving only small amounts of property.

In addition to the regular law courts, East Germany also developed an extensive system of community and social courts (gesellschaftliche Gerichte), known also as "conflict or arbitration commissions" (Konflikt-und Schiedskommissionen). The first were formed in state-owned and private enterprises, health and educational institutions, offices, and social organizations. The second were established in residential areas, collective farms, and cooperatives of manual laborers, fishermen, and gardeners. Created to relieve the regular courts of their minor civil or criminal case loads, the jurisdiction of the courts applied to labor disputes, minor breaches of the peace, misdemeanors, infringements of the law, truancy, and conflicts in civil law. These courts were composed of lay jurors elected by their respective constituencies. SED officials at the community level generally influenced the nomination of jurors to the community courts and exercised considerable influence on the outcome of cases heard at this level.

=== Politicians of note in East Germany ===
Leaders and their key positions - see also Leaders of East Germany

- Hermann Axen, Editor-in-chief of Neues Deutschland (1956–1966)
- Johannes R. Becher, Minister of Culture (1954–1958); President of the Cultural Association of the GDR (1945–1958); President of the Academy of Arts of the GDR (1953–1956)
- Hilde Benjamin, Minister of Justice (1953–1967)
- Otto Grotewohl, Chairman of the SED jointly with Pieck (1946–1950); Chairman of the Council of Ministers (1949–1964)
- Gregor Gysi, last leader of the SED (1989–1990)
- Erich Honecker, General Secretary of the SED (1971–1989); Chairman of the Council of State (1976–1989)
- Egon Krenz, General Secretary of the SED (1989); Chairman of the Council of State (1989)
- Wilhelm Külz, Leader of the Liberal Democratic Party (1945–1948)
- Lothar de Maizière, Minister-President of the GDR, the first (and only) non-socialist head of government (1990); Minister for Foreign Affairs (1990)
- Erich Mielke, Minister of State Security (1957–1989)
- Günter Mittag, Secretary for the Economy (1962–1973 and 1976–1989)
- Hans Modrow, last socialist head of government
- Wilhelm Pieck, Chairman of the SED jointly with Grotewohl (1946–1950); President of the German Democratic Republic (1949–1960)
- Heinrich Rau, Chairman of the German Economic Commission, the predecessor of the East German government (1948-1949)
- Günter Schabowski, SED government spokesman famous for his role in the fall of the Berlin Wall
- Willi Stoph, Chairman of the Council of Ministers (1964–1973 and 1976–1989); Chairman of the Council of State (1973–1976)
- Harry Tisch, Chairman of the Free German Trade Union Federation (1975–1989)
- Walter Ulbricht, General Secretary of the SED (1950–1971); Chairman of the Council of State (1960–1973)

== See also ==
- History of the German Democratic Republic
- Communist state
- Leaders of East Germany
- National Front (East Germany)
- Soviet Military Administration in Germany
- Constitution of East Germany
- German Economic Commission
- German People's Congress
- German People's Council
- People's Control Commission
- People's Chamber
- List of Volkskammer members (9th election period)
- New states of Germany

== Sources ==
- Library of Congress
