= Communist state constitution =

Constitutions of the communist world

A communist state constitution is the supreme and fundamental law of a communist state. In Marxist–Leninist theory, a constitution is understood both as a juridical act that establishes the structure of the state and its legal order, and as the formal expression of the prevailing class system controlled by the ruling class. Communist constitutions codify the political and economic programme of the ruling communist party by stipulating its leading role in state and society and are considered to hold supreme legal force, providing the foundation for all legislation and state activity. Unlike liberal constitutional systems, communist state constitutions reject the separation of powers and judicial review. Instead, they posit that popular sovereignty emanates from the people and is bestowed on state leaders undiluted vertically from bottom to top through a pyramid-like structured unified state apparatus emanating from a system of state organs of power headed by a supreme state organ of power (SSOP) at its apex. This structure enables democratic centralism by informing the power relationship between state organs, and turns the highest organs into superior organs and creates a system in which policies adopted by higher-level organs must be implemented downward by inferior state organs. This entails the institution of dual subordination, meaning both vertical accountability from bottom to top in the form of electoral recall and top to bottom in the form of binding character of decisions made by superior organs, and horizontal accountability in the form of inferior state organs being held accountable to state organ of power at the corresponding level. The constitution defines this structure and the functioning of the inferior state organs as an act of the SSOP's self-organisation in accordance with the division of labour of state organs, not as an imposition upon it.

Communist constitutions share a broadly similar structure: a preamble outlining ideological goals; chapters on the political and economic system, often emphasising the leading role of the party, providing a normative framework for the transition to a communist society, public ownership and planned economic development; sections defining the organisation of state power, including the SSOP, its permanent organ, the supreme executive and administrative organ, the supreme judicial organ, the supreme procuratorial organ, and other state organs if needed; and chapters detailing citizens' rights and obligations. Rights are paired with corresponding obligations, reflecting the view that rights are not natural entitlements but contingent upon fulfilling social obligations. Legal systems operate under the principle of socialist law, which requires state organs, transmission belt mass organisations, and citizens to observe the constitution and laws. The procuracy typically supervises legality; constitutional enforcement is ordinarily vested in the SSOP or its permanent organ (with occasional specialised committees or courts).

While the basic framework is similar, communist constitutions vary across time and place. Some states introduced distinctive institutions, such as constitutional courts in Yugoslavia and Czechoslovakia or supervisory commissions in China, while others retained the classic Soviet model centred on the SSOP. Draft constitutions were often circulated for mass discussion before adoption, and constitutional amendments were generally reserved to the SSOP.

== Theoretical framework ==
In Marxist–Leninist usage, "constitution" carries two distinct meanings. First, it denotes a de facto juridical act—the supreme and fundamental law regulating social relations, underpinning the social and state order, and defining the individual's role. Second, it signifies the de jure factual basis of the existing order, namely how a country's socio-economic and political system actually operates. From this perspective, constitutions in the first sense have existed since the emergence of the state, whereas de jure constitutions first appeared with the American and French revolutions. Communist constitutions are treated by Marxist–Leninists as de jure constitutions.

Communist constitutions are typically said to have two defining features: first, they are the supreme law of the state; second, they codify the communist party's policy programme into state policy. In Marxist–Leninist theory, the constitution is regarded as a legal act that can be distinguished from other laws and legislation in terms of its legal force. Another juridical act of greater legal force determines the legal force of a juridical act. Since the constitution holds supreme legal power, a communist constitution does not require regulation by a superior law. The legal basis for this assertion is that these constitutions serve as the supreme law of the land. Meaning that they establish the fundamental principles of legislation and the legal system. Legislation must adhere completely to the constitution. In the event of any discrepancies, the constitution takes priority over legislative acts. Should any legislative acts be enacted that conflict with the constitution, they will be rendered legally void. This principle also extends to international relations: a communist state cannot enter into an international treaty that contravenes the constitution.

The constitution derives its authority from its adoption by the supreme state organ of power (SSOP), which is considered the embodiment of popular sovereignty since unified power rests on the assumption that the SSOP's state power is based on, according to scholar John N. Hazard, "the supreme expression of the will of the people and beyond the reach of judicial restraint". This also entails, according to Otto Bihari, that since the SSOP is the embodiment of popular sovereignty, it cannot be constrained by the constitution. In Marxist–Leninist theory, this is taken to mean that judicial review is inadmissible since it is interpreted to mean that an external state institution stands above the SSOP. However, the communist state seeks to safeguard the constitution per the principle of socialist law, understood as the duty of the party, state organs, social organisations and citizens to observe the constitution. In practice, constitutional oversight rests on political supervision by the SSOP, procuratorial control by the supreme and subordinate procuracies, and electoral accountability through non-competitive elections.

According to scholar Georg Brunner, this indicates that communist constitutions codify the state's unlimited political powers, and indirectly, those of the communist party. He believes this is proof that the liberal democratic conception of the rule of law is irreconcilable with communist constitutionalism because they rest on opposing relationships between law and politics. Under the liberal democratic rule of law conception, political processes are constrained by legal norms supervised by an independent judiciary and are viewed as universal and non-ideological. That means that holders of political power are bound by law, and that law takes precedence over politics. By contrast, communist constitutions codify the primacy of politics over judicial authority, as judicial power is also considered a form of political power. That means that communist states formally subjugate judicial power to political power (the supreme judicial organ is inferior and accountable to the SSOP). Marxist–Leninists hold that legislation, not judicial rulings, is the sole source of valid law. As a result, Marxism–Leninism rejects the separation of powers, but supports the demarcation of state responsibilities in accordance with the principle of the division of labour. Other state organs derive their powers from, and are subordinated to, the SSOP.

From a Marxist−Leninist perspective, unlimited political power is held to be righteous since it is imbued with Marxism–Leninism, which is another difference with liberal constitutionalism. Liberal democratic constitutions are written in a way to not directly tie to a specific ideology, according to United States Supreme Court judge Oliver Wendell Holmes. Because of this, Brunner argues that communist states are not rule of law states, but "rule of politics states". As the perceived vanguard of the working class, the party, through socialist law, controls the legal system based on the thesis of the strict observance of laws and the application of law in conformity with the political requirements outlined by them. In this sense, the communist constitutions oppose the liberal concept of limited government since it seeks to limit state power in a bid to prevent the abuse of power. Communist states seek to regulate state power by getting officials to abide by law, but do not try to limit the state's actual powers.

"Soviet law has the attribute not only of consolidating already established relationships, but also of pushing, provoking, and at least of aiding the attainment of such relationships which society legislatively and consciously aspires to establish. Only within this context can we see the essence of the creative role of legislation."

— Mikhail Kalinin, the long-standing chairman of the Presidium of the Supreme Soviet of the Soviet Union, on how laws reflect material changes.

Marxism–Leninism holds that the material base, encompassing the economy and nature, shapes the superstructure, which includes the socio-political system and human culture. Marxism holds that the state and laws it issues are a tool of the ruling class that uses them for its own material interests, and Vladimir Lenin reconfirmed this thesis after gaining power. In communist states, this means that the proletarian communist party wields state power to suppress class enemies and construct socialism. In the early years of Soviet rule, there was debate over whether law would ultimately wither away with the state or remain a tool of the new state. Soviet jurist Andrey Vyshinsky resolved the issue by insisting that law persisted under socialism as an instrument of the proletarian state. Constitutions, therefore, codify the prevailing class order and the political aspirations of the ruling class of the communist state.

As a result, Marxist–Leninists insist that each constitution has a class character: it reflects the prevailing state type, which in turn arises from the existing mode of production, and thus expresses the interests of the ruling class. By adopting a constitution, a state formalises the rule of one class over others. For example, in the slave-owning mode of production, constitutions were formulated in a bid to safeguard the interests of slave-owners. From this perspective, constitutions are altered to reflect changes in the ruling class and material conditions. There is, however, a possibility that the ruling class may decide to amend or adopt a new constitution to reflect material changes, as is frequently done by the communist state ruling class. In most societies, a constitution is affected when one ruling class is replaced or the balance of class forces shifts.

It is commonly understood by Marxist–Leninists that a constitution is a fundamental law establishing the underlying principles and forms of a state's social and state structure. It defines the legal status of citizens and the system of state organs that serve the interests of the ruling class. Marxist–Leninist authors contend that bourgeois theoreticians attribute a decisive role to constitutions in determining a country's social and state system. They reject this proposition, arguing that a constitution cannot in itself create a new social order. They accept, however, that a constitution may alter the form of government—for example, a transition from a parliamentary republic to a presidential republic, as Pakistan in its 1973 constitution—and may reorganise relations among state units, as with the 1979 Nigerian constitution.

The life expectancy of a constitution adopted by a communist state is, according to scholar Christopher Osakwe, "very short in comparison to that of its western counterpart, and each new constitution seeks to consolidate past gains as well as lay out the paths for future growth and thus serves as an effective link between the past, present, and future." Meaning that Marxist–Leninists do not believe the constitution institutes radical change by its own force; rather, it records change already effected through a revolution or counter-revolution as a result of changes in the balance of class forces in a given society. For example, according to Soviet theoretician Veniamin Chirkin, the post-1966 coup d'état constitution of Ghana simply registered the shift that had occurred after the removal of Kwame Nkrumah when the country had been characterised as a state of socialist orientation. Joseph Stalin, a Soviet leader, when reporting on the 1936 Soviet constitution to the SSOP, stressed its function as a recorder: "This draft constitution sums up the distance we have travelled, summarising the achievements already made. In other words, it records and legalises achievements already made and successes actually won."

In communist states, a significant relationship exists between the communist constitution and the communist party programme. The party programme provides the theoretical framework and policy line; the constitution is a legislative instrument that codifies existing political and economic structures and states broad goals derived from the programme. Lenin encapsulated the linkage—"Here is our policy, and you shall find it in our constitution"—but the distinction remains: the programme analyses and prescribes; the constitution formulates binding norms and institutional arrangements.

Communist constitutions represent a normative expression of the fundamental principles outlined in the party's programme. A constitutional provision that establishes the political aim of the state as the construction of socialism or communism is declarative. Nonetheless, it also possesses a normative quality, as it encourages all state, social, and party organisations, as well as officials and individual citizens, to align their actions with this objective. Any deviation from this goal will be regarded as a sanctionable offence by the state for those who violate this standard. This is why communist constitutions often have explicit language defending against their purported enemies. Thus, the 1949 Hungarian constitution empowered courts to defend the people's democratic state against "enemies of the working people", whereas the 1947 Bulgarian constitution used more general language penalising organisations seeking to curtail rights that the communists instituted after seizing power. Academic John N. Hazard cautions that the Hungarian formulation was exceptional; more often, the language was less explicit, as shown by the Bulgarian constitution.

== Structure and provisions ==
With a few exceptions, such as the 1975 Chinese constitution and the 1974 Yugoslav constitution, most communist constitutions follow the same text structure formed by the world's first communist constitution in 1918, which was restructured with the 1936 Soviet constitution. These constitutions usually start with a preamble, and codify general principles of the political system, economic system, social system, to individual rights and obligations and the system of state organs. In regard to the system of state organs, the communist constitutions were comprehensive—addressing the SSOP and lower-level state organs of power, the supreme executive and administrative organ, the supreme judicial organ, the supreme procuratorial organ, other state organs and electoral systems—but formulating specialised laws for all these organs to explain their status more in-depth This "bird's-eye" approach distinguishes them from liberal constitutions, which are narrower and more detailed. Marxist–Leninist counter that this approach makes their constitutions "genuine".

=== Preamble ===
Constitutional preambles are, according to academic Osakwe, highly "declarative", containing often "vague and overly broad declarations of principles, sometimes not even of legal principles." The intention was to surmise the spirit of the constitution. The world's first communist constitution—the 1918 Constitution of Soviet Russia—illustrates this, defining the transitional task as establishing the dictatorship of the urban and rural proletariat and the poorest peasantry, to be exercised through the SSOP. The SSOP was to suppress the bourgeoisie, abolish exploitation and introduce communist mode of production, which was defined as entailing a classless society and the withering away of the state. Later communist constitutions generally avoided invoking the state's eventual withering away, focusing instead on the construction and development of socialism. The 1949 Hungarian constitution was explicit: its preamble cast people's democracy as the road to the socialist mode of production, presented the constitution as codifying achieved socio-economic changes, and set the course for further advance. As for length, the size of the preambles varies from state to state. For example, the preambles of the 1954 Chinese, 1959 North Vietnamese, and 1963 Yugoslav constitutions were lengthy. In contrast, the preambles of the 1949 Hungarian and 1965 Romanian constitutions were short.

Some constitutions outlined specific institutional principles in the preamble. For example, the 1961 Mongolian constitution says at the very end of its preamble the following: "In the Mongolian People's Republic, the guiding and directing force of society and of the state is the Mongolian People's Revolutionary Party, which is guided in its activities by the all-conquering theory of Marxism−Leninism." The 1975 Chinese constitution did the same, stating, "We must adhere to the basic line and policies of the Communist Party of China for the entire historical period of socialism and persist in continued revolution under the dictatorship of the proletariat so that our great motherland will always advance along the road indicated by Marxism−Leninism−Mao Zedong Thought."

According to Osakwe, "Almost all of the preambles proclaim the irreversible victory over capitalism in their societies." The Chinese constitution proclaims a victory over "imperialism, feudalism, and bureaucratic-capitalism." On the other hand, the 1961 Mongolian constitution affirmed the state's victory over imperialist colonialism and feudalism. Commonly, these statements are followed by the state's commitment to the construction of socialism and communism. For example, the 1971 Bulgarian constitution states, "We, the citizens of Bulgaria, operating on the victory of socialism, are fully resolved to construct, under the leadership of the Bulgarian Communist Party (BCP) and based on the implementation of its programmes, a full-fledged socialist society". This proclamation was further explained in the BCP programme, which defined a full-fledged socialist society as "the highest and most advanced stage in the development of socialism as the first stage of the communist formation."

=== Political system ===
Marxism–Leninism has a distinct understanding of the term political system from that of liberalism. From this perspective, the political system of a state is indelibly connected to the mode of production in question. For example, suppose the mode of production is socialist. In that case, Marxist-Leninists speak of the "Political system of socialism". If it's bourgeois, Marxist−Leninists speak of the "Political system of capitalism" or the "Bourgeois political system". Soviet theorist Veniamin Chirkin argued that the political system is broader in scope than the political structure. In its widest sense, it encompasses the totality of political life—its elements and aspects—including classes, nations, and individuals. Used more narrowly, it may denote the ensemble of state and public institutions through which political power is exercised.

The political system, in Marxist–Leninist usage, is commonly defined as the mode of organising a class society. It comprises institutional (organisational), normative (political-norm), functional (regime) and ideological (doctrinal) components, all linked by political relations. On this view, the political system regulates the production and distribution of social benefits by implementing state power, enabling participation in that power, and structuring the struggle for it. It functions as a system of management and control vis-à-vis class society, while simultaneously forming an integral part of that society. The chapter devoted to the political system comes after the constitutional preamble, and commonly introduces the ruling class and the state's class character, state type, state form, unified power, democratic centralism, the SSOP, the leading role of the party and transmission belt mass organisations.

Marxist–Leninists view the term dictatorship as value-neutral, unlike in liberalism. Their conception of dictatorship is directly tied to their understanding of democracy. Chirkin holds that "The dictatorship of a class is the political expression of its economic dominance", but notes that this dominance can take a non-democratic and democratic form. The selection of a particular method for exercising power by the dominant class is influenced by several key factors, according to Chirkin, including the extent of its social base and the intensity of the class struggle. Chirkin maintains that class dictatorship employs economic, political and ideological tools, but is driven chiefly by political power. Parties and mass organisations contribute to this, yet the state is central, enforcing class dictatorship through coercion with law as a primary instrument.

A specific form of class dictatorship leads to a specific state type, based on a specific mode of production that produces a specific ruling class. This class relations give the state a unique class character, which it uses to defend and develop a state type. Examples of state types are the feudal state, the bourgeois state, and the socialist state. There also exist communist state formations that try to transition the society they control from the capitalist mode of production to socialism, such as the people's democratic state, national democratic state and states of socialist orientation, or are a product of developed socialism, such as the socialist state of the whole people.

Stipulations on the state's class character and the state type are usually found early in political system chapters. For example, in the Chinese constitution, it is mentioned in the first article: "the People's Republic of China is a socialist state governed by a people's democratic dictatorship that is led by the working class and based on an alliance of workers and peasants." The 1977 Soviet constitution affirmed that the Soviet Union had evolved from a dictatorship of the proletariat into one of the whole people, "The Union of Soviet Socialist Republics is a socialist state of the whole people, expressing the will and interests of the workers, peasants and intelligentsia". Similar stipulations are found in all communist state constitutions.

Communist constitutions seek to define the state form. This term holds that the essence, content, and functions of the state define the nature of state power, while the state form reveals how that power is organised. The state form serves as its outward structure, shaped by its content. It is commonly understood to consist of three key elements: the form of government (whether republican or monarchical), the state structure (be it unitary or federal), and the state regime associated with the state form (bourgeois democracy and socialist democracy are two examples).

All communist constitutions have established a republic. The core philosophy presented here is that a monarchical form of government is fundamentally incompatible with the principles of egalitarianism inherent in communism. Consequently, a communist state must adopt a republican form of government led by the proletariat, opposed to the divine rights or inherited privileges of any particular family or traditional group. As a result, the term republic is prominently featured in communist constitutions. Most communist states that have existed have been unitary states. Still, there have been four exceptions to this rule: Czechoslovakia from 1968 until 1990, the Russian Socialist Federative Soviet Republic from 1917 to 1922, the Soviet Union and the Yugoslavia.

The state regime is directly tied to the SSOP. The 1977 Soviet constitution and the present-day Chinese constitution outlined unified power as the state regime: the Soviet constitution refers to the single system of Soviets as the organs of state power, while the Chinese document outlines the system of people's congress under the party's leadership. The Soviet constitution states that "All power in the U.S.S.R. belongs to the people", and the Chinese constitution identically states this, "All power in the People's Republic of China belongs to the people". And the people do so, the communist constitutions invariably state, through the system of state organs of power headed by the SSOP.

Another term, closely related to unified power and tied to the state regime, is democratic centralism. Democratic centralism is defined as the election of higher organs by lower organs, majority rule, and minority to majority decisions. It also calls for dual subordination, that is, vertical accountability from bottom to top through elections and top to bottom by making lower organs accountable to higher organs, and horizontal accountability by making inferior state organs responsible to the state organ of power at the corresponding level of governance. For example, all Chinese constitutions have included the term since the first communist constitution in 1954. It was also included in the Soviet constitutions of 1936 and 1977, and is a common feature of all communist constitutions. It normally stipulates, as in China, that all state organs have to implement democratic centralism. This principle is also a party principle. For example, the constitution of the Chinese Communist Party states that it is "the organisational principle of the party".

The constitutional principle of the leading role of the party first came into being in the 1936 Soviet constitution as the core of state power. This communist constitution was the first to outline the communist party's role in governance. It was mentioned once, in Article 126 in the chapter on the fundamental rights and obligations of Soviet citizens. That article holds that the most active and politically conscious citizens of the working class, the working peasantry and the working intelligentsia voluntarily unite in the Communist Party of the Soviet Union, which is described as the vanguard of the working people in building communism and as the leading core of all organisations of working people, both state and non-state organisations. This was copied more or less verbatim by Mongolia in their 1940 constitution.

The first constitutions of the European people's democratic states did not mention, or only indirectly mentioned, the communist party's monopoly on state power. However, by the 1960s, a clear trend emerged, making the communist party's hold on state power more explicit. For example, the 1960 Czechoslovak constitution stated, "The guiding force in society and in the State is the vanguard of the working class, the Communist Party of Czechoslovakia". In their 1963 constitution, Yugoslavia's rulers codified the League of Communists of Yugoslavia's monopoly of state power in the preamble. This constitution was the first to use the designation, leading role of the communist party, in the constitution. Despite holding a monopoly on state power, the communist constitution states that even the party must abide by the constitution. The 1977 Soviet constitution, for example, says, "All Party organisations shall function within the framework of the Constitution of the U.S.S.R."

Communist constitutions also devoted a lot of attention to transmission belt mass organisations. For example, Article 6 of the 1960 Czechoslovak constitution codified the National Front of the Czechs and the Slovaks, stating it was based on "the alliance of working people of towns and the countryside" and that it worked under the leadership of the Czechoslovak communist party. The non-communist parties that could participate in state affairs, but not govern, were members of this front and, according to the constitution, "recognise the programme and the leading role of the Communist Party of Czechoslovakia."

=== Economic system ===
In Marxist–Leninist usage, an economic system denotes the totality of relations of production, distribution, exchange and consumption of material goods across successive modes of production. Each economic system has a specific pattern of property ownership of the means of production at its basis. Marxist–Leninist theory distinguishes public property (owned by society as a whole via the state, or by co-operatives and other collectives) from private property (by individuals or by the dominant classes); under capitalism, it holds, even state property functions as the joint property of the bourgeois. In practice, multiple forms of ownership coexist in any state—especially in states transitioning from one mode of production to another. The dominant form constitutes the foundation of the economic system that shapes state power. Alongside ownership of the means of production, individuals are also recognised to have personal property. in communist state constitutions.

Coordination, aims, labour relations and distribution are treated as formation-specific. Historically, capitalism was characterised as being a market economy in which enterprise management occurs within a generally unplanned system, while a socialist economy was premised on a planned economy. Marxist–Leninist writers contend that capitalism orients production for profit, thereby reproducing class struggle, whereas the socialist mode of production orients production to maximising satisfaction of the population's material and spiritual needs. Labour under capitalism is portrayed as exploited labour generating surplus value, while under socialism, it is framed as free from exploitation. Distribution is said to follow the logic of private property under capitalism, and the principle "from each according to his ability, to each according to his work" under socialism, with the state regulating the measure of work and consumption.

Communist constitutions, unlike liberal democratic constitutions, normally have a chapter devoted to the economic system. For example, the 1971 Bulgarian constitution's second chapter was titled "Socio-Economic System", while the 1977 Soviet constitution's second chapter was named "The Economic System". These codify the socialist economy. For example, the 1960 Czechoslovak constitution echoed the 1936 Soviet constitution in proclaiming that the socialist economic system was the state's "economic foundation". Several communist states constitutionalised planning, with the 1949 Hungarian constitution and 1968 East German constitution being examples of that. State planning is still codified in the constitutions of Cuba and North Korea, while China does not, but is currently drafting the "National Development Planning Law" so that economic planning still has legal force.

The present-day Chinese constitution had, until its amendment in 1993, a stipulation that stated it practised a "planned economy on the basis of socialist public ownership". The stipulation on socialist public property remains, but the term planned economy has been replaced with the term socialist market economy. In 1999, the constitution was amended yet again to reaffirm the socialist nature of China's economy: "The foundation of the socialist economic system of the People's Republic of China is socialist public ownership of the means of production". The 1960 Czechoslovak stipulation also had a similar stipulation on property, defining socialist property as having "two basic forms: state property, which is the property of all people (national ownership), and co-operative property (ownership of people's co-operatives)." However, unlike the traditional communist constitution, the 1999 Chinese amendment also recognised private property for the first time: "The state shall protect the lawful rights and interests of non-public economic sectors such as individually owned and private businesses." A 2004 amendment made citizens' private property inviolable: "Citizens’ lawful private property is inviolable. The State, in accordance with law, protects the rights of citizens to private property and to its inheritance."

Historically, all communist states recognised personal property. According to Osakwe, this was an "effort to dispel the beliefs held by foreign 'enemies of socialism' that socialism does not respect the right of personal property." For example, the 1965 Romanian constitution states in Article 36, "The right to personal property is protected by law. Objects of the right to personal property can be income or savings derived from work, the dwelling house, the household around it, and the land on which they stand, as well as the goods of personal use and comfort." The difference between personal and private property is that of use. If an individual used his car solely for personal transport, it was considered personal property, but once it was used to generate profit, it was deemed private property.

=== Individual rights and obligations ===
Marxist–Leninist theory treats the all-round development of the individual as the central aim of the communist state; the 1977 Soviet constitution, for example, proclaimed: "The free development of each is the condition of the free development of all." It holds that communism abolishes exploitation and harmful inequality, overcomes alienation, and expands productive, political and creative activity for the common good. Rights, duties, and law are framed accordingly: rights enable participation and development, and socialist law makes the constitution and laws binding on the party, state organs, transmission belt organisations and citizens, providing the lawful protection of rights. In this account, rights are especially emphasised in their economic dimension and are held to be inseparable from the economic base—on this view, rights cannot be granted or realised independently of it—while societal obligations flow from collective goals. Law is not treated by Marxist−Leninists as declarative but as an instrument to safeguard constitutional rights and to enforce duties (for example, observance of the constitution and protection of public property), with due process guarantees regulating state coercion. Freedom is thus paired with responsibility: individual claims are recognised within, and limited by, the requirements of communist society. As such, all communist constitutions have chapters devoted to the fundamental rights and obligations of citizens.

"It is the duty of every citizen of the Mongolian People's Republic to devote all his efforts and knowledge to the building of socialism, remembering that honest and conscientious work for the benefit of society is the source of the increasing wealth and might of the socialist state and of the living standard of the workers."

— Article 89 of the 1960 Mongolian constitution. This article outlines the obligation of every citizen of communist states to partake in the construction of communism.

Citizens' rights and freedoms are inseparable from corresponding obligations in communist constitutions. Individuals are said to enjoy political rights on an equal footing, and they are obliged to assume responsibility for their own interests and the common good. Marxist–Leninist authors argue that natural entitlements and universal values are ideological constructs rather than objective norms inherent to human beings. In communist states, human rights are considered to have a class character and are granted to citizens by a state's ruling class contingent on their fulfilling their social obligations. In Marxist–Leninist doctrine, laws—presented as the will of the working people—protect and expand rights for those who discharge their obligations; non-fulfilment is held to weaken such claims. An example is the stipulation in the 1936 Soviet constitution that stated, "He who does not work, neither shall he eat", which held that Soviet citizens could not lay claim to constitutional rights without participating in society. Yuri Andropov, a general secretary of the CPSU Central Committee, argued that the democratic system of communist states has a class character and is a democracy specifically for workers. He argued that citizens enjoy broad freedoms when their interests align with those of society, but that collective interests take precedence when they do not. Andropov concluded that participation in governing, therefore, carries obligations, including strict discipline and responsibility to maintain labour and state order. The governing principle of balancing individual rights and society's collective interests is referred to as the unity between the interests of society and those of the individual citizens.

Communist constitutions typically place the right to work prominently and link it to the duty to work. Traditionally, these states did not recognise that unemployment existed within their borders. Instead, the constitution made formal stipulations on how the state would provide employment suited to ability and remunerate according to the quantity and quality of work. References to unemployment could be found indirectly, as in the 1968 East German constitution provision on employment, "Whenever suitable work cannot be found for him, he shall be provided necessary sustenance." Associated guarantees include the right to rest and leisure (limits on working time, weekly days off, public holidays, paid annual leave, and access to organised facilities). These constitutions also commonly provide rights to material provision in old age, sickness, disability, and for survivors, often through a unified, state-financed social security system. In some communist states, co-operatives and workers contribute, especially for rural schemes.

These constitutions commonly guarantee universal, compulsory and free schooling within a single state system (traditionally no private schools), with adult literacy programmes where relevant. Higher education is generally tuition-free, with grants for many students. For instance, the 1968 East Constitution stated that "every citizen has an equal right to education and to a free choice of his vocation". A right to health protection is typically grounded in these systems, and is supposed to be ensured through free medical services and preventive public-health measures. Several constitutions also recognise a right to housing, implemented through low-rent public accommodation, support for co-operative/individual construction, and publicly supervised allocation.

"The setting up of and participation in associations, the aims or activities of which are directed against the political or social system or against the legal order of the Polish People's Republic is forbidden."

— Article 72 of the 1952 Polish constitution. This article outlines that organisations that oppose the communist state order are forbidden.

Equality before the law is stressed in all communist constitutions. In regard to gender equality, all state that communism is incompatible with gender discrimination. For example, the 1975 Chinese constitution proclaims that "women enjoy equal rights with men in all respects." The 1936 Soviet constitution had a similar provision, "Women in the U.S.S.R. are accorded all rights on an equal footing with men in all spheres of economic, governmental, cultural, political, and other social activity." Racial discrimination was also expressly forbidden, especially in the constitution of multi-ethnic communist states. Article 41 of the 1963 Yugoslav constitution made clear "[t]he dissemination or pursuance of national inequality, as well as all incitement to national, racial, and religious hatred or intolerance is unconstitutional and shall be punished."

Political rights are framed around participation in the management of state and social affairs, complemented by electoral rights and freedoms of speech, association, press, assembly, and demonstration. Constitutions often guarantee access by transmission belt mass organisations to media and facilities, while prohibiting organisations whose aims are deemed anti-communist or directed against the constitutional order. Many texts entrench the right to submit proposals and complaints to state organs and transmission belt organisations, provide time-bound procedures for consideration, protect complainants from retaliation, and, in some cases, allow legal action against officials who violate the law. Other typical provisions include freedom of conscience (to profess any faith or none), protection of marriage and the family (equality of spouses, care and education of children), personal inviolability, the home's inviolability, privacy of correspondence and communications, and due process limits on arrest and search. Scholars of communist constitutionalism, both Marxist−Leninist and non-Marxist, note that these rights are framed as serving collectively defined goals and are not intended to legitimise opposition to the constitutional order. For example, the freedom of demonstration were interpreted to mean the freedom to participate in pro-state demonstrations, while the freedom of association means the right to join the communist party, the transmission belt mass organisations, and other social organisations legalised by the state. It does not, according to Osakwe, include the right to associate with anti-communist causes.

These rights, from a Marxist−Leninist perspective, are granted on the expectation that citizens have participated in society and indirectly contributed to improving the communist state in question. According to this account, rights are conferred not as ends in themselves but to provide citizens the freedom necessary to maximise their contribution to the collective project of constructing a communist future. If rights are unused for that purpose or deployed to undermine socially defined aims, the state may withdraw them. Alongside rights, these constitutions enumerate several obligations. For example, citizens must observe the constitution and laws, uphold socialist law and public order, work conscientiously, protect and conserve socialist property, defend the state and guard state secrets, contribute to peace, pay taxes, protect the environment and cultural heritage, and respect the rights and dignity of others. Some communist states institutionalise civic participation in law enforcement (for example, people's control committees or neighbourhood vigilance organs). Communist constitutions also make expressly clear that the constitutional rights outlined in the constitution cannot be used to overthrow the communist state system. For example, the 1963 Yugoslav constitution declares, "These freedoms and rights shall not be used by anyone to overthrow the foundations of the socialist democratic order determined by the Constitution".

=== System of state organs ===
Communist state constitutions establish a system of state organs centred on the SSOP, meaning that all other state organs are inferior to the SSOP and are held accountable to it. The reason being that, from a Marxist–Leninist perspective, the separation of powers in capitalist states functions to confer broad, blanket powers on the executive and its military–bureaucratic apparatus. In this reading, the apparatus effectively elevates itself above the legislature in practice. In Marxist–Leninist doctrine, the communist state exists only as a transitional state formation towards a stateless communist society, with core functions that include economic management, national defence, socio-moral transformation and protection against internal enemies. State organs are to act in concert rather than being separated. In communist state constitutions, the SSOP is conceived as a working organ that combines legislative with executive functions under the unified power framework. While strict separation of powers is rejected and all state organs are subordinate to the communist party, constitutions still apportion legislative, executive and judicial roles for operational efficiency in accordance with the division of labour.

Since the SSOP was the embodiment of popular sovereignty, it was elected in non-competitive elections. Despite holding the unified powers of the state, the SSOP opted to delegate its powers to other state organs in the constitution. Also, since it was a working organ and not a parliamentary one, the constitution stipulated that it convene between one and three times a year, with sessions seldom lasting more than a couple of weeks. Elected representatives to the SSOP are not supposed to be professional politicians, and do not get paid for their work. Communist constitutions institute a system in which all representatives stand on an imperative mandate and are recallable by their elections. This is mainly because Lenin argued that "No elective institution or representative assembly can be regarded as being truly democratic and really representative of the people's will unless the elector's right to recall those elected is accepted and exercised." Communist constitutions commonly bestow SSOP representatives with legal immunity unless the permanent organ of the supreme state organ of power opts to consent to a criminal investigation of the representative in question.

The SSOP of communist states has had, since the 1936 Soviet constitution, a monopoly on legislative powers of the state. However, other state organs commonly, as was the case in the Soviet Union, had the right to issue orders, instructions, decrees, rules, and regulations that, while not laws, have the force of law. The SSOP's permanent organ, when the SSOP is not in session, is also empowered to issue decrees. While these decrees have to gain the approval of the SSOP when it convenes for a session, these sessions have very seldom rejected them.

Since the SSOP was not a permanent institution, most of its powers were delegated to the much smaller permanent organ. The SSOP elected this organ. For example, the Soviet constitution stipulated 37 members. In contrast, the Soviet SSOP had about 1,500 members. The permanent organ, while categorised similarly in each communist state, has had different names in different states. It was called presidium in Albania, Bulgaria, East Germany, present-day North Korea, and the Soviet Union; the standing committee in present-day China and Vietnam; the Presidential Council in Hungary; the Council of State in Poland; and the State Council in East Germany and Romania. Names notwithstanding, they all had an identical role in relation to the SSOP. It was empowered to convene and prorogue the SSOP, and unless the state in question has established an electoral council, organise elections to the SSOP. In situations where the electoral term of a SSOP has ended, the permanent organ remains in session until a new one is elected, despite its members being ex officio SSOP representatives. Constitutionally, unless the communist state's constitution in question established a strong individual presidency, the permanent organ acted as the collective heads of state of these states.

Communist constitutions make clear that the permanent organ is subservient to the SSOP. For example, the 1952 Polish constitution states, "In intervals between the sessions of the Sejm [the Polish SSOP], the Council of State issues decrees having the force of law. The Council of State submits its decrees for approval to the next session of the Sejm." The 1936 Soviet constitution, in its Article 48, proclaims that "The Presidium of the Supreme Soviet of the USSR is accountable to the Supreme Soviet of the USSR for all its activities." The permanent organ is also powerful in relation to the supreme judicial and supreme procuratorial organ in the sense that communist constitutions also grant them powers to interpret the constitution and laws.

The supreme executive and administrative organ is stipulated by communist state constitutions as the government. Formally, it is completely subordinated to the SSOP, which elects it and holds it accountable. It is also subordinated to the party. The primary objective of this state organ, according to the constitution, is to execute the laws and decisions of the SSOP and administer the unified state apparatus of communist states. The constitution empowers these organs to promulgate rules, regulations and orders that are not laws in the strict sense yet carry a binding effect. As sources of law, these decisions have an inferior status to both the state constitution and to decisions adopted by the SSOP. These organs are given different names in each communist state: the Council of Ministers in Albania, Bulgaria, Cuba, East Germany, Hungary, Mongolia, Poland, Romania and the Soviet Union, the State Council in China, the government in Czechoslovakia, Laos, and Vietnam, the Cabinet in North Korea, and the Federal Executive Council in Yugoslavia.

Members of the executive organ have to concurrently serve as elected representatives to the SSOP. The head of the executive organ, traditionally called the chair and in the existing communist states formally referred to as either the prime minister or the premier, is elected by the SSOP and is held personally accountable for the executive organ's activities. In communist states where more than one party exists, the other parties are often represented in the executive organ, either as ministers or state secretaries. In some communist states, the permanent organ nominates the premier, while in other states, the president does. In both cases, the SSOP has to approve the recommendation. Like other state organs, the executive organ, in between sessions of the SSOP, is accountable to the permanent organ of the SSOP.

Communist constitutions entrust a supreme judicial organ with a monopoly on adjudication. For instance, Article 102 of the 1977 USSR Constitution conferred exclusive jurisdiction to implement socialist law to the Supreme Court of the Soviet Union. In Marxist–Leninist doctrine, the justice administered by such organs is class justice, which equates the advancement of communism with justice and its obstruction with injustice. Courts, therefore, prioritise enforcing socialist laws and equity principles to protect the communist state order. This is often codified in the constitution, as it was in the 1952 Polish constitution. It does not make policy, and constitutional review and judge-made law is rejected.

Within the functional division of labour, the supreme judicial organ is accountable to the SSOP, and in between its convocations, to the permanent organ. Judges in all communist states are independent of other state organs or entities in their rulings. However, judges work within the constraints set by the SSOP. They cannot overrule decisions of the SSOP and must act in accordance with its political logic. That means that while judges in communist states can make independent judgements, they are not politically independent. The judges of communist states are supposed to function as political actors who seek to protect the communist state order. The same goes for the supreme judicial organ as a whole, which is also deemed a political organ.

The supreme procuratorial organ, which has its institutional origins in the Russian Empire, acts as the nationwide supervisor of legality in all state organs except the SSOP and its permanent organ. These organs were commonly designated as the "supreme supervisory power" of the state by communist constitutions. They were elected by and held accountable to the SSOP, and between its convocations, the permanent organ. Its electoral term varied. In the 1977 Soviet constitution, the Procurator-General of the Soviet Union was given an electoral term of seven years, two years longer than the term of the SSOP.In contrast, in China, the Supreme People's Procuratorate has the same electoral term as the SSOP. The procuratorate's remit includes supervising ministries, administrative organs, courts and other state organs to ensure precise fulfilment of laws, as reflected in Article 104 of the 1960 Czechoslovak Constitution. The procuracy does not extend its supervision to the SSOP. Unlike the courts, the procuratorate is commonly strictly centralised in its organisation: lower-level procuratorates are appointed top-down for fixed terms by the supreme procuratorial organ. Procuracy organs operate independently of other state organs and are subordinate solely to the supreme procuratorial organ, as was the case in the 1977 Soviet constitution.

Czechoslovakia and East Germany were the first communist states to introduce the office of an individual president. Until then, the SSOP's permanent organ acting as a collective head of state had been the norm. However, it is not uncommon for the individual president to serve ex officio as chair of the SSOP's permanent organ, which was the case with the president of Laos, and Romania. In most states, the president was responsible for signing and publishing the laws and nominating the premier. In certain cases, the president can also convene and head meetings of the executive organ, as in Romania and present-day Cuba. In all cases, the president of a communist state is elected by, and held accountable to, the SSOP.

There are also many unique institutions. For example, the 1977 Soviet constitution codified a People's Control Committee established by the Soviet SSOP, responsible for control work in the economy. Control organs were not unique to the Soviet Union, but other states seldom mentioned them in their constitution. Commonly, they were organised as internal sub-units of the executive organ, as was the case with the Central Council for Workers' Control and the High Court of Financial Control in communist Romania. The existing communist states have established their own unique control organs, all of which are codified in the constitution. China has established the National Supervisory Commission, Cuba the Comptroller General of Cuba, Laos the State Audit and Vietnam the State Audit. The organ of State Arbitration was also constitutionalised in the 1977 Soviet constitution, and was tasked with settling property disputes among enterprises, institutes and organisations. The head of the State Arbitration was the chief arbitrator, who the SSOP elected for an electoral term of five years.

North Korea and Yugoslavia established unique supreme organs in their constitutions. The Yugoslavs established the SFRY Presidency, with the passing of the 1974 Constitution. The North Koreans established the State Affairs Commission (SAC) in 2016 by amending the constitution. Despite both being supreme organs, their duties are described differently. The 1974 Yugoslav constitution states, "[the] Presidency is the supreme body in charge of the administration and command of the Armed Forces of the Socialist Federal Republic of Yugoslavia in war and peace." The North Korean constitution has a more limited description. It does not give the body control of the armed forces: "The State Affairs Commission is the supreme policy-oriented leadership body of State power." Instead, control of the armed forces is bestowed on the office of SAC President.

== Constitutional adoption and amendments ==
Since the SSOP is considered the holder of popular sovereignty, it is legally enshrined as the only state organ that can adopt or amend the constitution. Meaning that the SSOP holds both powers of a legislature and a constituent assembly. Indirectly, this means that communist states do not convene constituent assemblies to adopt new constitutions. Instead, every communist state has a provision that a constitution needs a two-thirds majority in the SSOP to make amendments. This has been the case in every communist state since the adoption of the first communist constitution by the All-Russian Congress of Soviets, the Russian SSOP, in 1918. That constitution granted the Russian SSOP and the permanent organ the powers of adoption and amendment of the state constitution. This was later clarified to state that the SSOP alone was empowered to adopt and amend the constitution. This became the norm in all other communist states. For example, the People's Assembly of communist Albania was empowered to "approv[ing] and amend[ing] the Constitution and the laws."

The SSOP adopts a new constitution by establishing an internal constitutional drafting commission that is responsible for formulating a draft. When the drafting committee is satisfied, the draft is made public and put forward for a nationwide discussion. For example, in the Soviet Union, official figures stated that 80% of adults participated in the nationwide discussions for the 1977 Soviet constitution, resulting in 400,000 proposals being submitted to the constitutional drafting commission. The proposals were then studied by the drafting commission, which, in the case of the 1977 Soviet constitution, led to 110 articles being amended and one article added before the draft constitution was sent to the session of the Supreme Soviet of the Soviet Union, the Soviet SSOP. A similar process took place in the making of the 1968 East German constitution, 1971 Bulgarian constitution, 1976 Cuban constitution and 1980 Vietnamese constitution. In the case of the Vietnamese constitution, 20 million took part in the nationwide discussion, which led 140 out of 147 articles being amended. Certain communist states have sought to both gain the SSOP's approval of a draft constitution and the populace in a referendum. For example, East Germany organised a constitutional referendum after the draft had been approved by the People's Chamber, the East German SSOP. The Cuban state did the same in 2019, when the Cuban SSOP approved the draft constitution and organised an election to gain popular approval.

== Constitutional supervision and enforcement ==
=== The permanent organ as supervisor ===
The world's first communist constitution, the constitution of the Russian Socialist Federative Soviet Republic, was adopted on 10 July 1918. According to Hungarian academic Otto Bihari, this constitution outlined unified power in its tenth article by stating that all state powers were conferred on the soviets. On presenting this constitution to the All-Russian Congress of Soviets, Yuri Steklov, a member of the constitutional drafting commission, stated that unlike bourgeouis constitution that set up an artificial separation of powers this constitution aimed to concentrate all state powers ("legislative, executive, judicial") into one organ: the All-Russian Congress of Soviets and its internal organs, the Central Executive Committee (CEC) and the Council of People's Commissars. This constitution, as with all other later communist state constitutions, indirectly bestowed the Soviet SSOP with the powers to supervise the constitution since, in accordance with unified power, Marxist–Leninists argue that popular sovereignty rests solely in the SSOP. This framework was strengthened in the first constitution of the Soviet Union, which was adopted in 1924. It granted the All-Union Congress of Soviets and the Central Executive Committee to decide on "all questions which they deem to be subject to their determination", meaning that their powers were unlimited. The constitution stipulated that the Soviet Supreme Court worked under the CEC's jurisdiction.

The 1924 Soviet constitution empowered the Supreme Court, under the orders of the CEC, to oversee the enforcement of the constitution by monitoring compliance among the Soviet republics. In the first statute on the Soviet Supreme Court, this power was expanded under the principle of general supervision of legality to allow the supreme court to review regulations issued by the executive and administrative organs of the Soviet state. In 1933, the responsibility for constitutional enforcement and supervision was moved from the supreme court to the Procurator General of the Soviet Union. In a bid to strengthen unified power, the 1936 Soviet constitution transferred these powers to the Presidium of the Supreme Soviet of the Soviet Union, the permanent organ of the SSOP. The Presidium was granted the right to repeal decrees and orders by all state organs that were not in conformity with the state constitution. This power was not often used, and from January 1938 to February 1969, the Presidium only discovered six constitutional violations. Delegating constitutional enforcement and supervision to the SSOP permanent organ has become the norm in communist states since the SSOP only convenes a couple of times each year.

=== SSOP special committee as supervisor ===
In certain cases, the permanent organ opts to establish special committees to supervise constitutional enforcement. East Germany became the first communist state to institute and scrap this model. The 1949 East German constitution established a Constitutional Committee of the People's Chamber, the East German SSOP. It was empowered to review whether the laws passed by the East German SSOP conformed to the constitution. However, the supervision of acts, decrees and orders issued by other state organs was bestowed on the East German SSOP as a whole. Despite its role, the committee never instituted a ruling, and it was abolished in 1968 with the adoption of a new East German constitution, transferring its powers to the State Council of East Germany.

The East German decision to abolish the Constitutional Committee was against the grain. Beginning with de-Stalinisation process initiated at the 20th Congress of the Communist Party of the Soviet Union (CPSU) in 1956, several proposals were made for establishing a "Constitutional Council", "Constitutional Commission" or "Constitutional Committee" of the Supreme Soviet, the Soviet SSOP. This committee was to be composed of both elected deputies and professional jurists and would be tasked with reviewing statutes, either at its own initiative or at the request of state organs, to ensure their conformity with the state constitution. In some proposals, this committee would even be empowered to repeal statutes that were not in conformity with the constitution. Similar discussions also took place in communist Bulgaria, but similarly to the Soviet experience, a committee was not established.

Communist Romania became the second communist state to establish a special committee devoted to constitutional enforcement with the adoption of the 1965 constitution. This committee was known as the Constitutional Commission of the Great National Assembly, the Romanian SSOP. While formally, the constitution still vested the Great National Assembly with the power to issue binding determinations on the constitutionality of statutes, in reality, it delegated this power to the Constitutional Commission. It was composed of deputies and legal experts elected for a single term identical to the electoral term of the SSOP. The commission's competence was initially limited to a posteriori review of enacted statutes, but a 1969 constitutional amendment extended its remit to preventive scrutiny of draft statutes and decrees.

The aftermath of the Hungarian Revolution of 1956 produced a debate on constitutional enforcement. Jurist János Beér called for instituting a system in which every legal rule is destined to enforce the Constitution in its entirety, and no legal rule must conflict with its provisions. Another jurist, Otto Bihari, called for bestowing the Judicial Committee of the National Assembly, the Hungarian SSOP, with the powers to supervise law-making activity of state organs in respect to their constitutionality. The constitution was amended in 1972, tried to institute a division of labour on constitutional supervision between the sessions of the SSOP and its permanent organ, the Presidential Council. A special committee of the Hungarian SSOP was not established until the constitutional amendment of 1983, which established the Constitutional Council of the National Assembly. This council was empowered to repeal all statutes that were in contravention of the constitution except those emanating from the National Assembly, the Presidential Council and the Supreme Court.

The next attempt at creating a committee devoted to constitutional supervision and enforcement occurred in the Soviet Union under Mikhail Gorbachev's leadership. At the 19th All-Union Conference of the CPSU, held in 1988, the party adopted a resolution entitled, "On Legal Reform". That resolution called for establishing a "socialist state under the rule of law". The resolution defined a socialist state under the rule of law as one where all adopted laws and decisions of state organs conformed to the Soviet constitution. To aid in that task, it called for establishing a Committee of Constitutional Supervision (CCS). Later, on 1 December 1988, the Soviet SSOP amended the constitution and established a new state structure: the Congress of People's Deputies (CPD) replaced the Supreme Soviet as the SSOP, while a Supreme Soviet replaced the Presidium of the Supreme Soviet as the permanent organ. The CPD was empowered to elect a CCS for an electoral term of 10 years. In comparison, the electoral term of the CPD was five. The members of the CCS were to be legal professionals who worked independently of the CPS and the Supreme Soviet. As with the other special committees in other communist states, the CCS lacked independent enforcement and required CPS approval for its decisions to take effect.

With the collapse of African and European communist states in 1989–1992, the five remaining communist states of China, Cuba, Laos, North Korea and Vietnam all supervised the enforcement of the constitution through the permanent organ of the SSOP. In 2013, the first draft of the 2013 Vietnamese constitution contained a provision for a Constitutional Council. The draft stated it would be elected by Vietnam's SSOP and could initiate investigations on its own, but for its decisions to be implemented, it needed to be approved by the sessions of Vietnam's SSOP. Vietnam's SSOP eventually held a preliminary vote on establishing a constitutional council, with 216 voting against and 141 voting in favour.

China was the next, and the latest, communist state to have established a special committee devoted to constitutional supervision and enforcement. Upon his election as general secretary of the Central Committee of the Chinese Communist Party in the aftermath of the 18th National Congress, held in 2012, Xi Jinping stressed the importance of "ruling the country according to the Constitution". While the words in themselves, according to scholar Keith J. Hand, were not new in themselves, the resulting policy package adopted to make this rhetoric real was. The 3rd Plenary Session of the 18th Central Committee, held in 2018, adopted a resolution on legal reforms that called for perfecting the constitutional enforcement system of the National People's Congress and its Standing Committee, respectively China's SSOP and permanent organ. It specifically called for establishing a "complete procedures and mechanisms for constitutional interpretation" [...] strengthen the filing and review system, [and] cancel and correct normative documents that violate the Constitution or the law."

Xi reconfirmed his commitment to strengthening constitutional enforcement at the 19th National Congress, held in 2017. The First Session of the 13th National People's Congress, held in 2018, amended the state constitution and transformed the Law Committee of China's SSOP into the Constitution and Law Committee (CLC). The CLC, as a special committee, officially works under the leadership of China's permanent organ and assists in its work. The members of the CLC are elected by the NPC, and convene for meetings once to twice a month. It is mainly responsible for supervision, enforcement and interpretation of the constitution. Like other special committees devoted to constitutional enforcement in communist states, the CLC's decisions are not binding and need to gain the approval of the NPC and/or its Standing Committee to be implemented. To assist in its work, China's permanent organ established a Constitution Office within the Legislative Affairs Commission, a working organ (meaning an organ led by a political officer and composed of bureaucrats).

=== The court as supervisor ===
Other communist states, specifically Czechoslovakia, Poland and Yugoslavia, opted to establish constitutional courts. The Czechoslovak attempt was adopted during the Prague Spring under reformist leader Alexander Dubček. The Czechoslovak SSOP eventually adopted the Constitutional Act on the Czechoslovak Federation, which called for a Federal Constitutional Court elected by the SSOP. However, following the Warsaw Pact invasion of Czechoslovakia, the new leadership of the Communist Party of Czechoslovakia denounced the initiative as "undertaken without Marxist-scientific preparation" and that it was based on an "uncritical glorification of a bourgeois institution", although the constitutional amendment itself was not repealed. Nevertheless, the factual establishment of the court was not undertaken until after the Velvet Revolution, as the SSOP refused to enact the necessary enabling legislation.

The Yugoslav attempt took place in the aftermath of the Soviet–Yugoslav split of 1948. The Yugoslav leaders began to actively criticise the dominant Soviet theoretical conception of socialist law, and called for strengthening judicial powers to prevent the abuse of power. The 1963 Yugoslav Constitution established the Constitutional Court, which the Federal Assembly (SSOP) elected for a term of eight years (the SSOP had an electoral term of four years). It had fourteen members (two from each republic and one from each autonomous province), and was empowered to submit to the SSOP rulings on statutes that contravened the constitution. The Yugoslav SSOP then had six months to bring the specific statute in line with the constitution, failing which the law in question would cease to apply altogether. In this sense, the Yugoslav approach strengthened judicial power within the confines of the SSOP's unified powers. For example, in 1990, the Constitutional Court held that each republican constitution—except Montenegro's—contravened the constitutional order established by the federal constitution. Since the implementation of this form of judgment (unconstitutionality of a republican or provincial constitution) depended on the SSOP, the court lacked an independent means of enforcing its decision, and in the 1990 case, the SSOP took no action to give effect to this ruling. Reflecting on the episode, the court's president, Milovan Buzađič, later described it as demonstrating "the domination of the political over the legal sector."

As with the Soviet Union, the effects of de-Stalinisation influenced legal debate in Poland. The crux was whether one could institute constitutional enforcement without the traditional confines articulated within traditional communist constitutionalism. The traditional take was that it was not, since it contravened the unified powers of the Sejm, the Polish SSOP. Legal scholar Andrzej Burda was an early proponent that the unified powers of the SSOP and an external supervisory mechanism did not weaken the SSOP's unified powers, arguing, "If an organ A exercises control over another organ B within a strictly defined scope, such a fact does not denote the general superiority of the former organ over the latter."

The 1976 constitutional amendments sought, similar to the 1972 Hungarian reforms, to institute a division of labour between the sessions of the SSOP and the permanent organ, the State Council, on constitutional supervision. However, the later Polish crisis of 1980–1981 and the rise of Solidarity forced the Polish state to reform. Solidarity at its 1981 congress had called for the establishment of a Constitutional Tribunal, which the Polish SSOP formally established on 26 March 1982. Unlike other constitutional reforms enacted in other communist states, the Polish constitutional amendments made clear that members of the Constitutional Court were independent of the SSOP. While the SSOP was empowered to elect its composition, it had to elect members "who have distinguished themselves by their legal knowledge." The Constitutional Tribunal had to submit its finding on incomformity to the constitution to the SSOP, which could then either approve or reject the submission.
