= Supreme judicial organ =

Communist state institution

The supreme judicial organ (SJO), is the highest and most powerful judicial organ in a communist state and supervises all lower-level judicial organs. Unlike the judicial branches in liberal democracies, which serve as a check on state power, SJOs focus strictly on adjudication. Communist states reject judicial independence in favor of treating the judiciary as a political organ. The SJO is directly accountable through democratic centralist procedures to the supreme state organ of power (SSOP) as the holder of unified state power. The SJO is delegated its powers by the SSOP per the principle of division of labour of state organs. It remains directly accountable to the SSOP for its work as the head of the nation's unified system of judicial organs.

== Historical background ==
Upon establishing a communist state in Russia, the supreme executive and administrative organ of state power, the Council of People's Commissars, issued the "Decree on the Abolition of Legal Institutions" on 24 November 1917. It abolished all courts, procuracies, and other legal institutions of the former Russian Empire and the Russian Republic. A nationwide judicial system was not instituted until 1923. In the same decree, the Council of People's Commissars called for establishing local courts (later given the designation "people's court") in local jurisdiction. It specifically called for them being established through democratic elections. At around the same time, the Council of People's Commissars also established Workers' and Peasants' Revolutionary Tribunals to "combat counter-revolution in order to take measures to protect the revolution and its conquests". These courts were given much leeway. According to Soviet politician Nikolai Krylenko, "In the jurisdiction of the [revolutionary] tribunals complete liberty of repression was advocated, while sentencing to death by shooting was a matter of everyday practice." Pēteris Stučka, the People's Commissariat of Justice, made clear that despite their names, these courts "were not even intended to be courts.

Upon establishing the Soviet judicial system, the guiding principle was that law was an instrument of the ruling class.

These court institutions faced constant reorganisations until 1923 when the new judicial system was established, according to scholar Vladimir Gsovski.

== Principles ==
=== Political organ ===
"The independence of soviet judges should not be understood in the sense of their independence from the socialist State. The court is an agency of the Soviet socialist State. The court may not serve any other cause but the cause of building up a socialist society, may not carry on any other policy but the policy of the Communist Party and the Soviet Government, may not carry out any will but the will of the Soviet people."

— Soviet jurist Dmitry Karev on what judicial independence in the communist state context does not mean.

A guiding principle of all SJOs in communist states is the political nature of the court as an institution. As Nikolai Krylenko noted, "the court is, in the first place, an agency for the protection of the interests of the ruling class and of a given social order". Consequently, notions of judicial impartiality and liberal judicial independence were explicitly rejected. It was argued, most prominently by Vladimir Lenin, that no court could be truly independent of the state, since the state is an instrument of the ruling class to dominate society for its own material interests. As Krylenko stated, "No court was ever above class interests, and if there were such a court, we would not care for it". This was shared by other communist states as well. Upon establishing the communist Albanian judicial system, the Democratic Front of Albania stated in 1951 that this system would act "as a powerful weapon of the Dictatorship of the Proletariat, which in our country operates in the form of the People's Democracy, and whose only reason for existence is to defend by all means and against everyone the achievement of our people's revolution."

Because courts were deemed tools of the ruling class to dominate society, they were perceived as weapons no different from, as Krylenko put it, a rifle. The main difference is that the court was an institutionalised arena that could more effectively repress its opponents and minimise errors made in judgment. As such, there was no difference, according to Soviet theorist Andrey Vyshinsky, between the Soviet secret police and the court; they were both coercive class tools to protect the communist state order. Moreover, he was very clear on court procedure and criminal law being political tools of coercion. The difference between the court and the secret police was not the level of coercion, but that the court, as an institution, allowed for public hearings with participation by the accused. Clarifying how these values were institutionalised, Soviet Minister of Justice Nikolay Rychkov stressed, in 1947, the importance of judges conducting court activities and formulating judgements designed to highlight the political quality of the case in question. This had to be accomplished so that the defendant would be clearly informed of how state policy affected the court's ruling.

"There is politics in the rule of law, and there is no rule of law that is separated from politics. Western jurists also believe that public law is only a complex form of political discourse, and the debate in the field of public law is only an extension of political debate. There is a set of political theories behind every form of rule of law, a political logic in every rule of law model, and a political position under every rule of law path. The path of socialist rule of law with Chinese characteristics that we must adhere to is essentially a concrete embodiment of the road of socialism with Chinese characteristics in the field of the rule of law. The theory of socialist rule of law with Chinese characteristics that we want to develop is essentially the theoretical achievement of the theoretical system of socialism with Chinese characteristics on the rule of law. The socialist rule of law system with Chinese characteristics that we want to build is essentially the legal manifestation of the socialist system with Chinese characteristics."

— CCP General Secretary Xi Jinping on the political character of the socialist rule of law.

In communist states, the judge is viewed as a politician and an active political actor who must be aware of the state's will, which, by definition, is the communist party's will. For example, the Communist Party of the Soviet Union (CPSU) established general guidelines for judicial work and supervised their implementation. To ensure that the state's will is enforced, the SJO must be structured to ensure that judgments are directed in line with the policy objectives pursued by the state, which means that the justice administered by the SJO is class justice, which equates the advancement of communism with justice and its obstruction with injustice. Courts, therefore, prioritise enforcing socialist laws and equity principles to protect the communist state order. This is often codified in the constitution, as it was in the 1952 Polish constitution. The Criminal Law adopted by communist Czechoslovakia in 1950 made clear that socialist legality as the adopted legal norms of the SSOP represented the will of the working class, and was to be used "to crush the people’s enemies and to protect and strengthen the dictatorship of the working class in order to build Socialism and later Communism."

Vyshinsky believed the law to be rules of conduct expressing the will of the ruling class, established through legislation by the supreme state organ of power (SSOP) or sanctioned customs. He stressed that these norms were enforced by the coercive power of the state to protect and develop the material base and political order of socialism. This interpretation reinforced the absolute primacy of the SSOP. Under the doctrine of unified state power, the SSOP is the supreme embodiment of popular sovereignty; consequently, the communist state constitution serves not as an external check on its power, but as a framework of regulating state power. Constitutional provisions thus amounted to a form of self-restraint, alterable through amendment. This emphasis on unified state power contrasted with liberal doctrines of separation of powers, which divided authority between different branches. As such, the courts do not make policy, and constitutional review and judge-made law are rejected. SJO not enacting judge-made law is in line with socialist law being part of the civil law family, but even more explicitly opposed due to the doctrine of unified state power. Consequently, the SJOs and judges of communist states are political actors who protect the communist state order.

The courts are not considered to hold any unique significance in communist states: they are state organs that are delegated power in accordance with the division of labour of state organs and, like any other state organ, are responsible for implementing the will of the SSOP. Because of that, the SJOs and the unified system of judicial organs they lead make up the unified state apparatus headed by the SSOP. As such, they are accountable to the SSOP and, between its convocations, to the permanent organ of the SSOP. However, communist constitutions also call for judicial independence, as the 1936 Soviet constitution did: "Judges shall be independent and subject only to the law." This means that judges in communist states are independent of other state organs, entities, and individuals in their rulings. However, judges work within the constraints set by the SSOP. They cannot overrule decisions of the SSOP and must act in accordance with its political logic. That means that while judges in communist states can make independent judgements, they are not politically independent.

The SJOs also have an educational function, and are responsible for educating communist state citizens in communism. For example, in 1950, the Soviet SJO ruled that judges had a special responsibility for ensuring that their judgements were of high political quality. This ensures that every court ruling reinforces state control and labour discipline. Consequently, the SJO is not merely a mechanism for resolving legal disputes but an active participant in the training of citizens in communism, and it uses the public nature of its hearings to instill a constructive attitude toward socialist property and values. Mikhail Kalinin, the head of the Soviet permanent organ from 1922 until 1946, argued that the judge must handle cases so "convincingly and demonstratively" that all present leave "totally knowledgeable about the case and deeply convinced" of the state's logic. This transformative role was further clarified by Roman Rudenko, the head of the Soviet supreme procuratorial organ from 1953 to 1981, who characterised the court as "one of the most important links in the propaganda of Soviet laws", tasked with inculcating "reverence for socialist property [and] dedication to the cause of communism".

=== Electability and accountability ===
The first communist state leaders were opposed to the liberal idea that judges had to be irremovable for them to be independent. Vladimir Lenin argued that the irremovability of judges that liberal democrats promoted was merely a partitioning of the remnants of the medieval privileges between proponents of serfdom and the bourgeoisie. In reality, irremovability cannot be fully realised, and it would be nonsensical to defend it in the case of unfit, negligent, or bad judges. He believed that by championing irremovability, the bourgeoisie could use the courts as a weapon to crush the feudal lords and remnants of feudalism in general. This system could be reproduced continuously, Lenin argued, because the average judge had a bourgeois background. This he also used as an argument against irremovability, leading to liberal judicial independence since the bourgeoisie used the state, as any other class, in their interest. Therefore, Lenin reasoned that the only way to create an independent court that reflects the population at large was to elect judges through popular vote. In this way, the judges would reflect the population at large.

The method of election has varied; the most common methods are electing judges directly in popular votes, electing judges by the state organs of power, or electing court heads by the state organs of power. The communist party is in all cases empowered to nominate candidates to stand as judges, and in several cases, transmission belt mass organisations are allowed as well, as was the case in communist Albania. Qualifications to being nominated and elected as judge are highly political. For example, during the election process of judges in Albania in 1950, it was made clear that "candidates for judges and assistant judges should be only those persons who have given proof of being linked with the state, of being decidedly in favour of protecting" the communist state order. In Bulgaria, it was made clear that a judge cannot be independent of the communist state, stating that "True court impartiality [...] is predicated on the proletarian class character of the court and its conversion into an agent of the proletarian dictatorship and instrument for implementation of the interests of the working masses." This was stressed in communist education in Czechoslovakia, which legitimised it through Vasily Filippovsky's quote, "An impartial judge, what a stupid and impractical delusion, when the legislator himself is partisan-minded."

The system to elect judges creates a line of accountability. At the higher levels, the judicial organ is always elected by a state organ of power. For example, the Chinese constitution clearly states that the Chinese SJO is responsible and accountable to the National People's Congress, China's SSOP. In between full sessions of the SSOP, the SJO is commonly accountable to the SSOP's permanent organ, as is the case in China today. This accountability takes the form of written and oral reports delivered to the sessions of the SSOP and when its not in session, to the permanent organ. This accountability mechanism means that all judges in communist states are recallable.

=== General directives, not judicial precedence ===
The first communist state legal theorists opposed the liberal concept of stare decisis, better known as judicial precedent, where prior court decisions serve as binding precedent for future cases. Pēteris Stučka argued that precedents had to be replaced by the written law adopted by the SSOP, which is in accordance with unified state power. Judges, Stučka believed, needed to develop a new communist approach to adjudication since adhering to precedent created an ossified system in which judges became blind followers of previous decisions. In 1923, the SJO of the Russian Soviet Federative Socialist Republic (Russian SFSR) made clear that court decisions were binding in other cases only if they related to one another. However, certain court decisions were treated as exemplary and could be used to influence court decisions. So while judicial organs were not bound by these exemplary decisions, as with precedents, they nevertheless were empowered to make decisions contrary to them. These decisions had to be explained to avoid protest. By publishing these exemplary cases, the SJO exercises its educational function, signaling to the wider judicial apparatus the correct political and legal interpretation for specific categories of cases without formally encroaching on the SSOP's monopoly.

The 1936 Soviet constitution bestowed the right to interpret the communist state constitution and laws on the permanent organ of the supreme state organ of power. However, the Law of the U.S.S.R. on the Judicial System adopted in 1938 bestowed upon the plenary session of the Soviet SJO the right to "give directive instructions in matters of judicial practice on the basis of decisions rendered in judicial cases tried by the U.S.S.R. Supreme Court." According to the Soviet SJO, the general directives were of a general character and not decisions applied to a specific case. However, they were mandatory for court judges when adjudicating cases that the general directives focused on. The general intention was that the SJO, through general directives, could standardise court practice in the uniform system of judicial organs and prevent them from making political mistakes when reaching their verdicts. In line with unified power, the SSOP, through its permanent organ, retained its legislation and legal interpretation. Still, by giving the Soviet SJO the power to issue general directives, it established a general framework to standardise judicial work. These general directives were highly general, hence their name.

Since the SSOP permanent organs in communist states rarely actively interpret laws, the power to adopt general directives had a similar effect to precedent. However, unlike precedent, this had a general character and was not bound to specific cases. Soviet legal theorists Sergei Golunski and Mikhail Strogovich stressed the importance of preventing judicial organs from creating precedents, which they believed were synonymous with creating new laws. All general directives and court decisions must be in line with the laws adopted by the SSOP and actively strengthen this written law system. Precedent, they believed, meant that judges made judgments independently, not based on the popular will emanating through the SSOP. Soviet legal scholar Mikhail Agarkov went further, arguing that granting the judge the power of precedence was synonymous with granting the officeholder legislative powers, thereby fragmenting the sovereignty of the SSOP.

Thus, the idea that the judge became a legislator if judicial precedent was accepted was a complete rejection of common law. The written law was hailed, and judges were given no powers to interpret the gap between the written law and actual practice. In such instances, the SJO and judges had to wait for the SSOP to adopt new legislation that filled that gap. This ensures that the SJO does not become independent from the SSOP. The SJO centralises information from several cases and issues general directives to identify patterns across them. However, it is also tasked with formulating a clear political direction for court work and informing on the political objective of the adopted SSOP legislation. The result of this process is the uniform application of the law across the state. Since the SJOs are accountable to the SSOP, and traditionally, to the permanent organ of the SSOP, its general directives can be reinterpreted by the permanent organ.

=== Legislative initiative ===
Unlike liberal judiciaries, which are restricted to interpreting existing law, the SJO is empowered to exercise legislative initiative. It ensures that the written law adopted by the SSOP is constantly updated to reflect the shifting political wind, thereby preventing the legal system from becoming detached from the SSOP's and the communist party's objectives. The SJOs are responsible for informing the SSOP's permanent organ when implementing a law encounters difficulties, and the permanent organ will then have the option to accept or reject the advice.

=== Reopening of Cases and Review ===
SJOs reject the liberal legal doctrines of res judicata and ne bis in idem. Res judicata means 'judged matter', literally that a court's final judgement is final and cannot be raised again, while ne bis in idem means that no individual can be judged on the same matter twice. This means that the court's adjudication result can be appealed by other courts, procurators, and individual citizens. A private party, a defendant, and an advokat could appeal the court's decision to the court above. The decision this court makes is final and can not be appealed. This channel in the Soviet Union was open to private parties, from the lowest-level court to the provincial court. The decisions of the SJOs of the Soviet republics could not be appealed, and the USSR SJO did not take up cases from private parties. Unlike private parties, the Soviet supreme procuratorial organ and lower-level procurators could appeal cases as private parties, and in the Soviet Union, this process was referred to as protest. Procurators down to the regional level and court presidents above the lowest people's court could lodge a motion to reopen a closed case at any point, which instigates a supervisory review of it, in which the appealing party takes part. The review is conducted in camera behind closed doors without the presence of the private parties. There were no limits for when a procurator or a court president could initiate an appeal, meaning that a case could be opened whenever. However, these appeals are limited to court decisions that are perceived to threaten legislation adopted by the SSOP: "if the decision is in contradiction to the fundamentals of soviet legislation or the general policy of the workers’ and peasants’ government or otherwise violates the interests of the State and the toiling masses."

The practical consequences of rejecting res judicata and ne bis in idem can be seen through a 1936 Soviet housing dispute, in which six different decisions were rendered over two years through the protest system. The case, which involved a rent dispute over a nine-square-yard room, drew the attention of the Russian and the USSR supreme procuratorial organs, turning a private civil matter into a multi-tiered state review. By 1954, the establishment of court presidiums at the regional level institutionalised this supervisory review function, ensuring that senior judicial organs, vetted by local state organs of power, retained the power to nullify final judgments at any time. The practical application of supervisory review transformed the SJO from a court of law into an administrative supervisor. In the mid-1930s, Vyshinsky reported that motions to reopen were filed in up to 73% of criminal cases, with a near-100 % success rate. This created a shadow legal process: while trials were public and educational, the true finality of a case was determined in camera, behind closed doors, through a series of informal petitions and state protests. This procedural fluidity ensured that no judicial decision was ever beyond the reach of political correction by either SJO (or one of its lower-level organs) or the procuracy.

== Relationship with other judicial-supervisory state organs and the party ==
The SJO has an interconnected relationship with the supreme executive and administrative organ (SEAO), the supreme people's procuratorate and public security organs, as well as the supreme supervisory organ and the supreme auditing organ, if they exist in the given communist state in question. In the traditional communist state model established by the Soviet Union, the SJO and lower-level courts that make up the unified system of judicial organs were subject to administrative supervision by the SEAO, commonly through its justice ministry. For example, the Albanian Minister of Justice was tasked with controlling and directing the work of the courts and its internal organisation, directing the organisational make up of notaries and lawyers, and training personnel working in the SJO. It was the same case in communist Romania, where the Ministry of Justice controlled the entire legal system. It not only administered it but also controlled how judges acted, supervised legal officials such as marshals and notaries, and strictly guided the newly reorganized bar associations. The goal of this oversight was to ensure that every legal professional worker worked toward a single political outcome: the strengthening and expansion of the Romanian Communist Party's political goals. This system was instituted in China as well, with the SJO and the justice ministry even having the same party organisation. This system was abolished first in 1959, when the justice ministry was abolished and its administrative functions transferred to the SJO. Upon the ministry's reestablishment in 1979, the administrative functions of budgeting, staffing, and organizational management of lower courts were returned to the ministry. In 1983, these administrative functions were transferred back to the SJO without abolishing the justice ministry.

The Chinese constitution states, "In handling criminal cases, the [SJO and lower-level courts], the [SPP and lower-level procuratorates] and [the Ministry of Public Security and lower-level public security bureaus] should each be responsible for their respective tasks, work together with each other, and act as checks on each other to ensure the faithful and effective enforcement of the law." These organs collaborate in the process of apprehending, investigating, and judging a criminal case. The public security bureaus, the police in Chinese parlance, investigate and detain people, while the procuracy is responsible for approving the arrest and prosecuting the case, and the courts are responsible for adjudication and sentencing. The SPP also supervises the criminal process of the public security bureaus and the adjudication process in the courts to ensure they conform to the law. The Chinese supreme supervisory organ, the National Supervisory Commission (NSC), is charged with handling "all professional misconduct committed by public officials". Upon completing an investigation in which crimes have been committed, the NSC hands over the case to the SPP, which, if it concurs with the NSC's findings, sends it to the SJO for handling.

The SJOs are also supervised by a communist party in line with the Leninist principles of the leading role of the party and democratic centralism. In the Soviet Union, the Administrative Organs Department of the Central Committee of the Communist Party of the Soviet Union was responsible for supervising the courts alongside the rest of the judicial sector. It was charged with vetting candidates for judicial posts and ensuring that the party line was implemented by the SJO. Within the Central Committee of the Communist Party of Vietnam, the Central Internal Affairs Commission, as the internal office of the Politburo's Central Steering Committee on Anti-corruption, is tasked with supervising the SJO and the remainder of the judicial sector. The Central Political and Legal Affairs Commission of the Chinese Communist Party's Central Committee is tasked with supervising and coordinating the SJO and other law enforcement organs, and the head of the Chinese SJO serves as a member of the organ. Commonly, ruling communist parties establish leading party member groups within state organs at every level of governance, including the SJO. In China, the leading party members group of China's SJO organises members in that organ and reports directly to the Central Committee on its work.
