= SJO =

SJO may refer to:

- Supreme judicial organ, the highest and most powerful judicial organ in a communist state
- Juan Santamaría International Airport, San José, Costa Rica, by IATA code
- Xibe language, a Tungusic language spoken in Xinjiang, China, by ISO 639-3 code
