= Hungarian Constitution of 1949 =

The Hungarian Constitution of 1949 was a communist state constitution adopted on 20 August 1949^{[a]} and significantly revised two times: on 26 April 1972 and on 23 October 1989, with the latter revision transforming it into a liberal democratic constitution.^{[b]} The document was Hungary's first permanent written constitution, and until its replacement in 2011, the country was the only former Eastern Bloc nation that did not adopt an entirely new constitution after the fall of Communism. The Fundamental Law of Hungary, adopted in 2011, declares the 1949 constitution to be invalid.

== History ==
=== Adoption and amendments ===
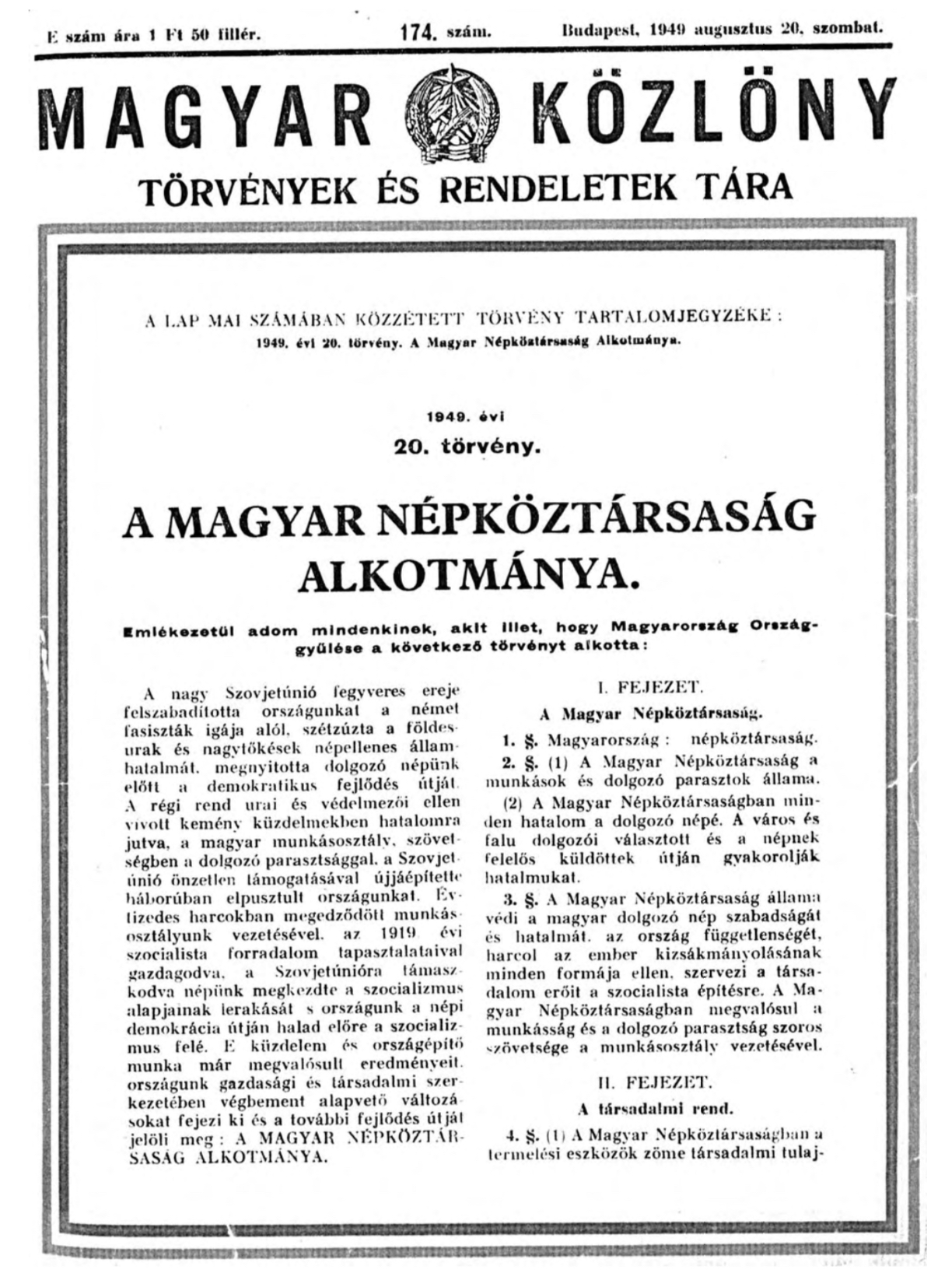
First page of the 1949 constitution, as published in Magyar Közlöny

Following the end of World War II and after the country had been occupied by the Soviet Union, democratic elections were held under Statute VIII of 1945. Then, Statute I of 1946, a provisional constitutional statute (or "little constitution") passed on 31 January, formally ended the monarchy and introduced a republican form of government. Then in 1949, after the Hungarian Working People's Party had assumed undisputed control of the country, the Communist-controlled parliament adopted a constitution as Act XX of 1949. The date of its adoption, 20 August, made a new national holiday that coincided with the traditional holiday of the feast of Saint Stephen. The document has been described as "a slavish imitation of the Soviet-type constitutions, with some variations resulting from the historical and political differences between the Soviet Union and Hungary". (Specifically, it was modelled on the "Stalin" 1936 Soviet Constitution.) Now, Hungary became a people's republic, which was "the state of the workers and working peasants". A Presidential Council elected by parliament was to be head of state, but real power rested with the Working People's Party, its leading role enshrined in the document. The National Assembly met for some ten days each year, with most rules taking the form of presidential and ministerial decrees. A variety of fundamental rights was guaranteed, but only for the working people (or in accordance with their interests). Moreover, no means existed of ensuring these rights' mandatory nature or of rendering them enforceable. Church and state were separated.

Until 1989, the charter's basic features remained in effect, although the regime added important amendments in 1950, 1953, 1954, 1972, and 1983. Notably, Act I of 26 April 1972 comprehensively redrafted the constitution, proclaiming Hungary a socialist state. While the social, economic and political order remained the same, fundamental rights were now guaranteed for all citizens (but certain rights, like freedom of speech, press or assembly, still had to conform with the interests of socialism and the people). The preamble still paid tribute to the Soviet "liberators" but took a longer historical perspective, referring to the "millennium" of the people's struggle. The role of mass movements and trade unions (in addition to the party) in the building of socialism was acknowledged, the equal ranking of state and cooperative ownership asserted, and private producers recognised, so long as they did not "violate collective interests". As a moderate liberalisation continued to set in during the ensuing years, Act II of 1983 set up a Constitutional Council, intending to watch over the constitutionality of legal rules by giving internal review; and Act X of 1987 limited the Presidential Council's authority to issue law-decrees. Reforms were accelerated in 1989, with Act I envisaging the establishment of a Constitutional Court and lifting political restrictions on the exercise of all fundamental rights, and Act VIII introducing the motion of no confidence vis-à-vis the Council of Ministers and its members.

=== 1989 reforms ===
From 1988 on, as the economic situation deteriorated and opposition groups emerged, the idea of preparing a new constitution emerged. Reform Communists and the opposition took account of this development at the Hungarian Round Table Talks in mid-1989, desiring a document that would establish a multiparty system, parliamentary democracy and a social market economy. However, time constraints did not allow a completely new constitution to be written. On 18 October, the National Assembly approved a comprehensive amendment package which allowed the 1949 Constitution to prevail until a new constitution was framed. The reform (Act XXXI of 1989), changed nearly 100 provisions of the 1949 Constitution, and pruned out its Communist character. It was the first thoroughgoing constitutional transformation in the Soviet bloc. It was adopted like a normal constitutional amendment, and was passed by a margin of 333-5 (with eight abstentions)–well above the required two-thirds majority. The amended constitution went into effect on 23 October, the anniversary of the Hungarian Revolution of 1956.

The 1989 reform established Hungary as an independent, democratic, constitutional republic that was both civil democratic and democratic socialist. The economy was to be a social market one, with planning employed and public and private property enjoying equal protection. The people were sovereign, with parties functioning freely. Among the new features introduced were a weak presidency and strong parliament with oversight powers, checks and balances, limitations on the authority of the prime minister, provisions for referendums, and an independent judiciary. Outside the preamble, all references to "socialism" were carefully deleted. The Constitutional Court, whose members are elected by two-thirds of parliament, can annul laws declared unconstitutional, and has broad jurisdiction. The parliamentary term was reduced from five to four years. Human rights were emphasized, with reference to the International Covenant on Civil and Political Rights and the International Covenant on Economic, Social and Cultural Rights. The changes were all-encompassing: it was said, with some exaggeration, that the only provision that remained untouched named Budapest as the capital. However, the form of the state was not changed; it was still described as a parliamentary democracy with parliament as "a supreme organ of state power and popular representation" that retained the power to elect the highest executive and judicial officers of the state.

Andrew Arato, an expert on constitutions in new democracies, places the 1989 text under his "post-sovereign" constitution making paradigm, so called because no single body with full powers is tasked with drafting a new constitution. Rather, the model involves a body such as a round table of major political forces drafting an interim constitution, followed by a freely elected one composing a final draft. Aside from Poland and Hungary, this method was used several years later to create the Constitution of South Africa. In Hungary, the preamble of the 1989 modification referred to its temporary character, a fact recalled when it was finally replaced by an entirely new constitution over two decades later.

=== Developments from 1990 to 2010 ===
After 1989, the constitution was amended multiple times. The first changes came in 1990 when, after free elections brought the opposition to power, references to democratic socialism and the planned economy were dropped. (When these had been included half a year earlier, the Communists were thought to be much more popular than these elections would show). Also that year, a pact between the Hungarian Democratic Forum (MDF), who had won the elections, and the Alliance of Free Democrats (SZDSZ), who came in second, resulted in additional changes. The President was to be elected by the Parliament rather than directly; the constructive vote of no confidence was introduced; and areas in which a two-thirds majority was required to adopt a law were reduced, making governing easier. In exchange for agreeing to this set of MDF proposals, Árpád Göncz of the SZDSZ was elected president. In 1994, the list of issues to be decided by parliament with a two-thirds majority was shortened, and the Constitutional Court was shrunk from 15 to 11 judges. In 1995, when the possibility of completing the democratic transition via a new constitution arose, an amendment was adopted requiring four-fifths of Parliament to agree to the drafting rules. This enhanced supermajority provision was meant to ensure that the replacement constitution would enjoy broad acceptance. In 1997 an amendment streamlined the judicial system, while later modifications allowed Hungary to join the European Union. In late 2010, even as a new constitution was being prepared, an amendment was passed restricting the powers of the Constitutional Court on budget-related laws. Prior to its replacement, the document included a preamble and was divided into fifteen chapters with 79 articles.

In the mid-1990s, Prime Minister Gyula Horn unsuccessfully tried to enact a new constitution. In 2006, during Ferenc Gyurcsány's premiership, a new charter was drafted for internal use which mentioned the Holy Crown of Hungary and placed the Chief Prosecutor of Hungary under government control; its contents were not made public until the 2011 debate on a new constitution. When a new constitution was ultimately adopted that year, it included the provision that Hungarians "do not recognize the communist constitution of 1949, since it was the basis for tyrannical rule". Thus, the 1949 document, including the changes made in 1989 and afterward, was explicitly rejected.

At first, as the only Communist-era constitution retained in Eastern Europe, Hungary's charter and by extension its political system did not command a great deal of respect. The fact that it was preserved reflected a tradition of gradualism in Hungarian constitutional history; there was no constitutional assembly or referendum to confer additional legitimacy on the new system. And in particular, the enthusiastic Constitutional Court seemed more intent on applying German case law than the Hungarian constitution. However, it gained stature from the early 1990s for three reasons. First, the process of gradual amendments allowed for experimentation that remedied some of its weaknesses. Second, the 1989 document became stable in 1997 when the government abandoned plans for drafting a new constitution. Finally, the Court never disregarded the constitution altogether, remaining acutely aware of its text.

== Notes ==
The document was initially titled Constitution of the Hungarian People's Republic (Hungarian: A Magyar Népköztársaság Alkotmánya).

The document was thenceforth titled Constitution of the Republic of Hungary (A Magyar Köztársaság Alkotmánya).
