= 1977 Constitution of the Soviet Union =

Supreme Soviet of the Soviet Union
- Long title: Constitution (Fundamental Law) of the Union of Soviet Socialist Republics
- Territorial extent: Soviet Union
- Enacted by: Supreme Soviet of the Soviet Union
- Signed by: Leonid Brezhnev
- Effective: 7 October 1977
- Repealed: 26 December 1991

Repeals
- 1936 Constitution of the Soviet Union
- Status: Repealed

The 1977 Constitution of the Soviet Union, officially the Constitution of the Union of Soviet Socialist Republics, (Note: Russian: Конституция Союза Советских Социалистических Республик, romanized: Konstitutsiya Soyuza Sovetskikh Sotsialisticheskikh Respublik) was the communist state constitution adopted on 7 October 1977.

The 1977 Constitution, also known as the Brezhnev Constitution or the Constitution of Developed Socialism, was the third and final constitution of the Soviet Union, adopted unanimously at the 7th (Special) Session of the Ninth Convocation of the Supreme Soviet and signed by Chairman of the Presidium Leonid Brezhnev. The 1977 Constitution replaced the 1936 Constitution and the Soviet public holiday of USSR Constitution Day was shifted from 5 December to 7 October.

The 1977 Constitution's preamble stated that "the aims of the dictatorship of the proletariat having been fulfilled, the Soviet state has become the state of the whole people" and no longer represented the workers and peasants alone. The 1977 Constitution extended the scope of the constitutional regulation of society compared to the 1924 and 1936 constitutions. The first chapter defined the leading role of the Communist Party of the Soviet Union (CPSU) and established the organizational principles for the state and the government. Article 1 defines the USSR as a socialist state, as did all previous constitutions:

The Union of Soviet Socialist Republics is a socialist state of the whole people, expressing the will and interests of the workers, peasants, and intelligentsia, the working people of all the nations and nationalities of the country.

The 1977 Constitution was long and detailed, including twenty-eight more articles than the 1936 Soviet Constitution and explicitly defined the division of responsibilities between the central government of the Soviet Union in Moscow and the governments of the republics. Later chapters established principles for economic management and cultural relations. The 1977 Constitution included Article 72, which granted the official right of constituent republics to secede from the Soviet Union promised in previous constitutions. However, Articles 74 and 75 stated that when a Soviet constituency introduced laws in contradiction to Supreme Soviet, the laws of the Supreme Soviet would supersede any legal difference, but the Union law which regulated the secession was not provided until the last days of the Soviet Union.

Article 74. The laws of the USSR shall have the same force in all Union Republics. In the event of a discrepancy between a Union Republic law and an All-Union law, the law of the USSR shall prevail.

Article 75. The territory of the Union of Soviet Socialist Republics is a single entity and comprises the territories of the Union Republics. The sovereignty of the USSR extends throughout its territory.

The 1977 Constitution was repealed upon the dissolution of the Soviet Union on 26 December 1991 and the post-Soviet states adopted new constitutions. Article 72 would play an important role in the dissolution despite the lacuna in the Soviet law, which was eventually filled under the pressure from the Republics in 1990.

== Amendment process ==
Soviet souvenir sheet from 1977 celebrating the adoption of the 1977 Constitution.

Adoption of the Constitution was a legislative act of the Supreme Soviet. Amendments to the Constitution were likewise adopted by legislative act of that body. Amendments required the approval of a two-thirds majority of the deputies of the Congress of People's Deputies and could be initiated by the congress itself; the Supreme Soviet, acting through its commissions and committees; the Presidium or chairman of the Supreme Soviet; the Constitutional Oversight Committee; the Council of Ministers; republic soviets; the Committee of People's Control; the Supreme Court; the Procuracy; and the chief state arbiter. In addition, the governing bodies of official organizations and even the Academy of Sciences could initiate amendments and other legislation.

The principal source of uncensored information and comment in the USSR noted in August 1977 that the proposed Constitution "has given rise to a number of letters containing serious comments and well-argued proposals. Although these letters were sent to the Constitution Commission, not one of them was even mentioned in the Soviet newspapers or official media," it is quite possible that, like the letters department of all major Soviet periodicals, some note was privately taken of these views.

Soviet constitutions were frequently amended and had been changed more often than the constitutions of most Western countries. Nevertheless, the 1977 Constitution attempted to avoid frequent amendment by establishing regulations for government bodies (especially the lists of ministries, state commissions, and other bodies in the 1936 constitution) in separate, but equally authoritative, enabling legislation, such as the Law on the Council of Ministers of 5 July 1978. Other enabling legislation has included a law on citizenship, a law on elections to the Supreme Soviet, a law on the status of Supreme Soviet deputies, regulations for the Supreme Soviet, a resolution on commissions, regulations on local government, and laws on the Supreme Court and the Procuracy. The enabling legislation provided the specific and changing operating rules for these government bodies.

== Amendments to the 1977 Constitution ==
In October 1988, draft amendments and additions to the 1977 Constitution were published in the Soviet media for public discussion. Following the public review process, the Supreme Soviet adopted the amendments and additions in December 1988. The amendments and additions substantially and fundamentally changed the electoral and political systems. Although Soviet officials touted the changes as a return to "Leninist" forms and functions, citing that the Congress of People's Deputies had antecedents in the Congress of Soviets, they were unprecedented in many respects. The position of chairman of the Supreme Soviet was formally designated and given specific powers, particularly leadership over the legislative agenda, the ability to issue orders (rasporiazheniia), and formal power to conduct negotiations and sign treaties with foreign governments and international organizations. Later still, the chairman of the Supreme Soviet's non-legislative powers would be transferred to the newly created office of President. The Constitutional Oversight Committee, composed of people who were not in the Congress of People's Deputies, was established and given formal power to review the constitutionality of laws and normative acts of the central and republican governments and to suggest their suspension and repeal. The electoral process was constitutionally opened up to multiple candidacies, although not multi-party candidacies. A legislative body—the Supreme Soviet—was to convene for regular spring and fall sessions, each lasting three to four months. Unlike the old Supreme Soviet, however, the new Supreme Soviet was indirectly elected by the population, being elected from among the members of the Congress of People's Deputies.

== Constitutional rights ==
The Soviet Constitution included a series of civil and political rights. Among these were the rights to freedom of speech, freedom of the press, and freedom of assembly and the right to religious belief and worship. In addition, the Constitution provided for freedom of artistic work, protection of the family, inviolability of the person and home, and the right to privacy. In line with the Marxist-Leninist ideology of the government, the Constitution also granted social and economic rights not provided by constitutions in some capitalist countries. Among these were the rights to work, rest and leisure, health protection, care in old age and sickness, housing, education, and cultural benefits.

Unlike Western constitutions, the Soviet Constitution outlined limitations on political rights, whereas in capitalist countries these limitations are usually left up to the legislative and/or judicial institutions. Article 6 effectively eliminated partisan opposition and division within government by granting to the CPSU the power to lead and guide society. Article 39 enabled the government to prohibit any activities it considered detrimental by stating that "Enjoyment of the rights and freedoms of citizens must not be to the detriment of the interests of society or the state." Article 59 obliged citizens to obey the laws and comply with the standards of socialist society as determined by the Party. The government did not treat as inalienable those political and socioeconomic rights the Constitution granted to the people. Citizens enjoyed rights only when the exercise of those rights did not interfere with the interests of the state, and the CPSU alone had the power and authority to determine policies for the government and society. For example, the right to freedom of expression stipulated in Article 52 could be suspended if the exercise of that freedom failed to be in accord with Party policies. Until the era of glasnost, freedom of expression did not entail the right to criticize the government. The constitution did provide a "freedom of conscience, that is, the right to profess or not to profess any religion, and to conduct religious worship or atheistic propaganda." It prohibited incitement of hatred or hostility on religious grounds.

The Constitution also failed to provide political and judicial mechanisms for the protection of rights. Thus, the Constitution lacked explicit guarantees protecting the rights of the people. In fact, the Supreme Soviet never introduced amendments specifically designed to protect human rights. Neither did the people have a higher authority within the government to which to appeal when their rights were violated. Unlike in a democratic system, there was no constitutional court with the power to ensure that constitutional rights were observed by legislation or were respected by the rest of the government. The Soviet Union also signed the Final Act of the Conference on Security and Cooperation in Europe (Helsinki Accords), which mandated that internationally recognized human rights be respected in the signatory countries, yet it was not until the late 1980s that realigning constitutional and domestic law with international commitments on human rights was publicly debated.

== Role of the citizen ==
Article 59 of the Constitution stated that citizens' exercise of their rights was inseparable from performance of their duties. Articles 60 through 69 defined these duties. Citizens were required to work and to observe labor discipline. The legal code declared evasion of work to be a crime of "parasitism" and provided punishment for it. The Constitution also obliged citizens to protect socialist property and oppose corruption. All citizens performed military service as a duty to safeguard and "enhance the power and prestige of the Soviet state." Violation of this duty was considered "a betrayal of the Motherland and the gravest of crimes". Finally, the Constitution required parents to train their children for socially useful work and to raise them to be worthy members of the socialist society.

The Constitution and other legislation protected and enforced Soviet citizenship. Legislation on citizenship granted equal rights of citizenship to naturalized citizens as well as to the native born. Laws also specified that citizens could not freely renounce their citizenship. Citizens were required to apply for permission to do so from the Presidium of the Supreme Soviet, which could reject the application if the applicant had not completed military service, had judicial duties, or was responsible for family dependants. In addition, the Presidium could refuse the application to protect national security, or revoke citizenship for defamation of the Soviet Union or for acts damaging to national prestige or security.

== See also ==
- 1924 Soviet Constitution
- 1936 Soviet Constitution
- Article 6 of the Soviet Constitution
- Bibliography of the Post Stalinist Soviet Union § Government
- "Discussion of Draft Constitution", Chronicle of Current Events, Nos 46 & 47, August & November 1977.
