= Division of labour of state organs =

State power principle of communist states

The division of labour of state organs is a Marxist–Leninist principle of communist state governance that delineates how the supreme state organ of power (SSOP), as the sole holder of unified power, delegates its powers to inferior state organs and coordinates them. Under this principle, the SSOP delegates specific functions, called the division of labour, to inferior, specialized state organs to ensure administrative efficiency while maintaining the unified nature of the state. This arrangement is the practical application of democratic centralism to the unified state apparatus, ensuring that while various organs perform distinct roles, they remain part of a single vertical chain of command strictly subordinate to the SSOP. This contrasts with systems based on independent branches of government as in the separation of power and fusion of power, as the division is purely administrative and does not create separate, co-equal centers of power.

== Historical and theoretical origins ==
Marxism's opposition to the separation of power can be traced back to the writings of Jean-Jacques Rousseau, Karl Marx, and Friedrich Engels. Marx admired the Paris Commune's unification of legislative and executive powers in one organ: the Commune Council, which was a "working, not a parliamentary, body, executive and legislative at the same time." Vladimir Lenin, the key initiator of the establishment of the Russian Soviet Federative Socialist Republic and the Soviet Union, was influenced by the writings of Marx and Engels. Under Lenin's leadership, Russian communists established the world's first SSOP, the All-Russian Congress of Soviets, when it convened for its first session on 16 June 1917. On presenting the draft Russia's first communist constitution, Yuri Steklov (a member of the constitutional drafting committee) said that unlike a bourgeois constitution with an artificial separation of state powers, the Soviet constitution aimed to concentrate all these powers ("legislative, executive, judicial") into one organ: the All-Russian Congress of Soviets and its internal organs, the Central Executive Committee and the Council of People's Commissars.

The 1936 Soviet constitution, unlike its 1918 counterpart, bestowed a monopoly of legislative powers on the Supreme Soviet of the Soviet Union, the Soviet SSOP. Joseph Stalin advocated for this change to prevent multiple state organs from legislating, asserting that the legal system could only be stable if one organ monopolised legislative powers. In line with this, the constitution clearly delineates the duties and responsibilities of each state organ. Andrey Vyshinsky, a Procurator General of the Soviet Union, argued that this change did not weaken their opposition to the separation of powers. To effectively manage the state's comprehensive functions, Vyshinsky reasoned, especially the complex tasks of governing both the people and the economy, the constitution had clearly delineated the jurisdiction of all state organs. This new arrangement, Vyshinsky argued, constituted a division of labour. All state power was still held to originate from the SSOP. This ensured that, despite the administrative specialization, the unified power of the state remained intact.

In this new system of division of labour, the Soviet SSOP was presented by the constitution as not infringing upon matters specifically assigned to other state organs. These specialized organs were responsible and accountable to the SSOP. Consequently, the Supreme Soviet's power to exercise unlimited state power was structured and channeled by its own constitution, which addressed matters that did not fall within the constitutional competencies of these specialized organs. While the state organs of power are granted a legislative monopoly, this does not mean that they don't hold executive power. The state organs of power and their permanent organs are working organs that hold legislative and executive powers. Meaning that the state organs of power can make executive decisions, but they do not partake in the administration of those decisions. The SSOP and the state organs of power ensure unified policy in a manner that inferior state organs cannot, and are responsible for providing correct political guidance. Soviet commentators praised this feature, viewing the 1936 Constitution as successfully providing an unbalanced relationship between state organs in favour of the SSOP.

The competences of the state organs of power are such that they are, in many respects, similar to the nature of the competence of executive organs; both types of organs must establish general rules of conduct, engage in setting technical and economic standards, and settle questions of planning, finance, and organizational matters. The two systems are differentiated only by the fact that the executive organs are dominated by operative-technical and material-administrative activity. Because of this, the state organs of power should not interfere too much in the activities of the inferior state organs. Wu Bangguo, the chairman of the permanent organ of China's SSOP (the Standing Committee of the National People's Congress), clarified this in 2008: "The [Chinese SSOP], in exercising unified state power, must fulfill its duties responsibly, but may not substitute for the exercise of administrative power, judicial power, or procuratorial power."

The functions that the specialised state organs would be responsible for encompassed everything from normative regulation of society, administrative and political directives, economic planning, technical standards, to the enforcement of law. To manage these tasks, the inferior state organs were differentiated based on the nature of the functions they perform. State organs are classified into various types, including executive-administrative organs, enterprise administration, control organs, and judicial and procuratorial organs. This classification, based on the content of the functions, reflects the necessary existence of different systems of organs, each distinguished by its method of formation, jurisdiction, and methods of activity. Since the balance between the state organs of power and the other state organs is unbalanced in favour of the state organs, it means that the inferior state organs work in a unified manner under their leadership.

== System of state organs of power ==
The governance system of communist states is based on a system of state organs of power that culminates in a supreme state organ of power (SSOP) that acts as the state's supreme organ. The SSOP is believed to be the holder of popular sovereignty, and is, therefore, enshrined with the unified powers of the state. This means that the powers of the lower-level state organs of power, which exist at every level of governance, derive their powers from the SSOP, which delegates its powers to them. This is commonly done through the communist state constitution and further specified in a separate law. This means that the lower-level state organs of power, despite often being elected directly in controlled elections, are not considered sovereign in the given territorial jurisdiction they have been elected in. Since neither the SSOP nor the lower-level state organs of power are in permanent session, it delegates most of its powers to a standing body known as the permanent organ.

=== Delegation of power to other state organs ===
The relationship between state organs of power and their permanent organs with the other state organs at the corresponding level remains consistent at every level of governance. The state organ of power in question establishes, supervises, and holds the other state organs accountable to it. Meaning that the other state organs, like the governments and the courts, are not functionally separate or independent of the state organs of power. The relationship between the state organs of power and their permanent organs with other state organs is not one of opposition, but rather one of collaboration. The state organs of power, as well as the permanent organs when they are not in session, actively supervise them to ensure unified governance. Peng Zhen, a leading member of the Chinese Communist Party under Mao Zedong and Deng Xiaoping, argued that this division of labour between state organs could avoid excessive centralization of power and increase overall efficiency.

The division of labour is established through the constitution and laws. They produce a formal delegation of powers, responsibilities, and obligations from the state organ of power in question to another state organ. Since the state organ of power in question is the holder of unified power in the given jurisdiction, it supervises the other organs to ensure common collaboration for common goals. This oversight is intended to ensure that other state organs operate strictly within the law and that unified power ultimately serves the people.

The other state organs have to implement the decisions of the SSOP and the state organ of power at the corresponding level. In communist governance, the other state organs, represented here by the executive and administrative, judicial, and procuratorial organs, realise popular sovereignty by implementing the decisions, resolutions, and laws of the state organs of power. Recognising that state power originates from the people, the state organs of power, despite delegating certain powers to other state organs, retain the exclusive right to ensure compliance with their decisions. Proponents argue this ensures that all state powers belong to the people.

Accountability is ensured through supervision by the state organs of power and its permanent organ over the other state organs. Normally, the state organs of power are entitled to hearing and reviewing the work of the state organs at the same level. When the state organ of power is not in session, this power is delegated to the permanent organ. The organs, in turn, are obligated to report their work to these two organs. Urgent issues must also be reported to the state organ of power, and when it's not in session, to the permanent organ. In every communist state, the state organs of power are given a constitutional monopoly to elect, appoint, remove, and recall the personnel of all other state organs at the corresponding level. Theoretically, the SSOP can elect, appoint, remove, and recall every state official. This personnel control ensures that all organs remain subordinate and accountable to the state organ of power in question, maintaining the state's unified power structure.

=== Legal foundation ===
Democratic centralism is the mandatory constitutional principle that structures the state's division of labour. Rather than a separate concept, the division of labour is the specialized administrative mechanism through which democratic centralism and unified power achieve their goals of democratic legitimacy and effective governance. In China, for instance, this principle is explicitly codified as the foundation of state institutions. Consequently, any organ established by the constitution is bound by its norms—an enforcement mechanism known as forced convergence. This political constraint structurally compels the system to define a division of labour for all specialized organs. Thus, democratic centralism is not merely a statement of unified leadership; it is the source of the organizational rules governing the relationship between superior and subordinate state organs.

The constitutional division of labour serves the dual objectives inherent in democratic centralism. The need for effective governance drives the creation of specialized organs, mandating that each one maximize its performance through professional specialization (e.g., the executive organ focusing on administration). Simultaneously, democratic centralism mandates institutional coupling, which requires these specialized organs to coordinate their efforts. From the communist perspective, this prevents specialization from leading to administrative chaos and ensures the strong synergy needed to manage a complex state. This interaction is formalized through a system of adjacent norms that regulate the balance between division, cooperation, and restraint. Cooperation is achieved through mechanisms like one organ requesting assistance from a more competent peer, while restraint is enforced through authoritative professional standards that prevent infringement on a specialized function, such as the exclusive procuratorial powers of the supreme procuratorial organ. Ultimately, the aim of this framework is to ensure that specialization reinforces, rather than undermines, the unified political will enforced by democratic centralism.
