= Transmission belt =

Marxist–Leninist analogy

Transmission belt is a Marxist–Leninist analogy to describe interactions of the communist party with the people in a communist state via mass organizations, such as trade unions. All these institutions worked under the party's leadership. Examples of transmission belt organizations include the All-Union Leninist Young Communist League (Komsomol), the All-Union Central Council of Trade Unions of the Soviet Union, and the All-China Federation of Trade Unions.

A "transmission belt" connecting a tractor engine (behind the water tender) with a stationary thresher, extracting grain and generating a stack of waste straw.

The term derives from early 20th century agriculture, in which the engines of tractors provided operational power to engineless stationary threshing machines via long straps called "transmission belts."

The metaphor was first used by Russian Communist Party leader Vladimir Lenin in his speech to the 8th All-Russian Congress of Soviets, the All-Russian Central Council of Trade Unions and the Moscow City Council of Trade Unions, on 30 December 1920.
