= Supreme executive and administrative organ =

Communist state institution

The supreme executive and administrative organ, also known as the executive organ of the supreme state organ of power and the highest state administrative organ, is, in liberal democratic parlance, the executive organ of communist states. It is also synonymous with the term government, which in communist terminology does not mean the state at large but only its executive and administrative functions. The Council of People's Commissars of the Russian Soviet Federative Socialist Republic was the world's first executive and administrative organ of a communist state. Except for Cuba, the other existing communist states of China, Laos, North Korea, and Vietnam designate the supreme executive and administrative organ as an internal organ of the supreme state organ of power. The Cuban state follows the Soviet tradition, and describes the government as a constitutive organ of the unified state apparatus.

== Name ==
The supreme executive and administrative organs are most commonly given the name "Council of Ministers". Albeit, in Czechoslovakia it was known as the government, while it was designated as the Federal Executive Council in Yugoslavia. In the existing communist states, the executive organ has a plethora of designations: as the State Council in China, as government in Laos and Vietnam, as the Council of Ministers in Cuba, and as the Cabinet in North Korea. The head of the organ is the equivalent of a prime minister in non-communist states.

== Powers ==
=== Accountability ===
Per unified power, the executive organ is subordinate to the supreme state organ of power. Most accountability work is transferred to the permanent organ of the supreme state organ of power. However, in reality, since the establishment of the first communist state in Russia, the executive organ has been more powerful than the supreme state organ of power, according to scholar Georg Brunner. Across most communist states, the most powerful state organ is the executive organ. In cases where it is not, the permanent organ most often acts as the most powerful state organ. The reason for its preeminent position is that the executive organ is responsible for the state administrative structures, meaning ministries, departments, and other administrative units. In certain cases, the executive organ developed from being a mere administrative decision coordinator to its prime instigator.

=== Internal organization ===
All minister-level officials are members of the executive organ, which is a collective decision-making organ. In between sessions of the full executive organ, powers are delegated to a standing board, either known as the presidium, as in the Soviet Union, or the executive meeting, as in China. The standing board is composed of the head of government and other senior members of the executive organ, most commonly the deputy heads of government. The standing board, like the executive organ as a whole, is formally a collective organ. Members officially make decisions collegially, but the head of government presumably dominates these organs.

=== Head of government ===
There have been cases in communist history in which the party leader concurrently served as the head of government. Vladimir Lenin served as both the party's informal leader and the executive organ's head. After his death, Alexey Rykov served as head of government until Joseph Stalin's protege, Vyacheslav Molotov, took power. At the height of his powers, Stalin concurrently served as party general secretary and head of the executive organ. Having the party leader serve concurrently as head of government was common in the late 1940s and early 1950s in communist Europe. However, this norm was eventually discarded since it was believed to centralize too much power in one person. Ever since, the norm has been that the party leader and the head of the executive organ are two distinct individuals.

=== Relationship with the communist party ===
The communist parties of communist states use their powers to control the state, either formally through the supreme state organ of power or informally, by dominating the unified state apparatus, including the assertion of political leadership over the military and security forces. That means that the highest organs of these parties, the politburo and the secretariat, usually only intervene in special cases, and let the state's executive organ mostly handle daily administrative affairs without interference.

== See also ==
- Supreme state organ of power
