= Leading role of the party =

Constitutional right of a party to rule the state

The leading role of the party is a constitutional principle of communist states. It holds that a ruling communist party leads the state by virtue of being the vanguard of the proletariat.

== Origin and Soviet constitutional presence ==
The leading role of the party was first enshrined in Article 126 of the 1936 Constitution of the Soviet Union, which described the Communist Party of the Soviet Union (CPSU) as "the vanguard of the working people in their struggle to strengthen and develop the socialist system and is the leading core of all organizations of the working people, both public and state."

Article 6 of the 1977 Constitution of the Soviet Union reiterated the role of the CPSU as the "leading and guiding force of the Soviet society". The text of the article follows in English translation.

The leading and guiding force of the Soviet society and the nucleus of its political system, of all state organisations and public organisations, is the Communist Party of the Soviet Union. The CPSU exists for the people and serves the people.

The Communist Party, armed with Marxism–Leninism, determines the general perspectives of the development of society and the course of the home and foreign policy of the USSR, directs the great constructive work of the Soviet people, and imparts a planned, systematic and theoretically substantiated character to their struggle for the victory of communism.

All party organisations shall function within the framework of the Constitution of the USSR.

== Other Communist states ==
Similar articles are or were in constitutions of many other countries. For example, the constitution of China states that "The defining feature of socialism with Chinese characteristics is the leadership of the Chinese Communist Party", while the party constitution declares the party to be the "highest force for political leadership".

In Communist states where other parties are nominally allowed to exist, those parties were largely subservient to the Communists, and were required to accept the Communists' leading role as a condition of their continued existence. For example, all parties in East Germany were part of the National Front, dominated by the Communist Socialist Unity Party.

== 1990 amendment under Gorbachev ==
On 15 March 1990 Article 6 was amended by the 3rd Extraordinary Congress of People's Deputies of the Soviet Union, to read as follows:

The Communist Party of the Soviet Union, other political parties as well as labor, youth and other public organisations and mass movements, through their representatives elected to the Councils of People's Deputies and in other forms participate in the policy-making of the Soviet state, in the management of state and public affairs.

This move was introduced by Mikhail Gorbachev in tandem with the creation of the office of the president of the USSR (which he viewed largely as an office for himself), and as a means to formalize the transition to a multi-party political system. After the amending of Article 6 of the Constitution, the CPSU effectively lost its right to rule the Soviet Union's government apparatus; paving the way towards a multi-party democracy.

== See also ==
- Co-optation strategy of the Chinese Communist Party
