= Permanent organ of the supreme state organ of power =

State organ in communist states

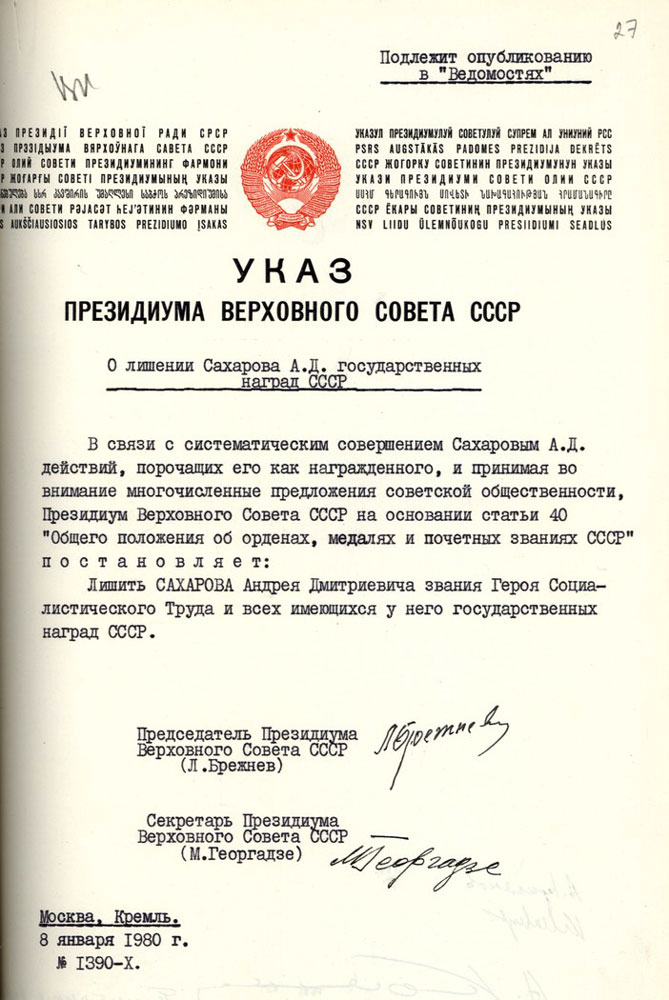
A decree issued by the Soviet permanent organ, the Presidium of the All-Union Supreme Soviet.

The permanent organ (Note: This organ has been given a myriad of designations in different communist states, such as: permanent body of the supreme state organ of power, standing organ of the supreme state organ of power, standing body of the supreme state organ of power, supreme continuously functioning organ of state power (Bulgaria), and; supreme state organ of power in permanent session (Albania and Romania).) is elected at the constitutive session of a new electoral term of the supreme state organ of power (SSOP), which holds the unified powers of the state. Since the supreme state organ of power only convenes for a few days each year, most of its duties are delegated to its permanent organ, which can meet up to several times a month. The most common names given to these organs are Standing Committee, Presidium, State Council, and Council of State. In most cases, the permanent organ of the supreme state organ of power was designated as the collective head of state. In some countries, such as in the Socialist Republic of Romania and the People's Republic of Angola, the state president as head of state served ex officio as chairman of the permanent organ.

== Origins ==
The communist state constitutions identify the national representative organs, known as the state organs of power, as the institutional embodiment of popular sovereignty. At the same time, these constitutions also stressed the supremacy and unlimited state powers of the highest organ of the state, known as the supreme state organ of power (SSOP), which delegated these state powers to other more specialised state organs per the Marxist–Leninist concept of the division of labour. While lower-level state organs of power were representative, they exercised competencies only within limits delegated by laws adopted by the SSOP. The doctrine of kompetenz-kompetenz meant that only the SSOP could define the jurisdiction of others. Powers that were exclusive to the SSOP typically included adopting or amending the constitution, approving national economic plans, passing the state budget, and creating or dissolving state organs. This ensured the formal concentration of sovereignty at the top.

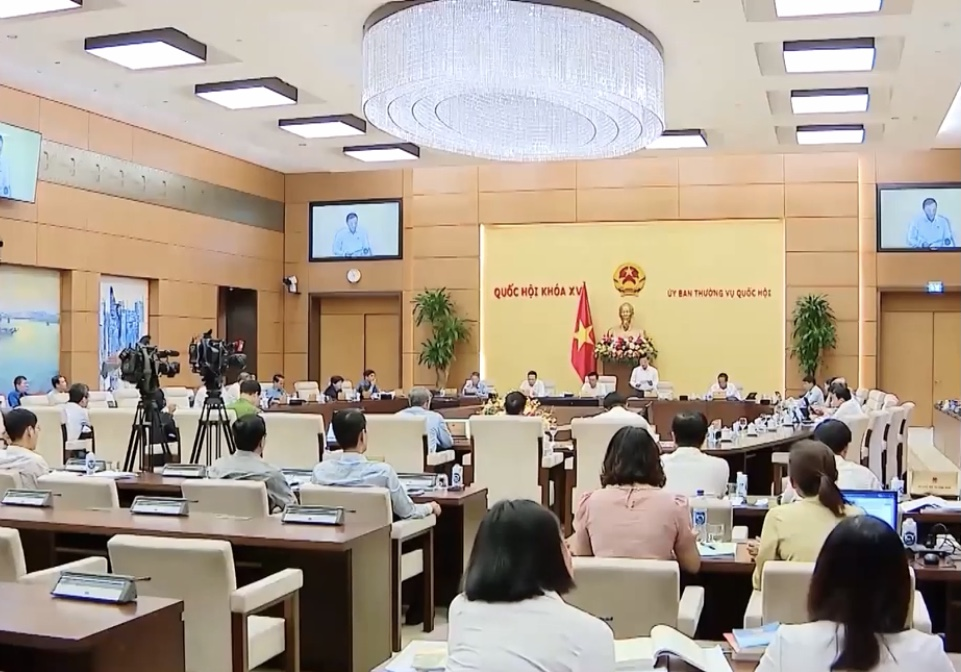
A meeting of the 15th National Assembly of Vietnam's Standing Committee. In the Vietnamese SSOP, the Standing Committee has high legislative authority when the general assembly is not convened.

However, communist states normally convened the SSOP once, twice or three times a year. These sessions usually lasted only a couple of days. To guarantee continuity of governance, communist state constitutions established permanent organs that could act in the name of the SSOP between its sessions. The most common names given to these organs are Standing Committee, Presidium, State Council, and Council of State. The most influential historical example is the Presidium of the Supreme Soviet of the Soviet Union, while the best present-day example is the Standing Committee of China's National People's Congress.

== Duties and responsibilities ==
=== Accountability and delegations of power ===
The powers of the permanent organs were difficult to theoretically legitimise, considering that communist state constitutions emphasised that popular sovereignty was indivisible and resided only in the SSOP. Despite that, permanent organs wielded sovereign-like powers on a daily basis. This contradiction was resolved by legal theorists through the doctrine that permanent organs merely exercised delegated powers and remained accountable to the supreme organ. Theoretically, the supreme state organ of power could remove the entirety of the permanent organ or change its composition as it pleased. Critics, however, argued that the concentration of authority in these organs was at the expense of the SSOP. The establishment of permanent organs in every communist state demonstrated that they were seen as indispensable to maintaining continuous governance by the ruling elites. Yet their prominence also revealed the tension in communist constitutionalism between formal representative supremacy of the SSOP and reality. Permanent organs were designed as stopgaps, but often became dominant state organs in their own right. They are a key feature of communist governance, and embody the attempt to reconcile the sovereignty of the SSOP with the need for continuous administration, but in practice, often concentrated authority and reinforced party control.

Regarding the accountability of permanent organs to the SSOP, there are differences between communist states. For example, Czechoslovakia pursued a more limited approach with the Presidium of the Federal Assembly. Although this organ could issue statutory orders and convene sessions of the SSOP, its powers were more circumscribed, since its decrees required subsequent approval by the Czechoslovak SSOP. In contrast, in Romania, the Council of State created by the 1965 Constitution was empowered to act on behalf of the Grand National Assembly, Romania's SSOP, in defense, foreign affairs, and supervision of the unified state apparatus, and it issued decrees with full legal authority. In reality, it often initiated policies rather than merely endorsing assembly decisions, reflecting the broader pattern of permanent organs becoming loci of real political power. This highlighted an important variation: some states sought to maintain the primacy of SSOP by restraining permanent organs, while others allowed them wide autonomy.

One common feature, however, was the close integration of the permanent organs with the ruling communist party. Because they operated continuously, these organs provided channels through which party directives could be rapidly transformed into legal acts. This made permanent organs important instruments of party control. While formally accountable to the SSOP, in practice, they acted as mechanisms for implementing party policy between legislative sessions. Meaning that the permanent organ remained firmly under the party's control.

=== Delegation of powers ===
==== In theory ====
Theoretically, the delegation of powers to the permanent organs was legitimised by two notions. The first related to states of emergency: efforts were made to establish an organ closely linked to the SSOP that could constitutionally act as the head of state during crises. Such organs were designed to maximise legitimacy, involve minimal subdelegation, and provide for a collective leadership. This aspect primarily concerned emergency governance and was less relevant to the question of everyday state governance. The second reason had to do with the convocation of the SSOP. Repeatedly discussed in communist states is the role of elected representatives, and whether they are to act as professional full-time politicians, permanently in session, or instead as part-time representatives who hold regular work between sessions. In communist states, the latter solution prevailed, necessitating the establishment of permanent organs with broad powers. Without them, the SSOP would theoretically face such an extensive workload that it could only process cases formally.

==== In practice ====
For example, Article 24 of the 1978 Constitution of China identified the Standing Committee of the National People's Congress as the legislature's permanent organ, granting it broad though not unlimited deputising powers. Similarly, the 1960 North Vietnamese Constitution established the Standing Committee of the National Assembly as its permanent organ. The 1972 Constitution of North Korea declared the Standing Committee of the Supreme People's Assembly to be its standing organ, while Article 33 of the Mongolian Constitution made the same designation for the Presidium of the Great People's Hural. The situation in the European communist states was less uniform. In several countries, the office of the president was not replaced by a collective head of state, for example, upon establishing the communist system. This was the case with Czechoslovakia. Yugoslavia and Romania established a presidency later. In response to concerns about over-centralisation, some constitutions eventually curtailed the powers of permanent organs to preserve the SSOP's power. At the same time, other constitutions continued to grant these organs general jurisdiction over the SSOP's area of responsibility.

In Czechoslovakia, the president was mostly bestowed with ceremonial powers. The SSOP, the Federal Assembly, delegated most of its powers to the Presidium of the Federal Assembly. A few powers were not delegated, and these were electing the president, adopting a constitution, and, except in emergencies, approving the budget, declaring war, or voting no confidence in the government. All measures taken by the Presidium under the authority of the Federal Assembly required subsequent approval by the Assembly itself, or else they would lapse. The Presidium could also issue legislative decrees, though these required the signatures of the president, the president of the Federal Assembly, and the prime minister—an arrangement intended to guarantee oversight. The result was a parallel structure in which both the presidency and the permanent organ functioned side by side.

Yugoslavia developed a different arrangement in its 1974 Constitution, which created a dual head-of-state system consisting of the Presidency of the Socialist Federal Republic of Yugoslavia and the President of the Republic. Neither, however, was granted general delegated powers. In times of war or imminent threat, the Presidency could issue law decrees, either on its own initiative or at the proposal of the Federal Executive Council, but these had to be submitted to the Assembly for approval at the earliest possible session. If the Presidency could not convene, the president was empowered to issue decrees under the same conditions. In Yugoslavia, therefore, the delegation of powers was constitutionally permitted only in emergencies—a recognition that even systems without a formal permanent organ required such mechanisms under extraordinary circumstances.

The State Council of East Germany held, like the Soviet Presidium, wide-ranging powers: it could issue decrees, ratify international treaties, and supervise lower-level councils. China developed the most expansive model with the Standing Committee of the National People’s Congress. Empowered to interpret laws, supervise the government and courts, and even enact most statutes, the Standing Committee evolved into one of the most powerful organs in the Chinese state.

== Officeholders ==
=== Head ===
When he was not concurrently designated as head of state, the chair of a permanent organ had no distinct powers other than chairing the sessions. Unlike common practice with a head of state in semi-presidential and presidential democracies, the permanent organ chair could not veto the supreme state organ of power or dissolve it. Laws adopted by the supreme state organ of power and its permanent organ had to be promulgated, in the Soviet Union at least, through a signature by the permanent organ chair. However, in practice, the chair of the permanent organ was treated by foreign states as the head of state since the officeholder often was sent on missions to represent the state abroad.

=== Members ===
To be eligible for election to a permanent organ, one must already be a member of the supreme state organ of power. As part of the delegation of power, the permanent organs holds legislative powers, such as issuing decrees, representing the state abroad, interpreting the laws, organising national elections, convoking the sessions of the supreme state organ of power, holding referendums, adopting treaties, appointing and recalling diplomatic representatives, and representing the supreme state organ of power when it is not in session. While it's officially accountable to the sessions of the supreme state organ of power, the permanent organs have usually amassed so much power that the supreme state organs of power have failed to hold them accountable.

The permanent organs of communist states share many common features. For example, the Presidium of Albania's Supreme People's Assembly was composed of a chair, two vice chairs, one secretary, and about ten members. In Bulgaria, the State Council was composed of 29 members, of which one served as chair, one as first deputy chair, three deputy chairs, and one secretary. The Hungarian People's Republic named its permanent organ the Presidential Council, and it was composed of about 21 members, of which one served as chair, two as deputy chairs and one as secretary.

In circumstances where more than one party exists, the other parties are usually represented in the membership. In some instances, they hold high-standing positions within the permanent organ. For example, Petur Tanchev as leader of the Bulgarian Agrarian National Union served as first deputy chairman. In East Germany, Gerald Götting, the leader of the Christian Democratic Union, Heinrich Homann, chairman of the National Democratic Party, and Manfred Gerlach, as leader of the Liberal Democratic Party served as deputy chairmen of the State Council. The same goes for Poland, where in 1985, were Tadeusz Młyńczak from the Alliance of Democrats and Zdzisław Tomal from the United Peasants' Party also concurrently served as deputy chairs of the State Council.
