= Lower house =

Chamber of a bicameral legislature

A lower house is the lower chamber of a bicameral legislature, where the other chamber is the upper house. Although styled as "below" the upper house, in many legislatures worldwide, the lower house has come to wield more power or otherwise exert significant political influence.

== Common attributes ==
In comparison with the upper house, lower houses frequently display certain characteristics (though they vary by jurisdiction).

=== Powers ===
In a parliamentary system, the lower house:

- In the modern era, usually has much more power, usually due to restrictions on the upper house.
  - Exceptions to this are Australia, Italy, and Romania, where the upper and lower houses have similar power.
- Is usually able to override the upper house in a variety of ways, for example the House of Representatives of Japan can override the House of councillors by a 2/3rds vote on ordinary legislation.
- Can vote a motion of no confidence against the government, and depending on the country vote for or against any proposed candidate for head of government at the beginning of the parliamentary term.

In a presidential system, the lower house generally tends to have:

- Sole power to impeach the executive; the upper house then tries the impeachment.

=== Status ===
The lower house:

- Can, in a parliamentary system, be dissolved by the executive although there are exceptions such as Norway and Hungary
- Has total or initial control over budget, supply, and monetary laws.
- Generally tends to have lower age of candidacy than the upper house (for countries with different ages of candidacy for their parliamentary chambers).
- Is more numerous than the upper house.
  - The Parliament of the United Kingdom furnishes a notable exception.

Members of the lower house:

- Are elected directly, while those of the upper house may hold their positions through direct or indirect election, appointment, or inheritance.
- tend to be elected more frequently, and all at once, not by staggered terms
- Are usually numbered in proportion to the population of their administrative divisions, unlike in the upper house although this is not a requirement

The government of the day is usually required to present its budget to the lower house, which must approve the budget. It is a widespread practice for revenue (appropriation) bills to originate in the lower house. A notable exception to this is the West Virginia House of Delegates in the United States, which allows revenue bills to originate from either house.

== Titles of lower houses ==
Many lower houses are named as follows:

- Chamber of Deputies
- Chamber of Representatives
- House of Assembly
- House of Commons
- House of Delegates
- House of the People (including Lok Sabha)
- House of Representatives
- Legislative Assembly
- National Assembly
- National Council
- Sejm/Seimas

== See also ==
- Representative democracy
- Upper house
