= Narodnyi dim =

Community hall

A narodnyi dim (Ukrainian: народний дім) is a community hall, used for cultural and social purposes by Ukrainians in Ukraine and in the Ukrainian diaspora. Narodonyi dim literally means "people's house" or "national hall". Narodni domy (plural) were modeled after the chytalni or reading halls of Austrian Galicia, many of which were coordinated by the Prosvita society.

Members of the Supreme Ruthenian Council (Ukrainian: Головна Руська Рада) started establishing these halls in the Austrian-ruled Kingdom of Galicia and Lodomeria during the "Spring of Nations" period of European history.

== Canada ==
Narodni domy in Canada typically were either governed independently or affiliated with various political or religious groups who competed for members and funds. In Alberta in the early 20th century 45% of the halls were independent, 35% were communist, and the rest were Ukrainian Catholic-controlled. Independent halls were often linked to either the "Russo-Greek Orthodox" church or the Ukrainian Orthodox Church of Canada. Socialist halls were organized by the Ukrainian Labour-Farmer Temple Association, and became known as "labour temples".

The main function of the hall's governing board (zariad) is to organize Ukrainian plays, concerts, dances, and other cultural activities.

Small narodni domy were once common throughout the Ukrainian bloc settlements but many of those have since closed, and the remaining ones tend to be in larger urban centres. Examples are:

- Ukrainian Cultural Centre of Toronto
- Ukrainian Labour Temple, Winnipeg

== Ukraine ==
The Prosvita chytalni (reading halls) survived the Ukrainian War of Independence from 1918 to 1921 and the Pacification of Ukrainians in Eastern Galicia in 1930. However, the network of these community halls was liquidated by the Soviet regime in 1939 after their annexation of West Ukraine (East Poland).

== Gallery ==
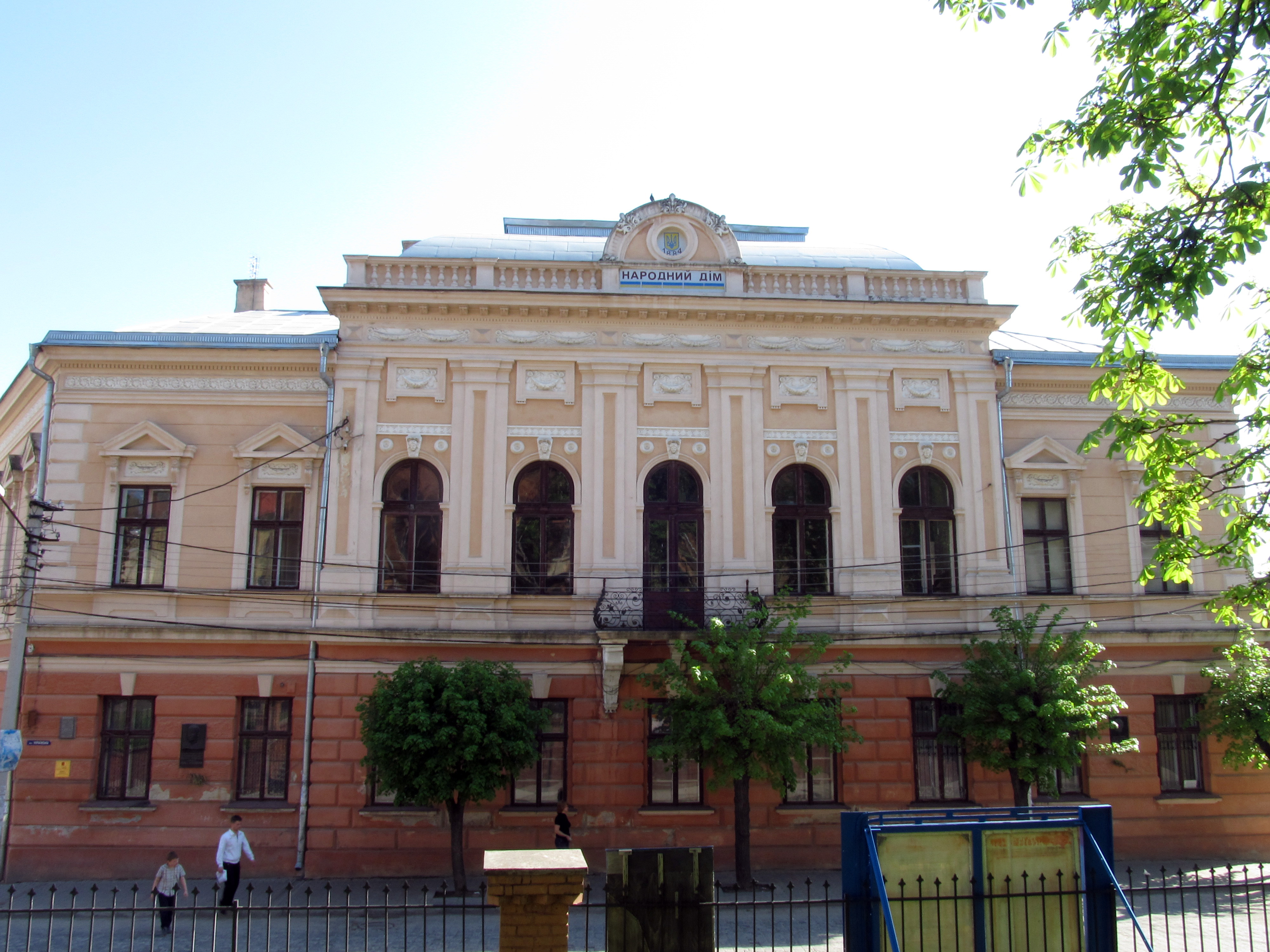
Narodnyi dim, Chernivtsi, Ukraine

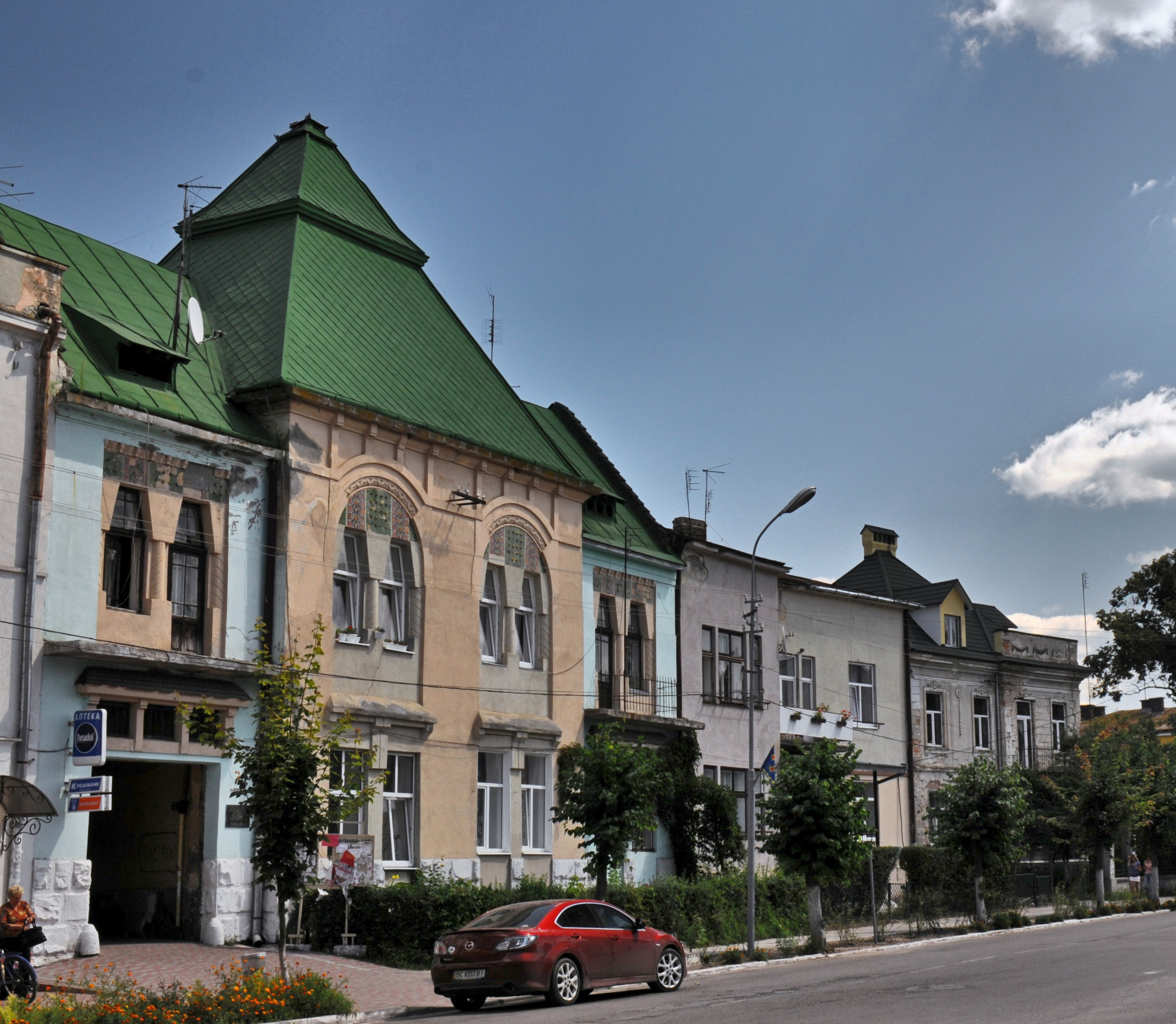
Narodnyi dim, Kamianka-Buzka, Ukraine

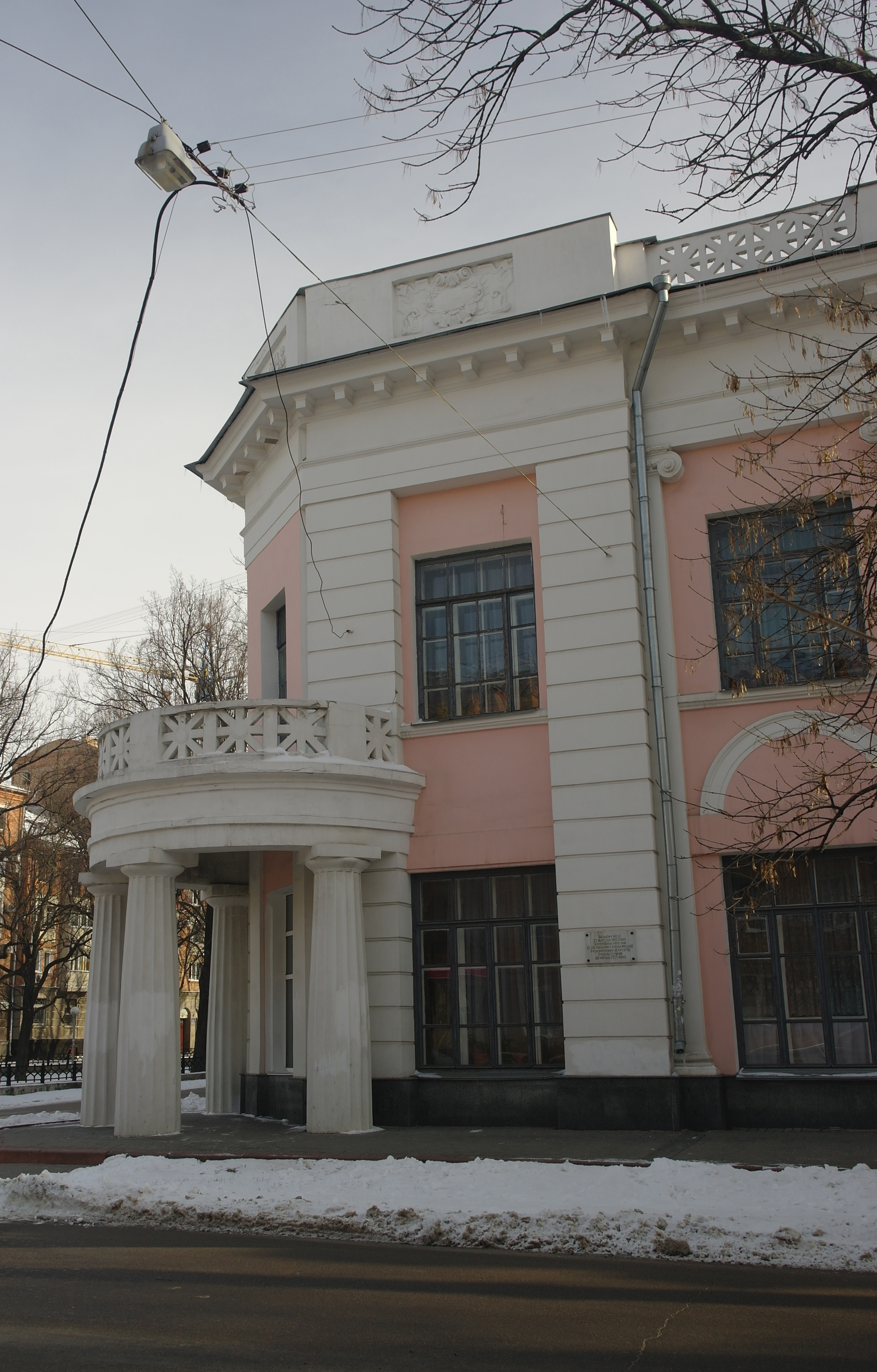
Narodnyi dim, Poltava, Ukraine

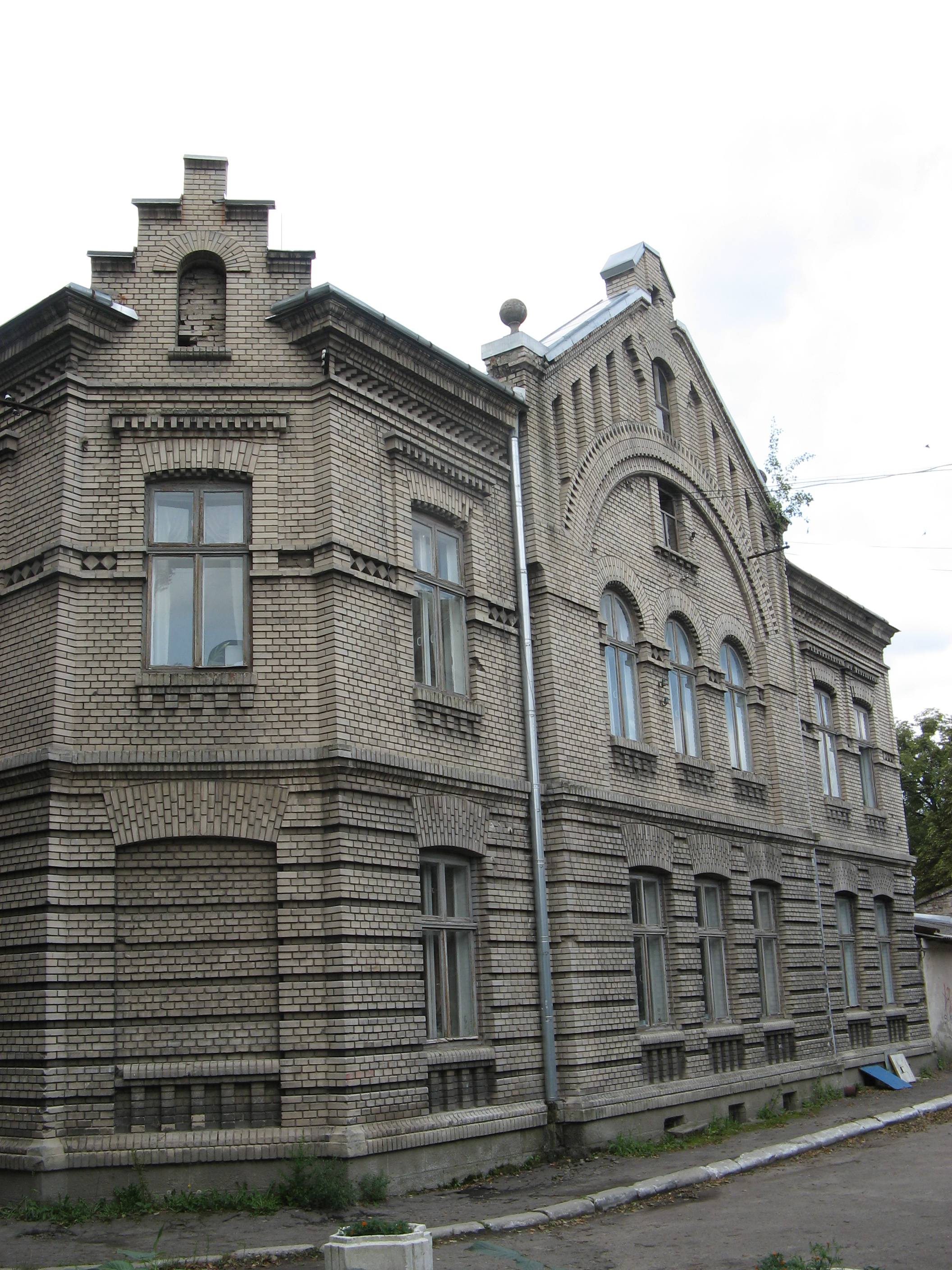
Narodnyi dim «Prosvita», Brody, Ukraine

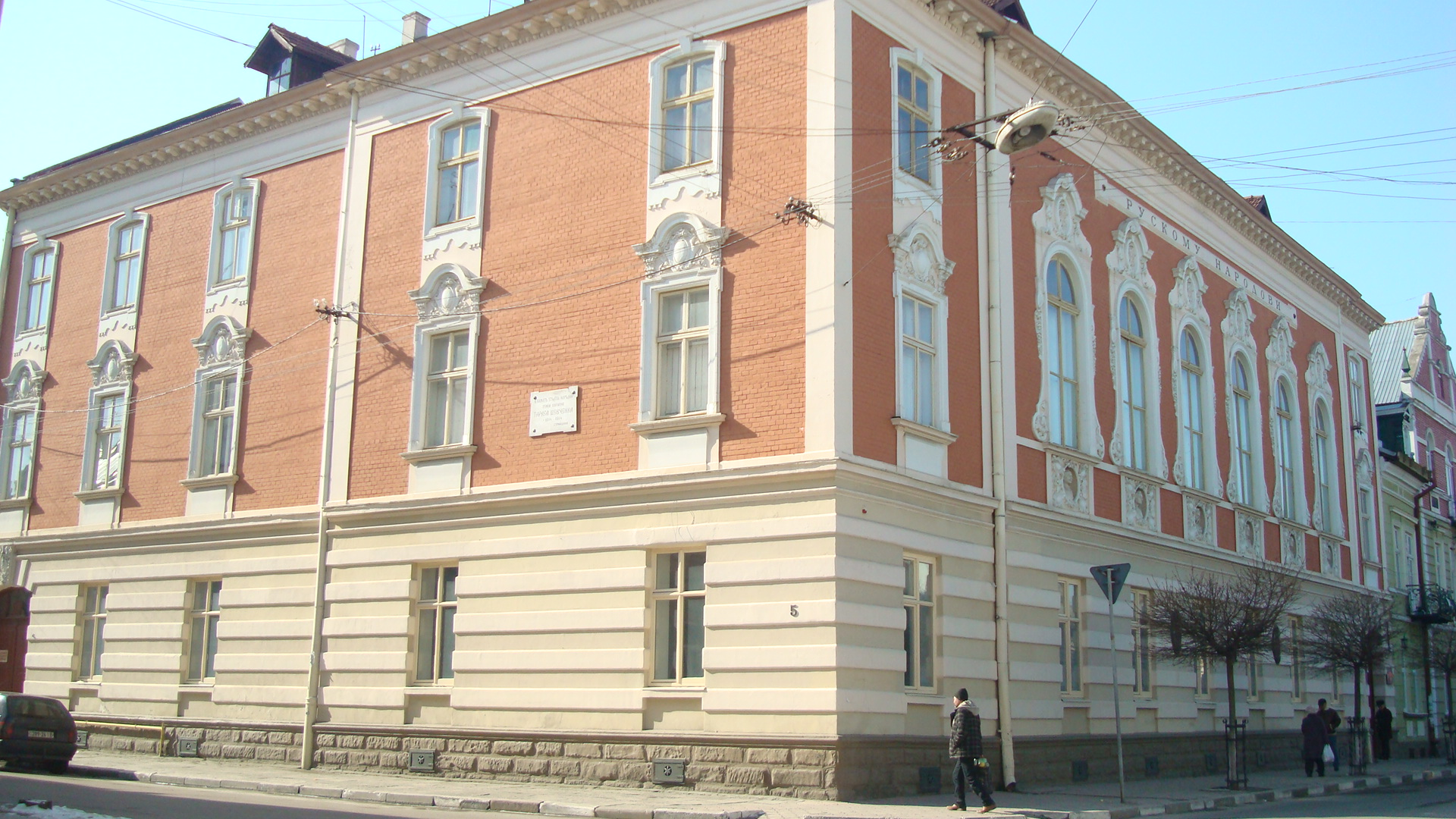
Narodnyi dim, Stryi, Ukraine

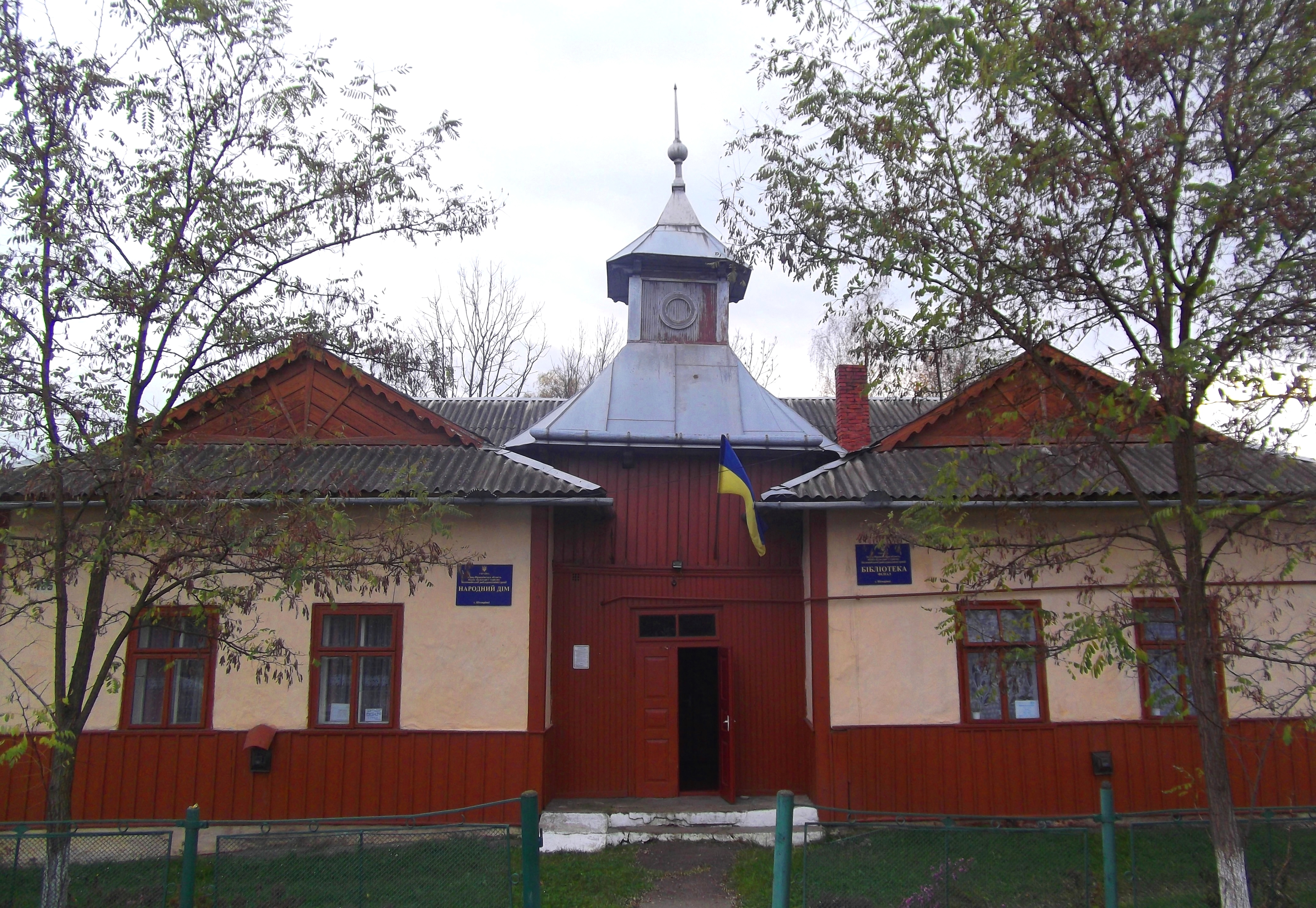
Narodnyi dim, Sheparivtsi, Ukraine

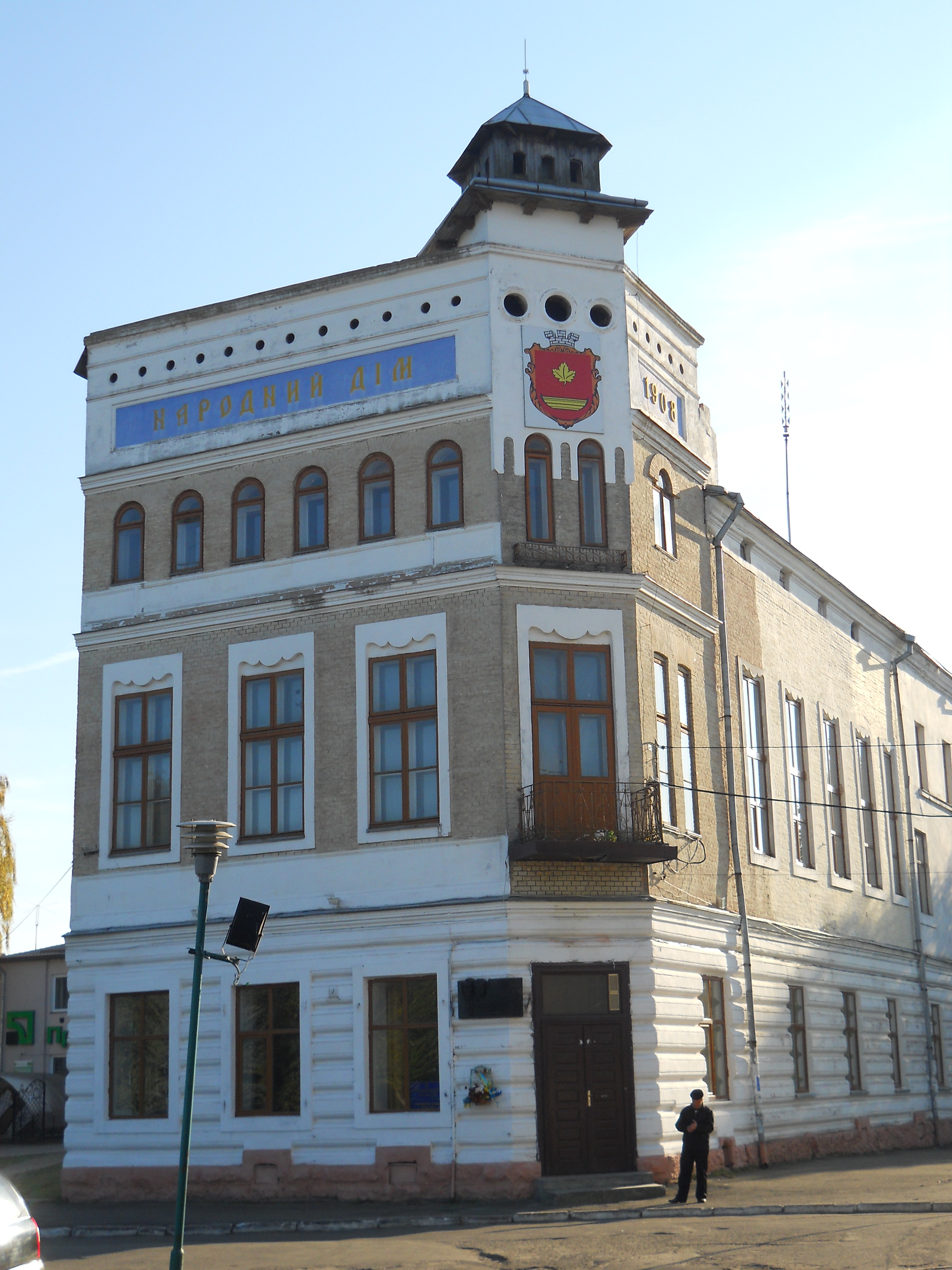
Narodnyi dim, Yavoriv, Ukraine

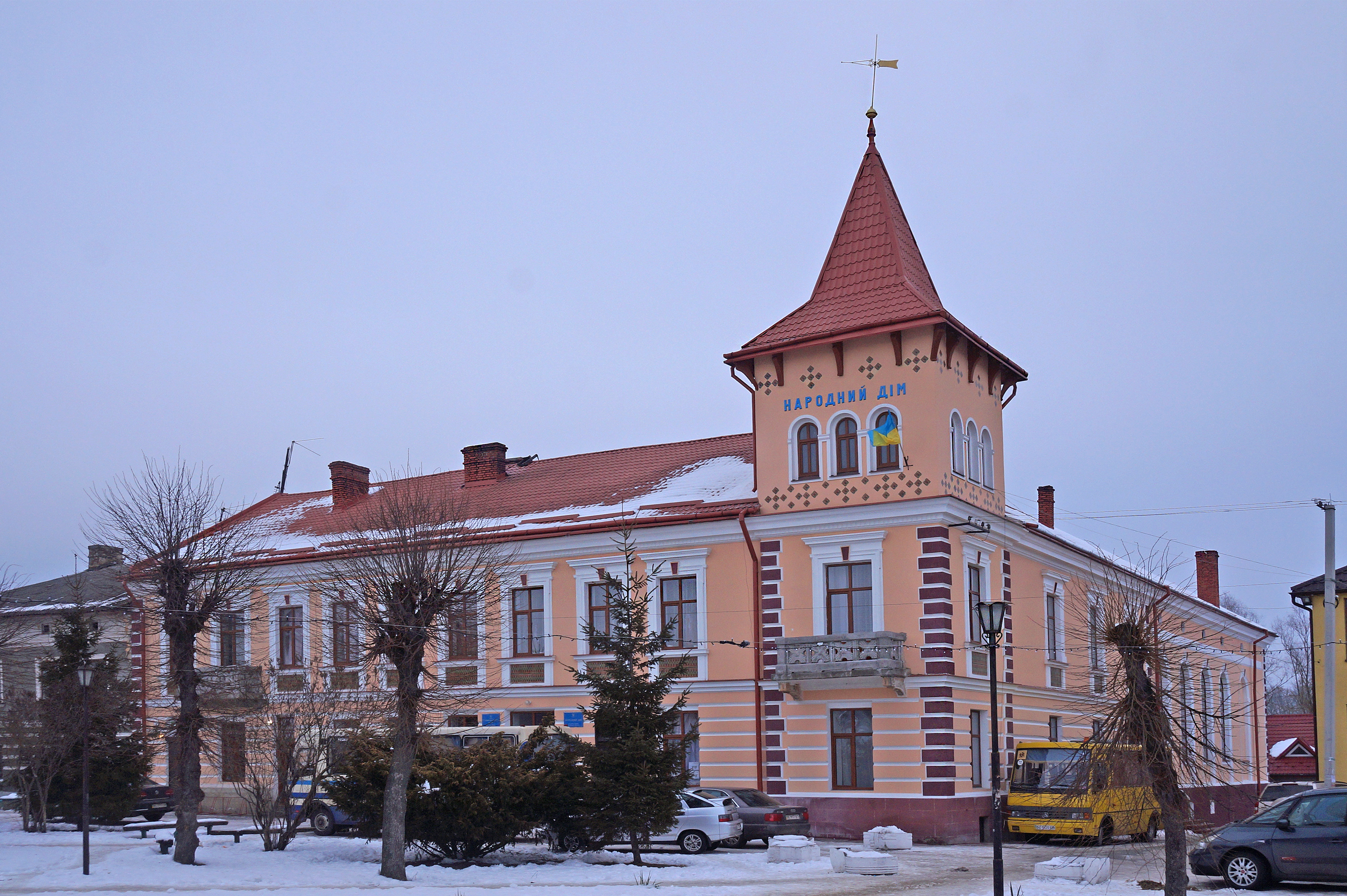
Narodnyi dim, Sudova Vyshnia, Ukraine

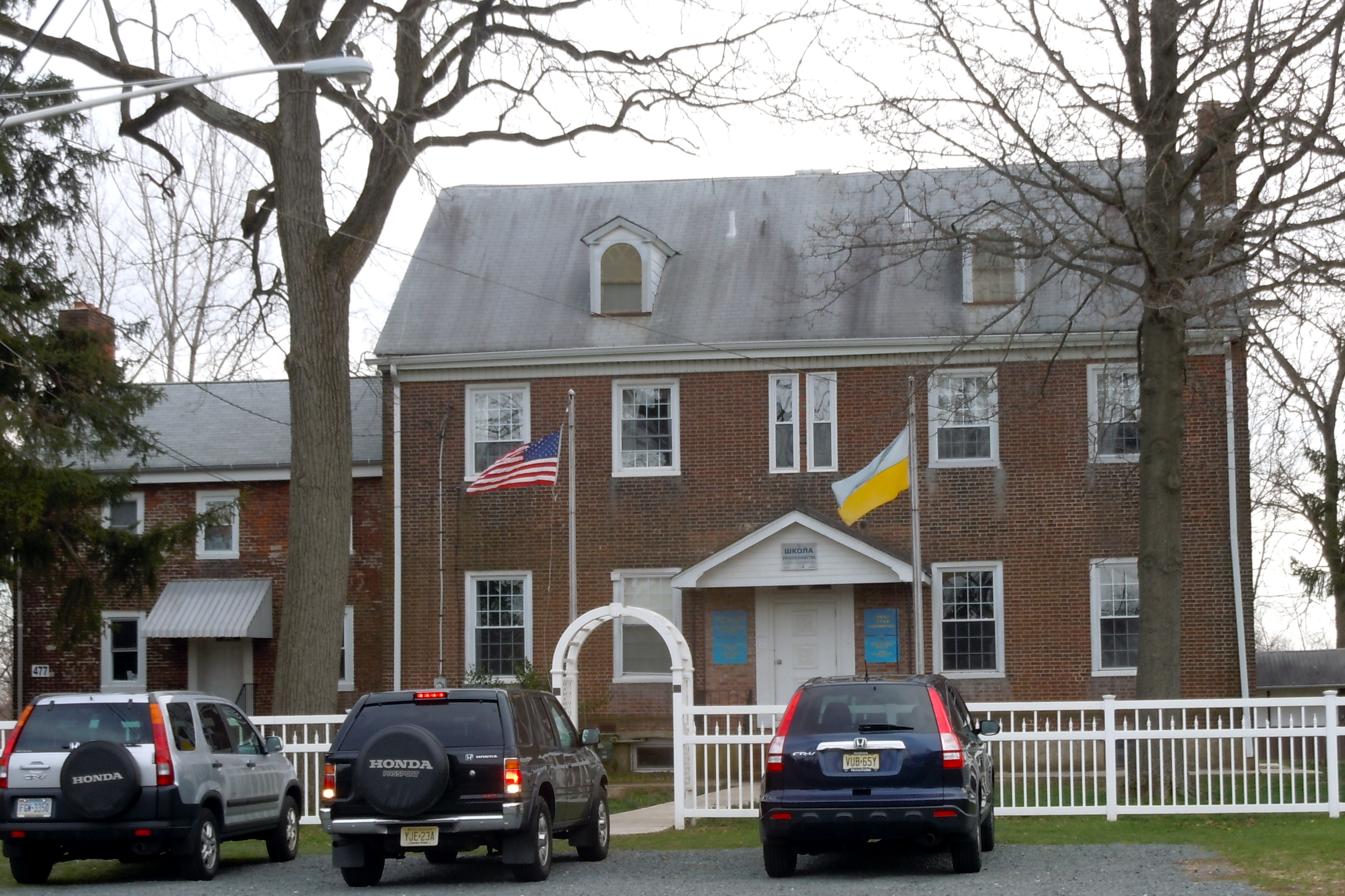
Narodnyi dim "Bow Hill", New Jersey, USA

== See also ==
- Bohemian National Home, Detroit, Michigan
- Chitalishte, the Bulgarian equivalent
- People's House (disambiguation)
- Serbski dom in Lusatia
