= Jazuli Imam Galadanci =

Nigerian politician

Jazuli Imam

Member of the House of Representatives
- Constituency: Kano state

Personal details
- Born: 1961 (age 64–65) Kano State
- Education: Bayero University
- Occupation: Politician

Jazuli Imam, originally from Kano State, Nigeria, is a politician who served as a member of the House of Representatives in the National Assembly, representing the Gwale Federal Constituency. He was elected under the platform of the All Nigeria Peoples Party (ANPP) and served from 2003 to 2007.

== Early life and education ==
Jazuli Imam was born in September 1961 in Kano State, Nigeria. He holds a Master of Business Administration (MBA) degree from Bayero University.

== Career ==
Imam was preceded by Hausawa Aminu Ghali in 2003 and succeeded by Muhammad Bashir Galadanchi in 2011 after completing his tenure.

In 2021, he was reported to have been appointed as the Nigerian Ambassador to Kuwait.
