= Council of Representatives =

Council of Representatives may refer to:

- the Council of Representatives of Iraq, the legislature of Iraq
- the Council of Representatives of Bahrain, the lower house of the National Assembly of Bahrain

== See also ==
- House of Representatives
