= Legislature =

Deliberative assembly that makes laws

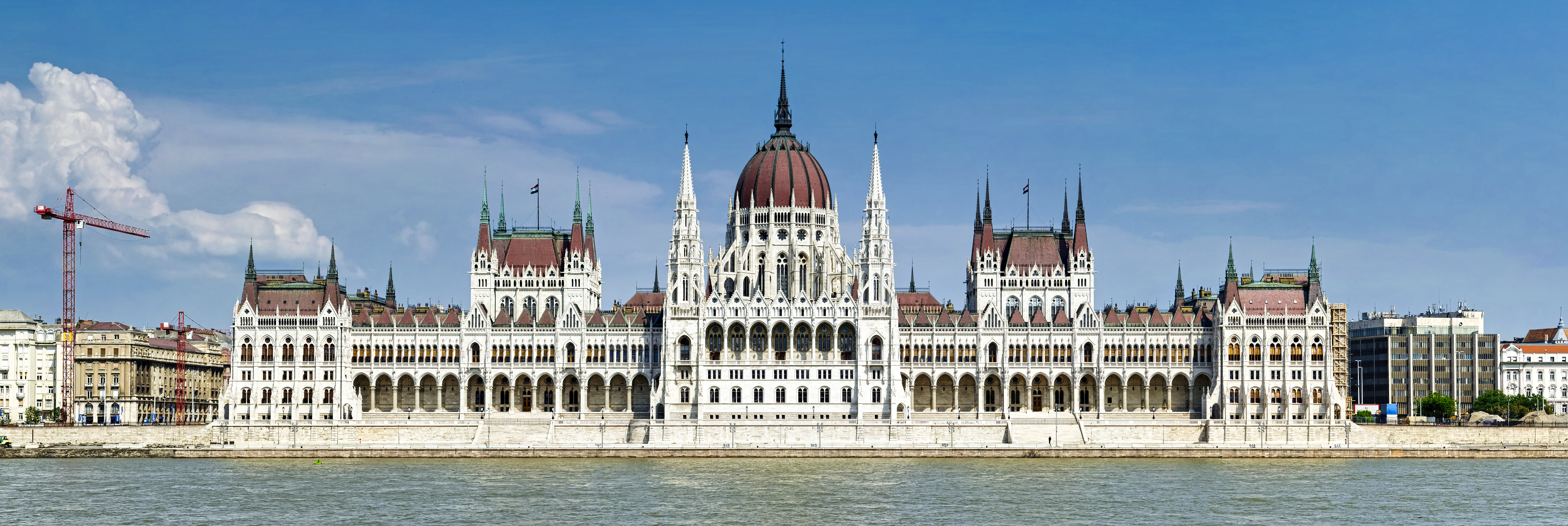
The Hungarian Parliament Building, or 'Országház', where Hungary's legislature, the National Assembly of Hungary, meets.

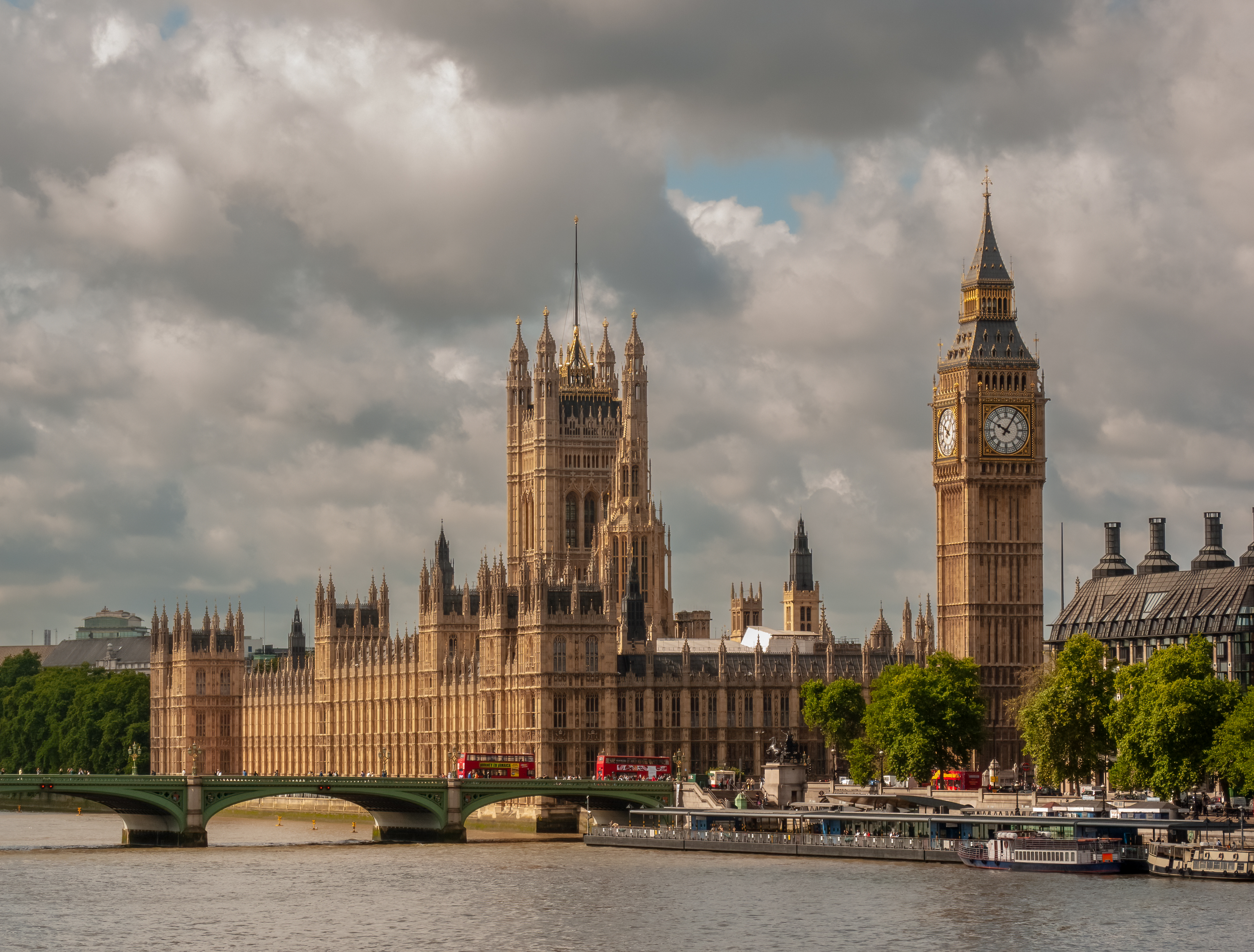
Palace of Westminster, where the legislature of the United Kingdom, the Parliament of the United Kingdom, meets.

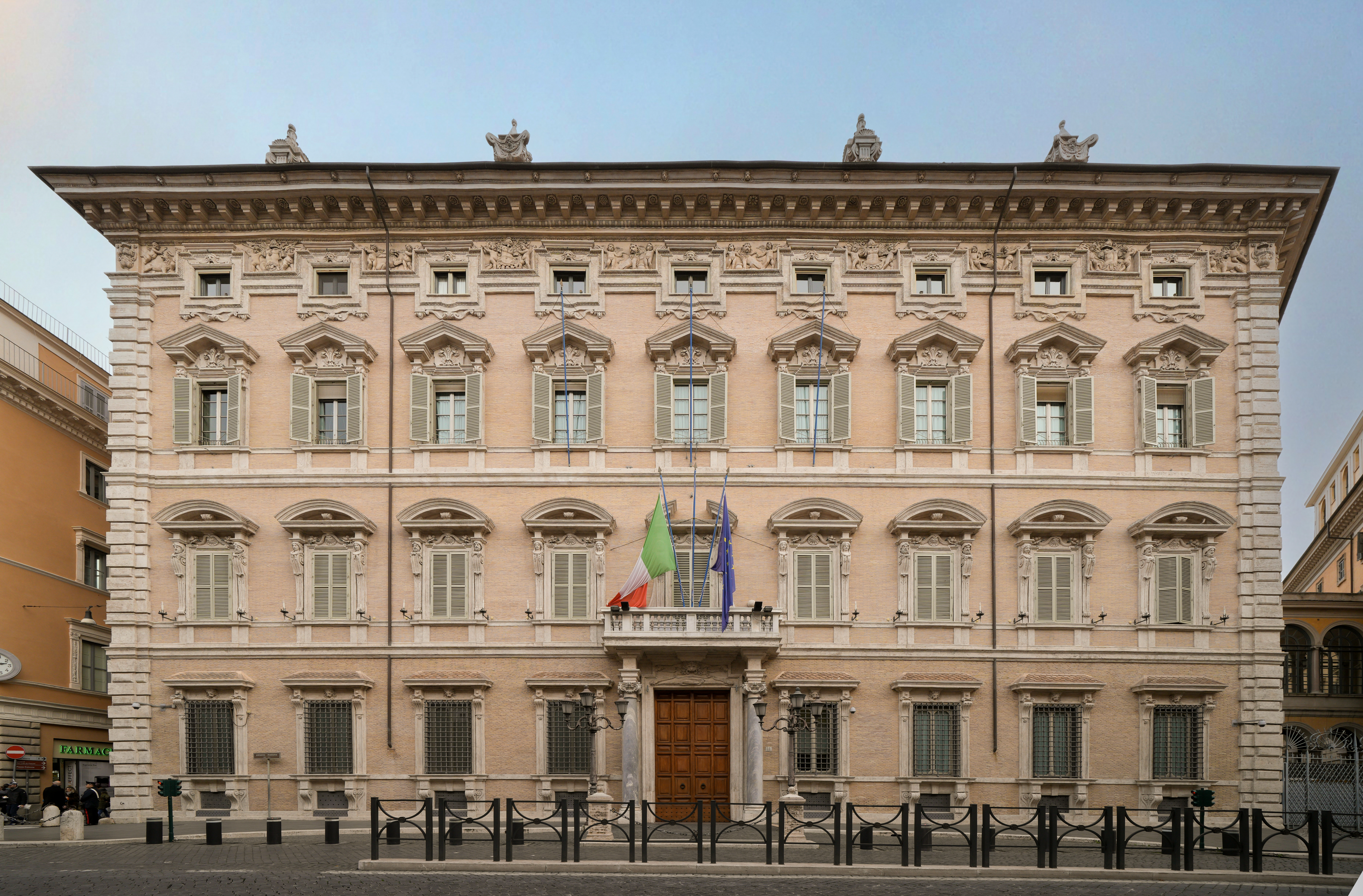
The Palazzo Madama is the seat of the upper house of the Italian Parliament, the Senate of the Republic.

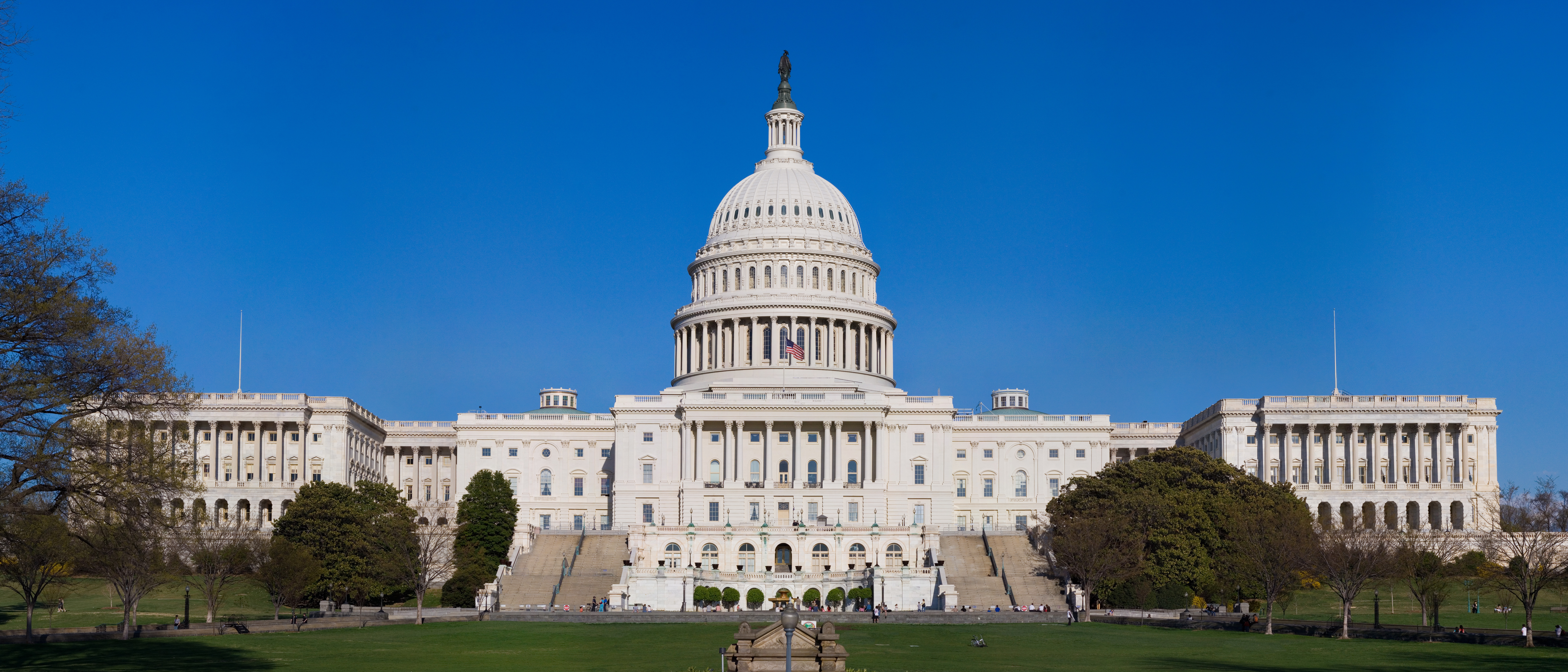
The United States Capitol, where the federal legislature of the United States, the United States Congress, meets.

A legislature (UK: /ˈlɛdʒɪslətʃər/, US: /-ˌleɪtʃər/) is a deliberative assembly that holds the legal authority to make law and exercise political oversight within a political entity such as a state, nation, or city. Legislatures are among the principal institutions of state, typically contrasted with the executive and judicial institutions. They may exist at different levels of governance—national, subnational (state, provincial, or regional), local, or supranational—such as the European Parliament.

In most political systems, the laws enacted by legislatures are referred to as primary legislation. Legislatures may also perform oversight, budgetary, and representative functions. Members of a legislature, called legislators, may be elected, indirectly chosen, or appointed, and legislatures may be unicameral, bicameral, or multicameral, depending on their constitutional design.

There are several types of legislatures, reflecting the different constitutional principles of power on which states are organized. These types illustrate how legislatures differ not only in structure and function, but also in their constitutional relationship to other state institutions and in the theories of sovereignty and power that underpin them. The most common types are parliaments, which operate under the fusion of powers between the executive and the legislature; congresses, which function under the separation of powers between independent branches of government—in these systems, the legislature is institutionally separate from the other branches and has limited means to influence their operations; and supreme state organs of power, found in communist states, which operated under the doctrine of unified power, centralizing Executive, Legislative, Judicial and all other state powers in a supreme state organ of power, with subordinate organs carrying out delegated functions within a constitutionally defined division of labour among state organs.

== Types of legislatures ==
There exist different types of legislatures. In liberal democratic systems, there exist two: parliaments and congress legislatures. Unlike parliament, there are no commonly agreed-upon terms for legislatures in non-parliamentary liberal democracies. Parliaments exist in states that practice the fusion of powers, while congresses exist in states that practice the separation of powers. There also exist other types of legislatures, such as the supreme state organs of power (SSOP) in communist states, which function within the bounds of unified power. Types of legislatures are defined by, as shown, the political power system they operate in. These power principles say something about the relationship between the legislature and other state institutions. For example, the United Kingdom's Parliament means that it practices fusion of powers, while Mexico's Congress of the Union informs that Mexico practices the separation of powers. According to scholar Amie Kreppel, the most important distinguishing feature between a type of legislature is the relationship between the legislature and the executive.

=== Parliament ===
In liberal democratic states that practice parliamentary democracy, the government in the form of the prime minister and the cabinet is elected by the legislature. The members of the government are elected from within the membership of parliament. Additionally, although an institutionally distinct organ, the government is accountable to parliament. Meaning that, theoretically, the legislature can remove the government as it sees fit, regardless of electoral outcomes. However, the removal of a government by the legislature can lead to early elections and result in both losing power in the coming election. Therefore, the relationship between the legislature and government in a parliamentary democracy is characterised by mutual dependence.

=== Congress ===
The boundaries between government branches are clearly demarcated in separation of powers systems. In contrast to parliamentary systems, in separation of powers systems, the head of state and head of government are merged into an executive branch in the office of president. Also, to clarify the institutional boundary even further, the president and the congressional legislature are elected in separate elections. For these reasons, the ability of congress to remove the executive is limited. It can instigate, as in the United States, an impeachment of the executive, but that is considered to be a move only taken in the utmost extreme circumstances.

=== Supreme state organ of power ===
Communist states established SSOPs, and formally speaking, these organs are the most powerful state institutions in the respective country. Since it's a holder of the unified powers of the state, the SSOP is constrained only by the limits it has itself set by constitutional and legal documents it has adopted. For example, in China, according to Chinese legal scholar Zhou Fang, "[t]he powers of the National People's Congress as the [SSOP] are boundless, its authority extends to the entire territory of the country, and, if necessary, it can intervene in any matter which it finds it requisite to do so." More specifically, according to Chinese legal scholars Xu Chongde and Niu Wenzhan, "[t]he other central State organs are created by [China's SSOP] and execute the laws and resolutions made by [China's SSOP]."

According to scholar Georg Brunner, this indicates that communist constitutions codify the state's unlimited political powers, and indirectly, those of the ruling communist party. He believes this is proof that the liberal democratic conception of the rule of law is irreconcilable with communist state constitutions because they rest on opposing relationships between law and politics. Under the liberal democratic rule of law conception, political processes are constrained by legal norms supervised by an independent judiciary and are viewed as universal and non-ideological. That means that holders of political power are bound by law, and that law takes precedence over politics. By contrast, communist constitutions codify the primacy of politics over judicial authority, as judicial power is also considered a form of political power. That means that communist states formally subjugate judicial power to the political power of the SSOP (the supreme judicial organ is inferior and accountable to the SSOP). Marxist–Leninists hold that legislation, not judicial rulings, is the sole source of valid law. As a result, Marxism–Leninism rejects the separation of powers, but supports the demarcation of state responsibilities in accordance with the principle of the division of labour. Other state organs derive their powers from, and are subordinated to, the SSOP.

== Terminology ==
Map showing the terminology for each country's national legislature in English None National assembly Parliament Congress Legislative council/assembly National/supreme council House of representatives Other

The name used to refer to a legislative body varies by country.

Common names include:

- Assembly (from Old French asemblee, cf. assemble)
- Congress (from Latin congressum, "having gone together")
- Council (from Latin concilium, "calling out with, uniting")
- Diet (from Ancient Greek díaita, "lifestyle, discussion, decision")
- Estates or States (from Old French estat, "condition, state, the state")
- Parliament (from Old French parlement, "talking")
- Supreme state organ of power (as in the supreme organ of the state)

By names:

- Chamber of Deputies
- Chamber of Representatives
- House of Assembly
- House of Chiefs
- House of Representatives
- Legislative assembly
- Legislative council
- National Assembly
- Senate

By languages:

- Cortes (from Spanish cortes, "courts")
- Duma (from Russian dúma, "thought")
- Knesset (from Hebrew k'néset, "meeting")
- Majlis (from Arabic majlis, "sitting room")
- Oireachtas (From Irish airecht/oireacht, "deliberative assembly of freemen")
- Rada (from Polish rada, "'advice, decision")
- Bundestag (from German Bundestag, "federal assembly")
  - Landtag (from German Landtag, "assembly of the country")
- Sansad (from Sanskrit saṃsada, "assembly")
- Sejm (from Polish sejm, "take with, assembly")
- Soviet (from Russian sovét, "council")
- Thing (from Proto-Germanic *þingą, "meeting, matter discussed at a meeting")
  - Husting (from Old Norse húsþing, "house meeting")
- Veche (from Old East Slavic věče, "council, agreement")

Though the specific roles for each legislature differ by location, they all aim to serve the same purpose of appointing officials to represent their citizens and determine appropriate legislation for the country.

== History ==
Among the earliest recognised formal legislatures was the Athenian Ecclesia. In the Middle Ages, European monarchs would host assemblies of the nobility, which would later develop into predecessors of modern legislatures. These were often named the Estates. The oldest surviving legislature is the Icelandic Althing, founded in 930 CE.

== Functions ==
Democratic legislatures have six major functions: representation, deliberation, legislation, authorizing expenditure, making governments, and oversight.

=== Representation ===
There exist five ways that representation can be achieved in a legislature:

- Formalistically: how the rules of the legislature ensure representation of constituents;
- Symbolically: how the constituents perceive their representatives;
- Descriptively: how well the composition of the legislature matches the demographics of the wider society;
- Substantively: how well representatives actually respond to the needs of their constituents;
- Collectively: how well the representatives represent the interests of the society as a whole.

=== Deliberation ===
One of the major functions of a legislature is to discuss and debate issues of major importance to society. This activity can take place in two forms. In debating legislatures, such as the Parliament of the United Kingdom, the floor of the legislature frequently sees lively debate. In contrast, in committee-based legislatures like the United States Congress, deliberation takes place in closed committees.

=== Legislation ===
While legislatures have nominally the sole power to create laws, the substantive extent of this power depends on details of the political system. In Westminster-style legislatures the executive (composed of the cabinet) can essentially pass any laws it wants, as it usually has a majority of legislators behind it, kept in check by the party whip, while committee-based legislatures in continental Europe and those in presidential systems of the Americas have more independence in drafting and amending bills. According to the median voter theorem laws aligned with the opinion of median voters increase political responsiveness. Lobbying can influence the legislature away from the median voter preferences or increase political polarization.

=== Authorizing expenditure ===
The origins of the power of the purse which legislatures ordinarily have in passing or denying government budgets goes back to the European assemblies of nobility, which the monarchs would have to consult before raising taxes. For this power to be actually effective, the legislature should be able to amend the budget, have an effective committee system, enough time for consideration, as well as access to relevant background information.

=== Oversight ===
There are several ways in which the legislature can hold the executive branch (the administration or government) accountable. This can be done through hearings, questioning, interpellations, votes of confidence, and the formation of committees. Parliaments are usually ensured with upholding the rule of law, verifying that public funds are used accountably and efficiently as well as make government processes transparent and actions so that they can be debated by the public and its representatives.

Agora notes that parliamentary systems or political parties in which political leaders can influence or decide which members receive top jobs can lead to passivity amongst members of the party and less challenging of leadership. Agora notes that this phenomenon is acute if the election of a member is dependent on the support of political leadership.

=== Function in authoritarian regimes ===
In contrast to democratic systems, legislatures under authoritarianism are used to ensure the stability of the power structure by co-opting potential competing interests within the elites, which they achieve by:

- Providing legitimacy;
- Incorporating opponents into the system;
- Providing some representation of outside interests;
- Offering a way to recruit new members to the ruling clique;
- Being a channel through which limited grievances and concessions can be passed.

== Internal organization ==
Each chamber of the legislature consists of a number of legislators who use some form of parliamentary procedure to debate political issues and vote on proposed legislation. There must be a certain number of legislators present to carry out these activities; this is called a quorum.

Some of the responsibilities of a legislature, such as giving first consideration to newly proposed legislation, are usually delegated to committees made up of a few of the members of the chamber(s).

The members of a legislature usually represent different political parties; the members from each party generally meet as a caucus to organize their internal affairs. Legislative staff assist legislators, but can introduce political bias in the policy-making process.

== Relation to other branches of government ==
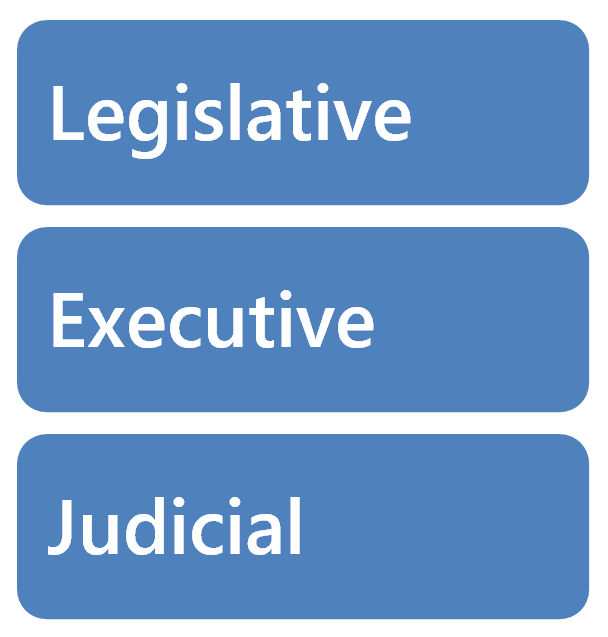
The separation of powers: legislature, executive (government) and judiciary.

Legislatures vary widely in the amount of political power they wield, compared to other political players such as judiciaries, militaries, and executives. In 2009, political scientists M. Steven Fish and Matthew Kroenig constructed a Parliamentary powers index in an attempt to quantify the different degrees of power among national legislatures. The German Bundestag, the Italian Parliament, and the Mongolian State Great Khural tied for most powerful, while Myanmar's House of Representatives and Somalia's Transitional Federal Assembly (since replaced by the Federal Parliament of Somalia) tied for least powerful.

Some political systems follow the principle of legislative supremacy, which holds that the legislature is the supreme branch of government and cannot be bound by other institutions, such as the judicial branch or a written constitution. Such a system renders the legislature more powerful.

In parliamentary and semi-presidential systems of government, the executive is responsible to the legislature, which may remove it with a vote of no confidence. On the other hand, according to the separation of powers doctrine, the legislature in a presidential system is considered an independent and coequal branch of government along with both the judiciary and the executive. Nevertheless, many presidential systems provide for the impeachment of the executive for criminal or unconstitutional behaviour.

Legislatures will sometimes delegate their legislative power to administrative or executive agencies.

== Members ==
Legislatures are made up of individual members, known as legislators, who vote on proposed laws. A legislature usually contains a fixed number of legislators; because legislatures usually meet in a specific room filled with seats for the legislators, this is often described as the number of "seats" it contains. For example, a legislature that has 100 "seats" has 100 members. By extension, an electoral district that elects a single legislator can also be described as a "seat", as, for example, in the phrases "safe seat" and "marginal seat".

After election, the members may be protected by parliamentary immunity or parliamentary privilege, either for all actions the duration of their entire term, or for just those related to their legislative duties.

== Chambers ==
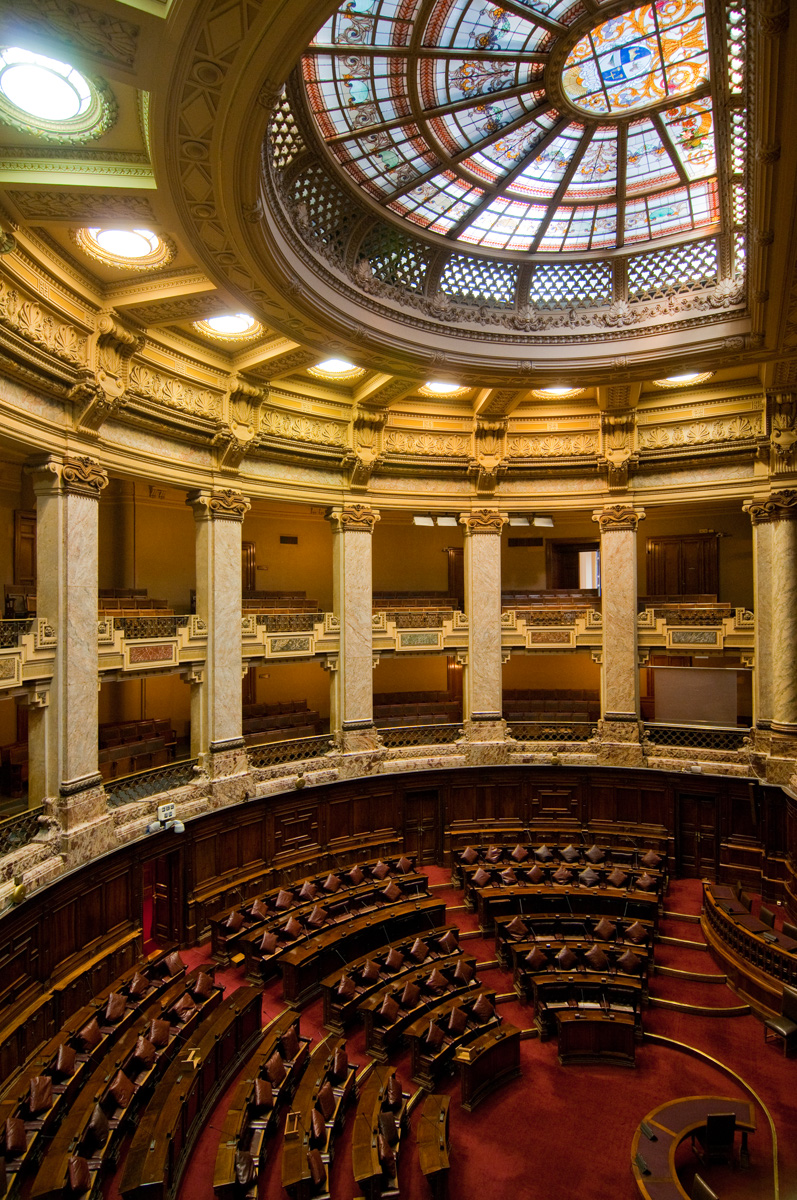
The General Assembly of Uruguay, the country's national legislature, meets in the Legislative Palace.

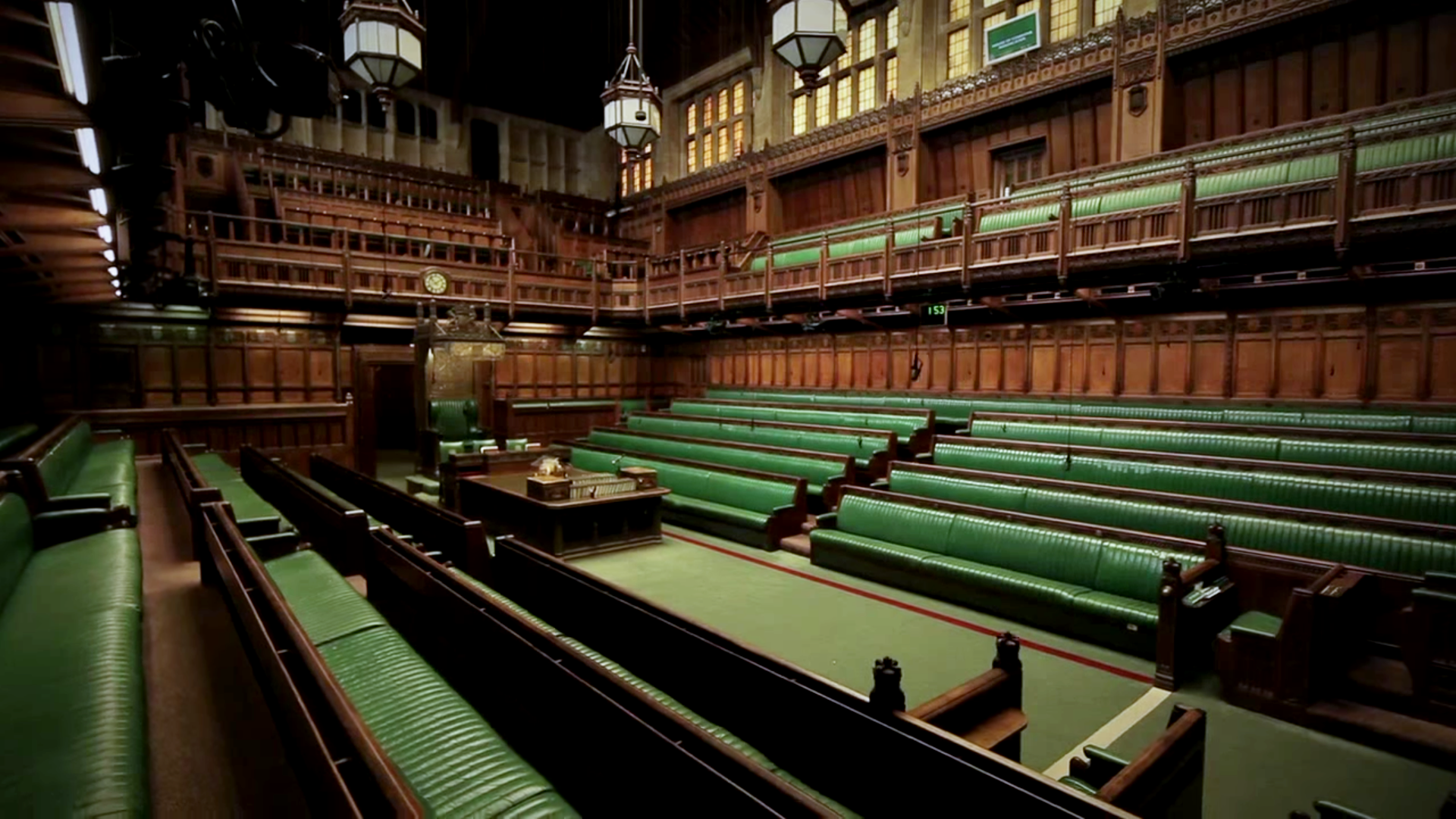
The British House of Commons, its lower house

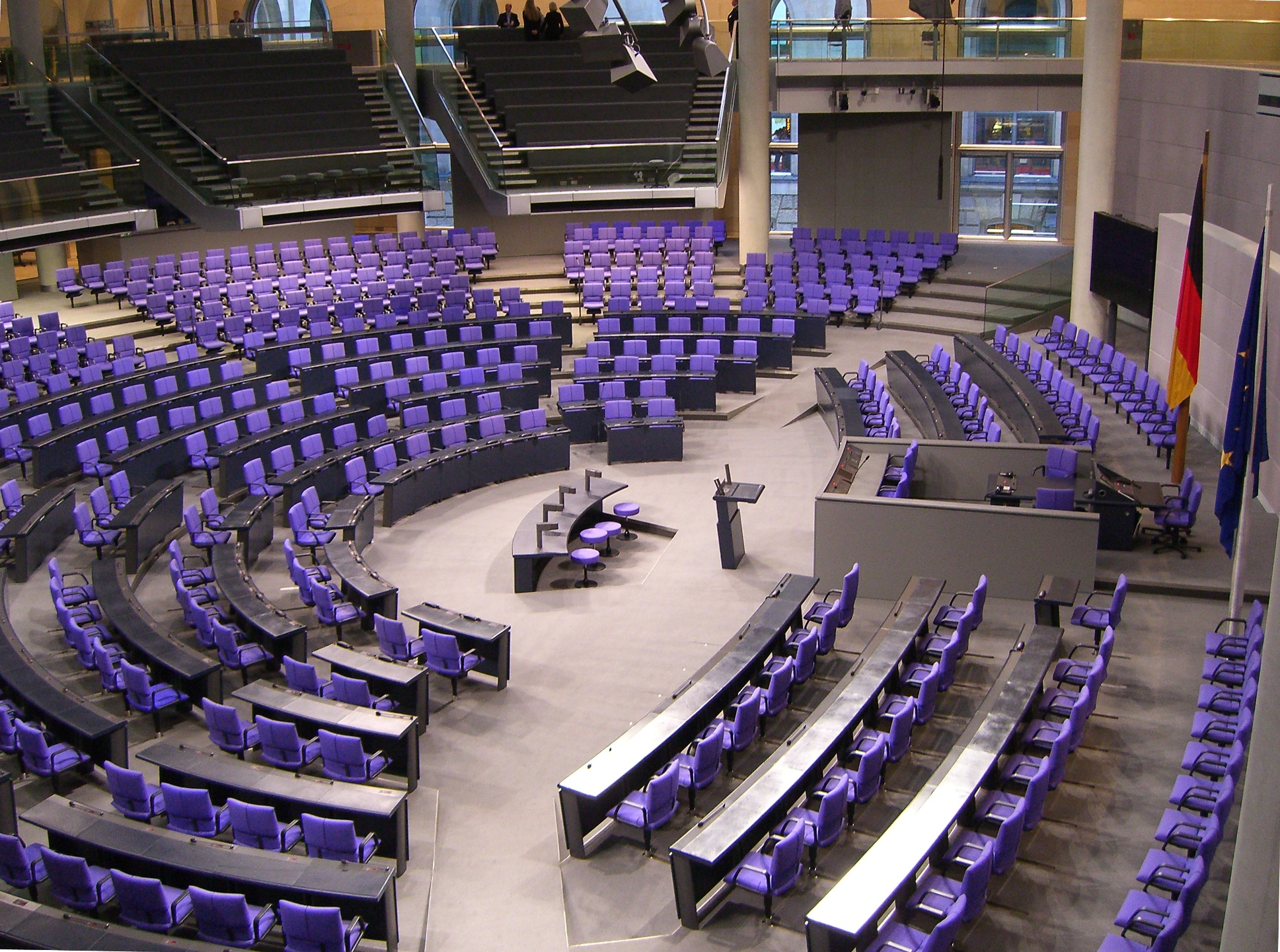
The German Bundestag, its theoretical lower house

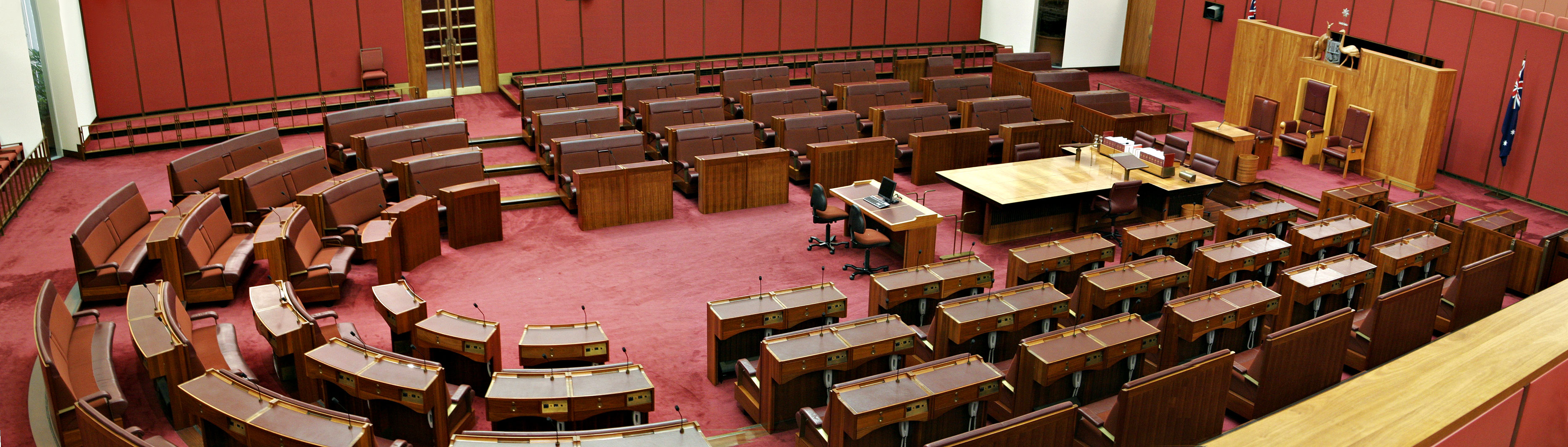
The Australian Senate, its upper house

A legislature may debate and vote upon bills as a single unit, or it may be composed of multiple separate assemblies, called by various names including legislative chambers, debate chambers, and houses, which debate and vote separately and have distinct powers. A legislature that operates as a single unit is unicameral, one divided into two chambers is bicameral, and one divided into three chambers is tricameral.

In bicameral legislatures, one chamber is usually considered the upper house, while the other is considered the lower house. The two types are not rigidly different, but members of upper houses tend to be indirectly elected or appointed rather than directly elected, tend to be allocated by administrative divisions rather than by population, and tend to have longer terms than members of the lower house. In some systems, particularly parliamentary systems, the upper house has less power and tends to have a more advisory role, but in others, particularly federal presidential systems, the upper house has equal or even greater power.

In federations, the upper house typically represents the federation's component states. This is also the case with the supranational legislature of the European Union. The upper house may either contain the delegates of state governments – as in the European Union and in Germany and, before 1913, in the United States – or be elected according to a formula that grants equal representation to states with smaller populations, as is the case in Australia and the United States since 1913.

Tricameral legislatures are rare; the Massachusetts Governor's Council still exists, but the most recent national example existed in the waning years of White-minority rule in South Africa. Tetracameral legislatures no longer exist, but they were previously used in Scandinavia. The only legislature with a number of chambers bigger than four was the Federal Assembly of Yugoslavia; initially established as a Pentacameral body in 1963, it was turned into a hexacameral body in 1967.

== Size ==
Legislatures vary widely in their size. Among national legislatures, China's National People's Congress is the largest with 2,980 members, while Vatican City's Pontifical Commission is the smallest with 7. Neither legislature is democratically elected: The Pontifical Commission members are appointed by the Pope and the National People's Congress is indirectly elected within the context of a one-party state.

Legislature size is a trade-off between efficiency and representation; the smaller the legislature, the more efficiently it can operate, but the larger the legislature, the better it can represent the political diversity of its constituents. Comparative analysis of national legislatures has found that the size of a country's lower house tends to be proportional to the cube root of its population; that is, the size of the lower house tends to increase along with population, but much more slowly.

== See also ==
- List of legislatures by country
- List of legislative buildings
- Election apportionment diagram
- Evidence-based legislation
- Supreme state organ of power
