= House of the People =

House of the People may refer to:

- House of the People (Afghanistan), the lower house of the National Assembly of Afghanistan
- Lok Sabha ("House of the People"), the lower house of the Parliament of India
- Palace of the Parliament ("House of the People"), the meeting place of the Parliament of Romania
- House of the People (Somalia), the lower house of the Federal Parliament of Somalia
- Maison du Peuple, Brussels ("House of the People"), a former building in Belgium
- Maison du Peuple (Clichy), a national heritage site in Clichy, France
- House of the People (Czechoslovakia), the lower house of the old Federal Assembly of Czechoslovakia

== See also ==
- Casa Pueblo (disambiguation)
- Council of States (disambiguation)
- People's House (disambiguation)
