= House of Commons =

Type of legislative assembly

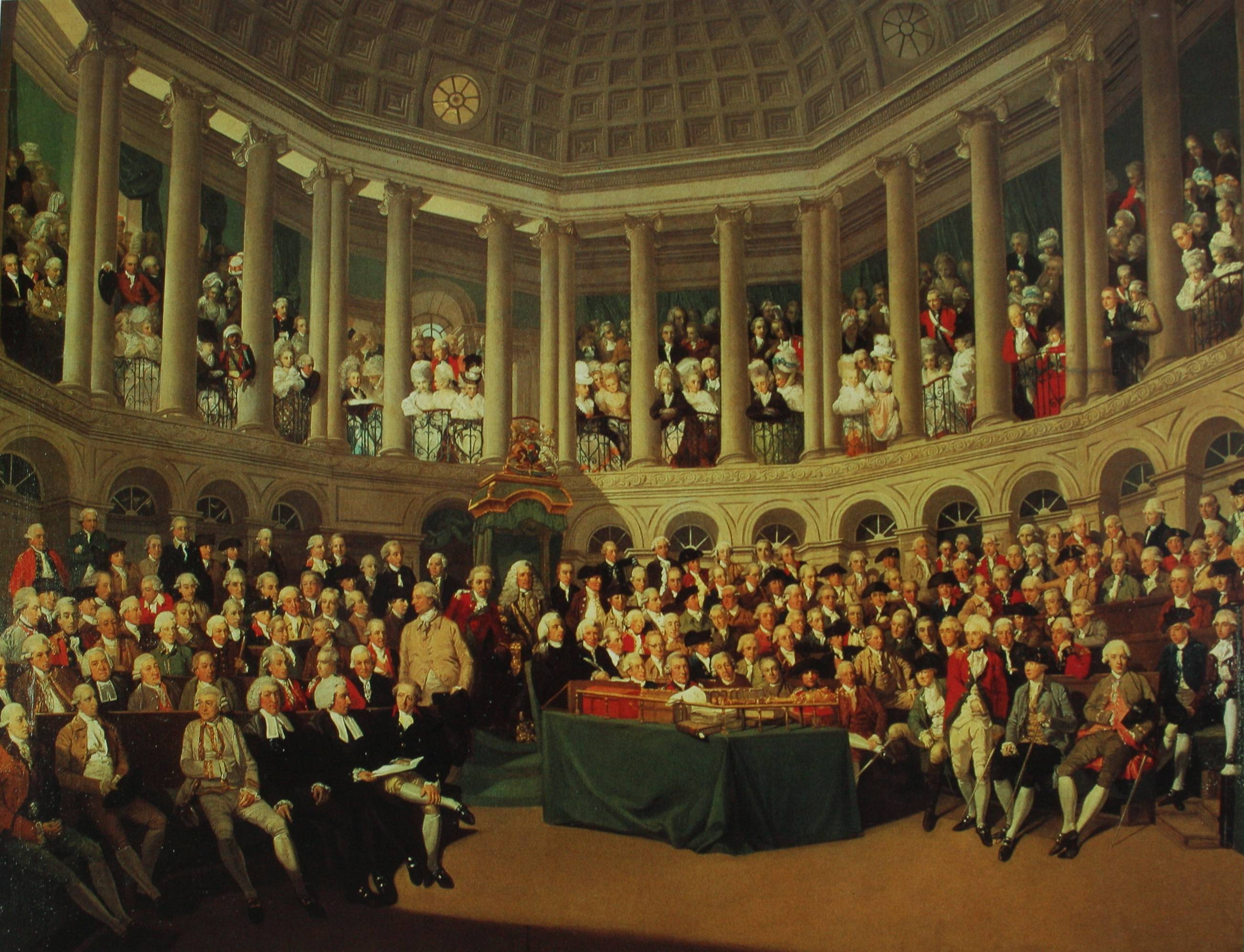
The Irish House of Commons, the first purpose-built House of Commons chamber in the world. Painted c. 1780.

The House of Commons is the name for the elected lower house of the bicameral parliaments of the United Kingdom and Canada. In both of these countries, the Commons holds much more legislative power than the upper house of parliament, which is nominally superior. The leader of the majority party in the House of Commons by convention becomes the prime minister. Other parliaments have also had a lower house called the "House of Commons".

== Specific bodies ==
=== British Isles ===
==== Westminster ====
- England: the House of Commons of England (met at the Palace of Westminster, London) sat from 1341 to 1706
- Great Britain: the House of Commons of Great Britain (at the Palace of Westminster) 1707 to 1801
- United Kingdom: the House of Commons of the United Kingdom (at the Palace of Westminster) since 1801

==== Dublin ====
- Kingdom of Ireland: House of Commons of Ireland (at various locations in Dublin: Dublin Castle, Bluecoat School, Irish Parliament House) 1297 to 1801
- Southern Ireland: House of Commons of Southern Ireland (at Government Buildings, Dublin) 1921 to 1922

==== Belfast ====
- Northern Ireland: House of Commons of Northern Ireland (at Parliament Buildings (Stormont), Belfast) 1921 to 1972

=== Canada ===
- House of Commons of Canada on Parliament Hill, in Ottawa, Ontario since 1867

=== United States ===
- The lower house of the General Assembly of North Carolina was also known as the House of Commons between 1760 and 1868, when it was renamed the House of Representatives.

== See also ==
- House of Assembly
- Legislative Assembly
- National Assembly
- Lok Sabha
- House of Representatives
- House of Lords
- General Assembly
- House of Burgesses
- State Legislature
- Legislature
- Congress
- Parliament
