= Casa pueblo =

Casa pueblo may refer to:

- Casa del pueblo (Spanish: House of the people), in Spain, this usually refers to a typical local branch office of both the PSOE and the Unión General de Trabajadores
- Casa Pueblo, a non-profit environmental watchdog community-based organization in Puerto Rico.
- Casapueblo, a citadel-sculpture in Uruguay.

== See also ==
- Pueblo de Casas Grandes, a municipality in Mexico
- House of the People (disambiguation)
- People's House (disambiguation)
