= The Furnace (magazine) =

The Furnace is a quarterly literary magazine edited by Kelli Kavanaugh and a board of editors.

== History and profile ==
The Furnace was launched September 28, 2002. Editorial offices are located at the Bohemian National Home, Tillman Avenue, in Detroit's Corktown district. It is published on a quarterly basis. The magazine covers Detroit culture, including visual arts, architecture, urban development, literature, history and music.

The Furnace has published a number of notable Detroit authors and manifestos from collectives:

- Zuriel Wolfgang Lott
- Mariela Griffor
- Architects Asylum
- Lisa Runchey
- Vievee Francis
- Joanna Karner
- Eric Darby
- Robert Fanning
- Terry Blackhawk
- Gary C. Wagaman

As a practice, the editorial team marks release of a new edition by organizing an event, often at a lost Detroit venue. For example, the editors held the first issue celebration at the Savoyard Club, in the Buhl Building at Griswold, Detroit, Michigan. Several of The Furnace's writers and a poetry editor have been a crucial part of Write Word Write Now, (a cohort of Detroit's up and coming page poets).
