= Muhammad Bashir Galadanchi =

Nigerian politician

Member of the House of Representatives
- Constituency: Kano state

Personal details
- Born: Kano State
- Occupation: Politician

Muhammad Bashir Galadanchi, from Kano State, Nigeria, is a politician who represented the Gwale Federal Constituency in the National Assembly as a member of the House of Representatives. He was elected on the Social Democratic Party (SDP) platform and served from 2011 to 2015.

== Early life ==
Galadanchi was born in Kano State, Nigeria.

== Political career ==
Galadanchi was preceded by Jazuli Imam in 2007 and succeeded by Garba Mohammed in 2015 after completing his tenure.
