= Bohemian National Home =

Building in Michigan, USA

Coordinates: 42.33278°N 83.09042°W

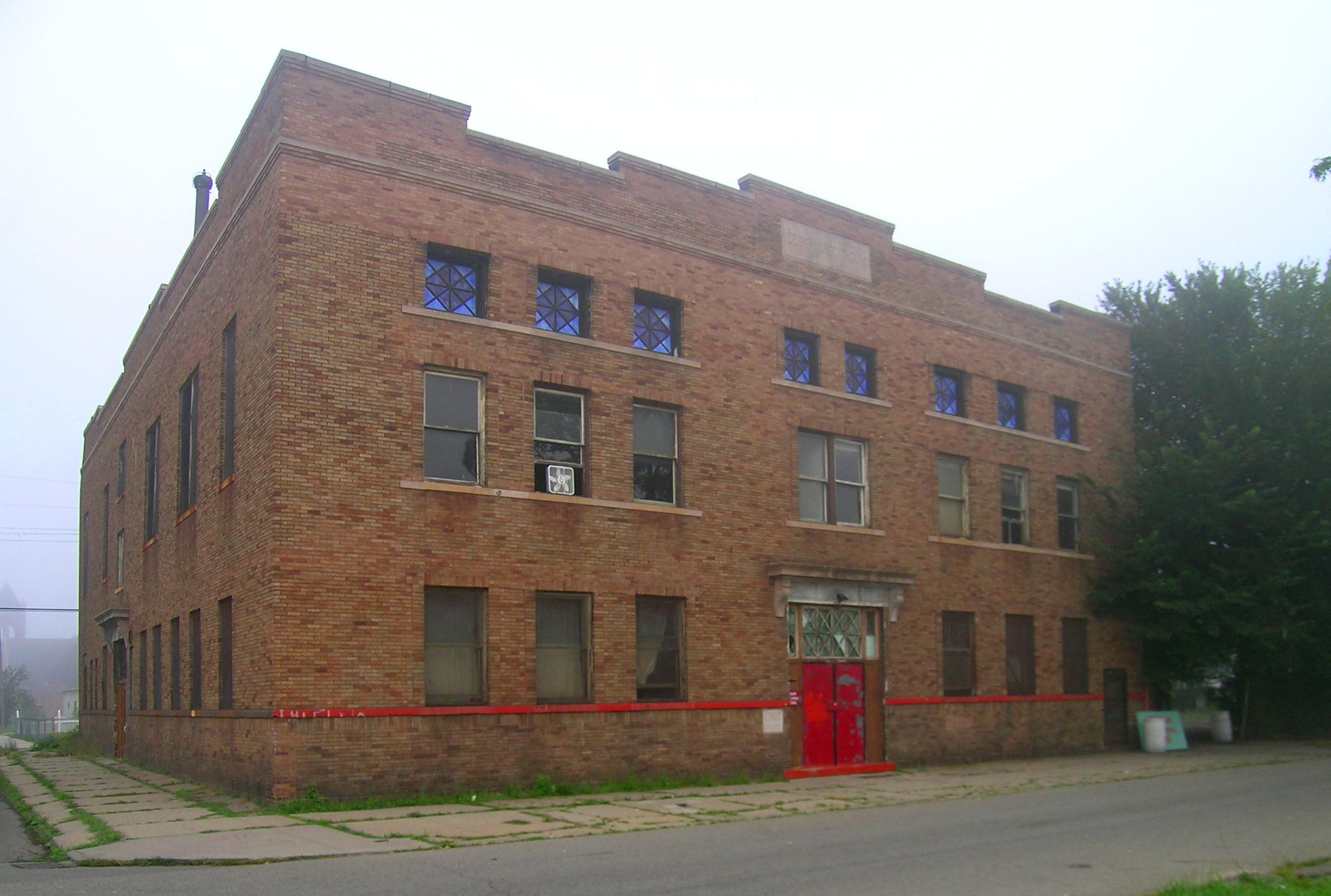
Bohemian National Home on Tillman

Bohemian National Home is a historic building in Detroit, Michigan. The brick building sits at the corner of Tillman Street and Butternut Street in the residential section adjacent to the 3000 block of Michigan Avenue. The building is an imposing presence in the neighborhood of small, late 19th-century houses and cottages, measuring seventy feet on Tillman and one hundred feet on Butternut.

== Bohemian period (1914–1962) ==
According to the building permit issued March 20, 1914, the Bohemian National Home (Cesky Norodni Dum, as written in stone on the front of the building) was built by a group called the Bohemian Society. The building's original floor plan included a full ballroom with a stage and balcony; a "green room" with an access stairwell directly to the stage; a small gymnasium with brass tie downs for gymnastic equipment; a full shower and bathroom; a full service barroom with ladies’ and men’s bathrooms; a full commercial kitchen; two multipurpose rooms; and a caretaker's apartment. Arts and Crafts references appear, most notably, in the three-panel oak doors throughout the interior of the building.

The original Bohemian immigrants came to Detroit to escape Prussian oppression and economic hardship in their homeland. A dozen recent arrivals formed the first Detroit lodge, in 1874, under the auspices of the Bohemian Society of America. This national organization first organized in 1854 in St. Louis, Missouri. The original Detroit lodge bore the name of Karel Havilicek Barovsky, a Czech hero of the 1848 revolution against the Habsburg dynasty. In 1890, the Detroit Bohemian Turners Society built Detroit's first Bohemian hall at the corner of Erskine and St. Antoine, on the near east side. A flag-bearing procession of the various Bohemian organizations who would use the facility commemorated the opening. By 1910, however, the east side hall had become too small to accommodate the growing community. The original plans for a new west side hall, and the announcement of a fund-raising drive to finance the project, appeared in the Detroit Times on August 19, 1910. The existing building at Butternut and Tillman is a scaled-down version of the $30,000, three-story building originally planned, but it proved sufficiently large to house the Bohemian community until the post World War II era. In 1962, a newly formed organization called the Detroit Lithuanian Home Association purchased the building.

== Lithuanian period (1962–1996) ==
The period from 1920 to 1950 saw very little increase in the population of Lithuanians in Detroit. In 1951, the Department of Sociology and Anthropology at Wayne State University conducted research in preparation for two international festivals at Belle Isle. The study of ethnic groups in Detroit found that the Lithuanian community still numbered about 10,000, as it had in the 1920s. The Lithuanians were still in their original three settlements, but had lost two of their original churches as they continued to move to other parts of the city. Saint Anthony on the west side was the only original church still operating in 1951, although two new churches had been built in new communities to replace the two that were lost. The American Lithuanian Choir was one of the best known choirs in the city and two radio stations continued broadcasts in Lithuanian. In sum, the Detroit Lithuanian community had survived the period of nativism and low immigration with its unique culture intact. Detroit, provided, therefore, a natural choice as a location to resettle Lithuanian immigrants displaced by World War II and the Soviet occupation of their homeland.

In early November 1953, four Lithuanian men met at the Alytaus Bar at 3415 Michigan Avenue. One of the men was the owner of the bar, Peter Podolski, who lived with his wife Rose in the apartment located above the bar. The other men were Viktoras Perminas, Joseph Kowalski and Alex Conrad, an attorney. Throughout the month, the men met regularly as they developed plans for a private Lithuanian club. The Alytaus Bar was already used as an informal Lithuanian center, helping newly arrived Lithuanians secure employment at the Star Tool and Die Company located directly behind the bar. The building adjacent to the bar was known as a "camp", providing temporary food and lodging to the displaced Lithuanians. So a more formal organization to help these immigrants adjust to American life and simultaneously, take advantage of the new energy in preserving Lithuanian culture, was a natural development in the Michigan Avenue neighborhood.

The club was dedicated to the memory of Steponas Dariaus and Stasys Gireno, two Lithuanian-American pilots who attempted a heroic flight in 1933. After successfully crossing the Atlantic Ocean from New York, the two pilots attained martyr status when they were shot down by the Germans before reaching Lithuania. On November 27, 1953, an assumed name was filed for the Dariaus and Gireno Club, or the D and G Klubas, as it was commonly known to its members. The clubs initial registered office was listed as 3417 Michigan Avenue; the apartment of the Podolskis. The constitution of the club set forth its purpose as:

- The perpetuation of Lithuanian history and language;
- The study and perpetuation of Lithuanian culture and literature;
- To engage in athletics and sports;
- To get together at intervals in diverse past times such as dancing, concerts and like and;
- To assist and give aid to Lithuanians who recently came to the USA so that they may become acquainted with the customs, habits and language of America and so that they may understand and respect the United States Government and its Constitution.

The founders of the club seemed especially concerned with the fifth purpose of the constitution and required each new member to sign a pledge form which stated that the individual did:

solemnly swear that I will support and defend the Constitution of the United States against all enemies, foreign and domestic; that I will bear true faith and allegiance to the same; that I do not advocate the overthrow of the government by force or violence; that I am not a member of any political party or organization that advocates the overthrow of the Government of the United States by force or violence; that I am not directly or indirectly affiliated with and or associated in any manner whatsoever as a member of any subversive organization as prepared and released by the Committee on Un-American Activities, US. House of Representatives, Washington, D.C. dated May 14, 1951.

These two documents make it clear that this new wave of Lithuanian immigrants was decidedly anti-Communist. Although the influence of McCarthyism was prolific in America at the time, the displaced Lithuanian immigrants had personal experience with the Soviet Communists and seemed to embrace the principles of the Committee on Un-American Activities naturally, without any urging.

There in no record of a permanent location for the Dariaus and Gireno Club, other than Michigan Avenue address, until a new organization is formed in 1962 called the Detroit Lithuanian Home Association. The new group was actually formed, according to a 1966 Annual Report, for the expressed purpose of buying a building to provide "a central home for all member organizations." The only business reported for that year, and previous years of reports, was the purchase in 1962, of the Bohemian National Hall.

Although the annual reports submitted to the government present a simplistic version of the purpose of the new organization, the Constitution and Bylaws of the group reveal more specifics. Article I of the document states:

We Lithuanians, representing numerous clubs, organizations, associations and groups desiring to promote, foster and facilitate the propagation, retention and understanding of Lithuanian culture, language and tradition for the purpose of enriching and contributing to American and Lithuanian ideals, do hereby establish the Detroit Lithuanian Home Association as a non-profit and self-supporting corporation. The association shall acquire and operate a building which shall be available to all Lithuanians and organizations loyal to the United States and the concept of a free and independent Lithuania and on such terms and conditions as shall be determined by the association. The association shall have the right to buy other real and personal, to make contracts and agreements and to borrow funds which shall promote and make possible the furthering of the above stated objectives and also to help make this association self-supporting. The association shall also have the right to lend money on a non-profit basis to other Lithuanian organizations who are members of the Detroit Lithuanian Home Association.

Despite the redundant language of the document, it is clear that the goal of the association was to act as a non-profit umbrella group for Lithuanian organizations loyal to America and a free Lithuania. Some of the member organizations which used the hall were: The Detroit Lithuanian Organizations Centre, The Detroit Chapter of the Lithuanian Journalists, The Detroit Chapter of the Lithuanian American Committee of the USA, Inc., The Lithuanian Boy Scouts and Girl Scouts, the Lithuanian Sport Club "Kovas", and the Baltic Nations Committee of Detroit, Inc. A letter of thanks from the chairman of the Baltic Nations Committee indicates that many of these groups used the facilities free of charge, depending on the purpose of the use. For a Commemoration of Mass Deportations, the Baltic Nations Committee paid only two dollars and fifty cents to cover the cost of paper table cloths.

Although the Detroit Lithuanian Home Association had relationships with many Detroit organizations, it is clear that its most important relationship was with the Dariaus and Gireno Club. After completing the purchase of the Bohemian National Hall, alterations separated the barroom from the rest of the facilities, allowing the Dariaus and Gineno Club to obtain a private social club designation (501c4) and establish themselves at a separate address within the building. The club became the number one source of income for the Detroit Lithuanian Home Association, paying rent for the bar space and donating the majority of the bar's profit to the association. For example, the D & G Club made a profit of $24,340.00 from 1963 to 1965, but donated $20,367.00 of those profits, most of it to the DLHA. In addition, the D & G club passed a rule that only members who donated $100.00 to the DLHA could work behind the bar.

The D & G Club also supported other Lithuanian organizations. The minutes of officers' meetings held during 1965 and 1966 detail donations made to various Lithuanian schools in Detroit, The Lithuanian-American Council, The Lithuanian Boy Scouts, The Lithuanian Student Organization, Lithuanian Independence Commemoration, The Lithuanian March on the United Nations, the Lithuanian Radio Program and the Lithuanian Relief Fund, a group which helped 30,000 displaced Lithuanians resettle in Detroit. The club also helped with the funeral expenses of its members, paid for sympathy notices and flowers, kept an annual subscription to three Lithuanian language newspapers, and sponsored the "Kovas" Basketball team. It held annual banquets for the 4th of July, Easter, and Christmas Eve and paid for masses at St. Anthony to commemorate the deaths of Dariaus and Gireno.

In addition to playing a central role in the local Lithuanian community, the D & G Klubas and the DLHA also played an active role in local, national and international affairs. For example, the DLHA hosted Michigan Governor George W. Romney at an anniversary banquet held at the hall. Dr. Vytautas Mileris, President of both organizations in the late 1960s, wrote a letter in support of the nomination of Jerome Zielinski to the board of the Export-Import Bank. In addition, the members of both groups were part of a sustained letter writing campaign to help pass House Congressional Resolution 416, a bill that called for freedom for the Baltic States.

Although the first five years in the Bohemian National Home were full of activities including concerts, dramas, lectures, art shows and dances, things began to change in 1967. In June of that year, the DLHA received correspondence from the Internal Revenue Service which denied its application for non-profit status (501c3), making donations to the organization ineligible for tax deduction. Also in 1967, the city experienced the unprecedented devastation of the 1967 Detroit riot. The membership lists of the D & G Klubas show a steady decrease in membership from 1967, when there were 321 dues-paying members, to 1977, when there were only 120 dues-paying members. Decay began to manifest itself in the surrounding neighborhood and by 1969, the DLHA had paid to tear down four abandoned houses. In 1970, it appears that the situation in the neighborhood was worsening. In a letter to the Michigan Liquor Control Commission, the club requests permission to put an interior door connecting the bar to the main facilities. The club gives as reason for the request:

the neighborhood outside is old and run down and there have been a number of incidents where our members have been robbed, beaten or harassed. Many members feel it is dangerous to go outside the club which they have to do every time they want to get to the rest of the building.

A police report dated July 15, 1974, seems to confirm the dreary picture painted by the letter to the MLCC. Responding to a break-in and robbery at the hall, officers used a K-9 unit to track a suspect to a nearby house on 23rd Street (one block away) where the officers recovered a number of stolen items, including the bar television, a cash register and 40 bottles of liquor. Another robbery in 1975 led the club to hire a patrol service starting in 1976.

The year 1983 was the last time that the DLHA was issued a business license for the hall. Yearly donations from the D & G Klubas had shrunk from the thousands of dollars donated in the 1960s to a total of forty five dollars for the entire year of 1977. For the remainder of the 1980s, the main hall was almost vacant, with little to no activity on a daily basis. The only part of the building that was still used daily was the barroom that was a favorite gathering spot for a handful of Lithuanian World War II Vets. In 1996, the Bohemian National Home was bought by a local historic preservation grad student, who remains part of the ownership to this day.

== Multicultural Detroit period (1996–present) ==
After buying the Bohemian National Home from the Lithuanians in 1996, the new owner was in the process of removing multiple layers of graffiti from its exterior walls when a neighborhood resident struck up a conversation. "What are you going to do with that building?" she asked. After explaining that he intended to renovate the building as a multi-media, multi-cultural community center that would be available for use by the neighborhood and other local Detroit organizations, the neighbor seemed more comfortable and began to open up. "Those people who were here before you were racist pigs", the woman stated. "Oh really," he replied, "and why do you think that?" Although unable to point to any specific instances of racist activity, she insisted that they must have been racists because they "stayed to themselves" and didn't invite the other neighborhood residents to any of their functions. He made a brief attempt to explain that most non-English speaking immigrant communities in the United States experienced similar periods of self-imposed isolation as they underwent assimilation and that it was a desire to preserve their native language and culture that most often led them to "stay to themselves".

Although his sidewalk attempt to share some basic immigration history with the woman seemed to fall on deaf ears, the encounter, and many more like it, made two things very clear. First, that there was an almost complete lack of communication and understanding between the most recent occupants of the building and the African American residents of the neighborhood. The "word on the street" varied from a belief that they were ex-Nazis (particularly strange given the dedication of the club to two Lithuanians shot down by the Nazis), to a group of mobsters, but no one he spoke with could say what nationality they were or how they came to be in the neighborhood. The story of an entire local community of immigrants seemed at risk of being lost in rumour and speculation. It seemed appropriate to allow a bit of historical research to reveal more of the truth (some of which, comprise the "Bohemian and Lithuanian Periods" of this entry). Second, any redevelopment and reuse plans for the Bohemian National Home would have to somehow include the surrounding neighborhood. The hall is one of five sizable, non-residential buildings interspersed in the residential blocks of the neighborhood, and the residents feel a sense of ownership of these spaces. The other four buildings include two churches, a parochial school, and a church convent converted into offices for Core-City Neighborhoods, a non-profit community organization. All four of these building afford some level of access to the neighborhood residents. None of these buildings have a problem with graffiti or vandalism.

The Bohemian National Home, on the other hand, was, in 1996, replete with graffiti and signs of vandalism. The area around the hall was the worst block in the neighborhood and had a disproportionate amount of vacant lots and vacant houses. Illegal drug sales and related activities occurred around the clock and the building had been the target of scavengers who steal copper piping, wiring and any other item that can be turned into a few quick dollars. The current owner fought off two very serious attempts to "bust open" the Bohemian National Home to the scavengers, and then decided that the only way to preserve it from the landfill, was to assume the role of steward, for better or worse. Although the hall has the physical presence of a public building, it had been inaccessible to surrounding residents of other cultures, leading to resentment, misunderstanding and a lack of the kind of public stewardship exhibited by the neighborhood toward the other large buildings. At that time of the 1996 purchase from the Lithuanians, the hall and the vacant land around it represented a large void in the fabric of the neighborhood. The result was an environment in which illicit activity flourished, creating a nuisance for the entire neighborhood.

=== Youth programming ===
Youth programs conducted on a frequent basis by the National Home include the Bohemian Kids Improv Troupe, the Michigan Avenue Mural Project, and the Music Appreciation Program.

=== Music programming ===
From 1996 to 2005, the Bohemian National Home hosted a variety of events, fundraisers, parties, weddings, etc. The hall also became well known on the Electronic Music Circuit and hosted Techno DJs from around the world. These events proved invaluable to stabilizing the building from further deterioration.

From 2005 to 2008 the Bohemian National Home operated under the direction of musician/booker/promoter Joel Peterson. Artists that played the Bohemian National Home during that time period include Blowfly, Ken Vandermark, Joe McPhee and Trio X, The Evens, Sam Rivers, Eugene Chadbourne, Noah Howard, Human Eye, Faruq Z Bey, Paal Nilssen-Love, Rhys Chatham, Mary Halvorson, Peter Walker, Jack Rose, Odu Afrobeat Orchestra, Daniel Higgs, Cooper-Moore and Assif Tsahar, Magik Markers, Henry Grimes, Charles Gayle, Extra Golden, Rising Star Drum and Fife Band, Tara Jane O'Neil, Roy Campbell, Josephine Foster, Salim Washington, Growing, William Parker, Nautical Almanac, Tatsuya Nakatani, Thollem McDonas, Trevor Watts, Jimmy Carl Black, The Bird Dogs (who became the Rue Moor Counts), Mats Gustafsson and Awesome Color.

Since 2008, under the new leadership of Musician in Residence, Charles Buddy Smith, the Bohemian National Home continues to host music in its many forms.

Some of the recent visits include John Sinclair and the Blues Scholars, Pink Eye Orchestra, Duende, Ron English Ensemble, Wardell Montgomery, Gardens, Hot Damn, Carjack, Oatmeal, Chris Kennington, Woodman, Black Lodge, Oblisk, Mother Whale, The Oscillating Fan Club, Indian Guides, Marco Polo and the New Vaccines, RJ Spangler, Phil Hale Harmonics, Thornetta Davis, Red China, Arrogant Bastards, Mantons, Blue Song, Bill Harris, Glen Allen, Jura, The Summer Pledge, Josh Dahlberg, Kevin Reynolds, Root Bear, Buddy Smith, Derek Plaslaiko, Green Room Rockers, Jeff Grand, Paul Carey, and 1592.

Music performances generally take place either in Klubas Coffeehouse (which is housed in the original barroom), The Library, which is an intimate space adjoining the barroom on the first floor, or The Ballroom which takes up 4,000 square feet (370 m^{2}) of the second floor.

=== Annual festivals ===
July 2006 marked First Annual Bohemian National Home Festival of Jazz and Improvised music. The inaugural festival featured jazz legend Sam Rivers as well groups ranging from Free improvisation to Cuban Jazz. The 2007 Festival featured Noah Howard, Sabir Mateen, Craig Taborn, Gerald Cleaver, Charles Waters, and the legendary Sun Ra Arkestra led by Marshall Allen. The 2008 Festival happened during the last weekend in May and featured Matthew Shipp, Joe Morris, Ellery Eskelin, Eugene Chadbourne, and Trevor Watts. Unfortunately, this wonderful festival will no longer take place at the Bohemian National Home.

== See also ==
- Narodni dim
- The Furnace (magazine)
