= Chamber of Representatives =

Chamber of Representatives is or was a legislative body of several governments:

- Chamber of Representatives of Misiones, Argentina
- Chamber of Representatives (Belgium)
- Chamber of Representatives of Burkina Faso
- Chamber of Representatives of Colombia
- Chamber of Representatives (France), during the Hundred Days in 1815
- Chamber of Representatives of the Memel Territory, or Parliament of the Klaipėda Region, Lithuania 1924–1939
- Chamber of Representatives of Uruguay

== See also ==
- House of Representatives
