= Council of States =

Council of States may refer to:

- Rajya Sabha (Council of States), the upper house of the Parliament of India
- Council of States (South Sudan), established in 2011 by interim constitution – one of two chambers that compose the National Legislature of South Sudan
- Council of States (Sudan)
- Council of States (Switzerland)

== See also ==
- Council of State
