= Ukrainian Cultural Centre of Toronto =

Organisation in Canada

Coordinates: 43.665468°N 79.419026°W

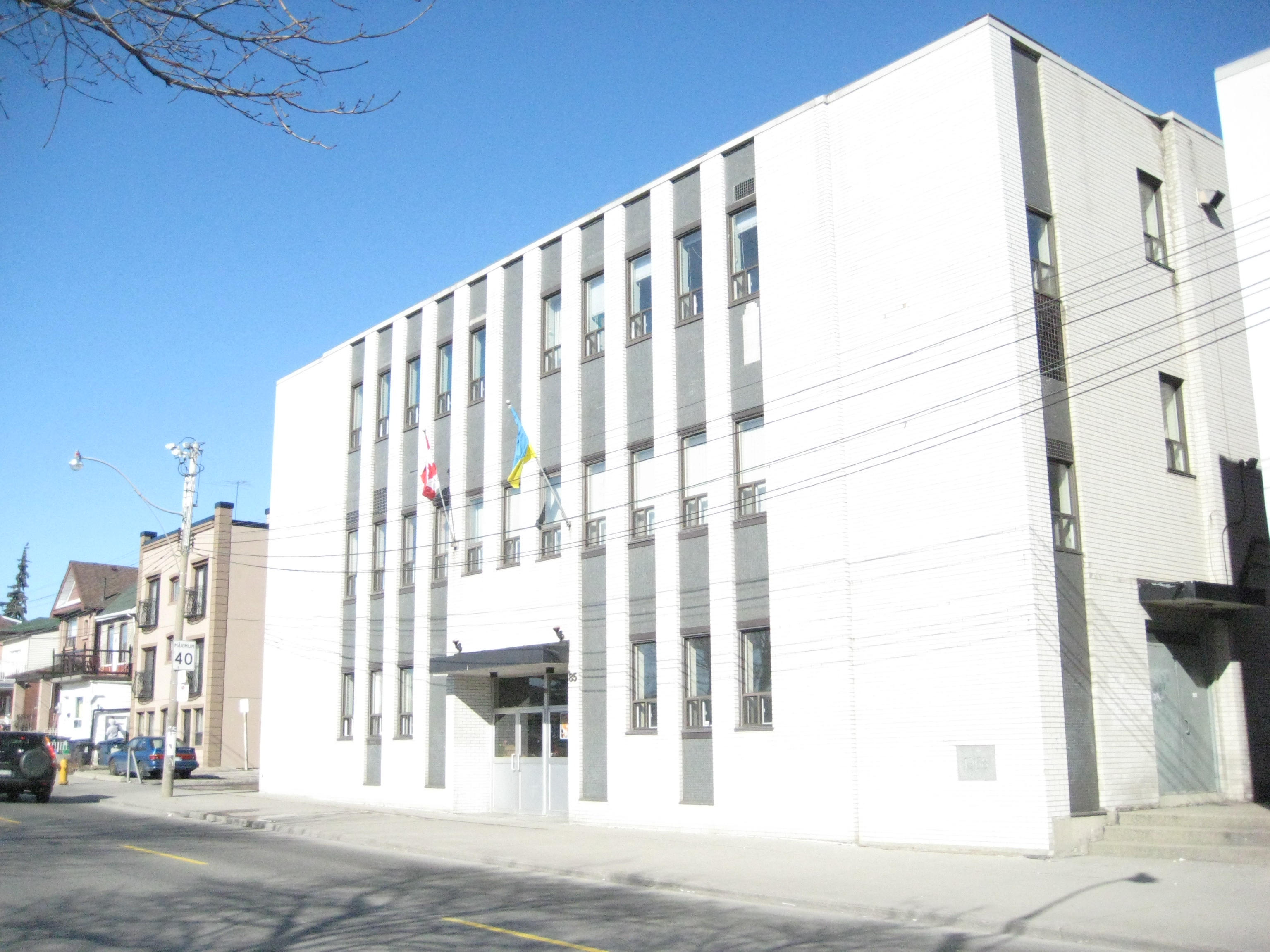
Ukrainian Cultural Centre of Toronto

The Ukrainian Cultural Centre of Toronto was located at 83-85 Christie St., Toronto, Ontario, Canada until the building was sold in 2013. (The Centre has relocated to the Old Mill Hotel and Banquet complex since then).

"Christie", as the building was simply dubbed, was host to many Ukrainian events, and was the heart of the Ukrainian community in the Greater Toronto Area, bringing together people with a common culture and ideas. The Centre was where the Ukrainian ancestral heritage was kept alive for several decades and also where English classes for newcomers and immigrants to Canada were offered.

The Ukrainian Cultural Centre of Toronto consisted of banquet halls, concert stage, kitchen, classrooms, library, cafeteria, a nightclub, offices and a gymnasium. The Centre was home to the main offices of both the weekly Ukrainian language national newspaper HOMIN UKRAINY (Ukrainian Echo) and the Ukrainian Youth Association of Canada. Both these institutions were founded in 1948 by Ukrainian immigrants to Canada.

From the 1970s, and through to the 1990s, the Centre was home to the Metro Toronto International Caravan Festival Ukrainian Pavilion.

Before 1960, the building at 83 Christie St. was originally the home of the Toronto branch of the UJPO (United Jewish Peoples' Order). From 2013 through 2024, the building was owned by Jesus Is Lord Church Worldwide, later called "The Meeting House", which also closed.

In 2019, the satellite centre in Hamilton, Ontario was destroyed by a fire.
