= Sansad =

Sansad or Sangsad is the word for "Assembly", association, council or "Parliament" in several Indo-Aryan languages, derived from a Sanskrit root. It may also mean:

== National parliament ==
=== Bangladesh ===
- Jatiya Sangsad ("National Parliament" of Bangladesh; Bengali: জাতীয় সংসদ Jatiyô Sôngsôd)
  - Jatiya Sangsad Bhaban, National Parliament House of Bangladesh
  - Speaker of the Jatiya Sangsad
  - Sangsad Television

=== India ===
- Bhāratīya Sansad (Parliament of India)
  - Sansad Marg
  - Sansad Bhavan
  - Sansad TV
  - Sansad Adarsh Gram Yojana

=== Nepal ===
- Saṅghīya Sansad Nēpāl (Nepali: संघीय संसद नेपाल) Federal Parliament of Nepal

== Other uses ==
- Muktijoddha Sangsad, a non-political welfare association of the combatants during the Bangladesh Liberation war
- Padatik Nattya Sangsad, a Dhaka based Bengali theatre group
- Muktijoddha Sangsad KC, a football club in Bangladesh
- Kendriya Muslim Sahitya Sangsad, a literary organisation located in Sylhet, Bangladesh
- Narayanganj Suktara Sangsad, a football team of Narayanganj, Bangladesh
- Pakistan Sahitya Sangsad
