= Maison du Peuple (Clichy) =

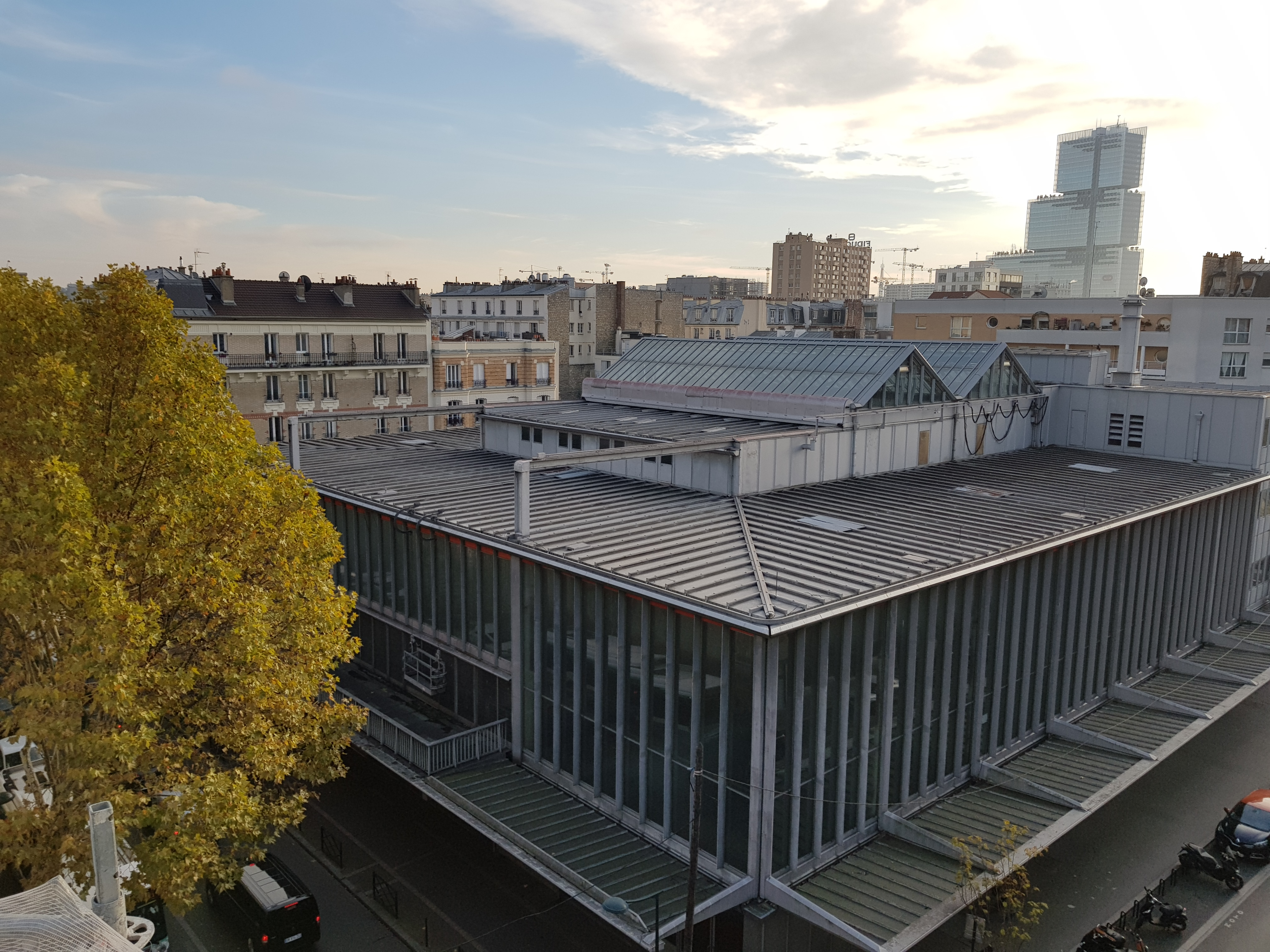
- Maison du Peuple of Clichy
- Established: 1935-1939
- Location: Clichy-la-Garenne, France
- Coordinates: 48.9013352°N 2.3146490000000313°E

The Maison du Peuple (French pronunciation: [mɛzɔ̃ dy pœpl], lit. 'House of the People') in Clichy, classified as official historical monument of France (Monument Historique) since 1983, is a building built from 1935 to 1939 in the Parisian suburb of Clichy-la-Garenne by the architects Eugène Beaudouin, Marcel Lods, the engineer Vladimir Bodiansky and Jean Prouvé.

The Maison du Peuple of Clichy is both "an architectural jewel of the first immediate suburbs ", "a mechanical jewel " and "a perfect example of harmony between modernity and modernisation"

== History ==
In 1935, the mayor of Clichy, Charles Auffray, launched a competition for architects to cover the outdoor market in Rue de Lorraine. The architects Beaudouin and Lods, associated with the engineer Vladimir Bodianski, proposed an innovative project: they intended to put the space to maximum use and therefore planned to leave the market on the ground floor while adding a floor on top of it that could house offices and a multipurpose room with 1,000 seats. The room was meant to be multi-functional: it could be transformed into a cinema, in a fully modular build with partitions, a retractable floor and a retractable roof, in a marvel of ingenuity.

To achieve what Charles Auffray called the Maison du Peuple, the architects collaborated with Jean Prouvé. Prouvé provided original technical solutions, the most exemplary of which remains the curtain walls, used for the first time in Clichy: the walls are not load-bearing, but instead simply suspended from the structure.

For its foundations, it seemed useful at that time to build a basement intended to serve, possibly, as an anti-aircraft shelter that still exists today. It is located on the boulevard du Général Leclerc side. It could accommodate around 200 people living in the area during the alerts.

The restoration of the building was undertaken in 1993 under the leadership of Hervé Baptiste.
