= People's House (disambiguation) =

A People's House is a European type of leisure, cultural and community centre.

People's House may also refer to:

- People's house (United Kingdom), a building specification proposed by Harold Macmillan
- Halkevleri (meaning "People's House"), a 20th-century Turkish state-sponsored community project
- Vermont State House
- The People's House of Florida, a historic U.S. residence in Tallahassee
- The People's House: A White House Experience, a museum in Washington, D.C.
- Palace of the Parliament, also known as "People's House" (Casa Poporului) in Bucharest, Romania

== See also ==
- House of the People (disambiguation)
- Casa Pueblo (disambiguation)
