= House of Delegates =

House of Delegates may refer to:

== Current ==
- Maryland House of Delegates
- House of Delegates of Palau
- Virginia House of Delegates
- West Virginia House of Delegates

== Former ==
- House of Delegates (South Africa), the legislative chamber for the Indian population of South Africa from 1984 to 1994
- Legislative Assembly of Puerto Rico between 1900 and 1917
