= House of Representatives =

General term for legislative bodies

House of Representatives is the name of legislative bodies in many countries and sub-national entities. In many countries, the House of Representatives is the lower house of a bicameral legislature, with the corresponding upper house often called a "Senate". In some countries, the House of Representatives is the sole chamber of a unicameral legislature.

The functioning of a house of representatives can vary greatly from country to country, and depends on whether a country has a parliamentary or a presidential system. Members of a House of Representatives are typically apportioned according to population rather than geography.

The United States House of Representatives, first convened in 1789, was closely patterned on the House of Commons of Great Britain. It retains features such as a speaker of the house who is the presiding officer.

== National legislatures ==
"The House of Representatives" currently is the name of a house of the legislature in the following countries:

Country	English name	Local name
Antigua and Barbuda	House of Representatives	
Australia	House of Representatives	
Bahrain	Council of Representatives	Arabic: مجلس النواب (Majlis an-nuwab)
Belarus	House of Representatives	Belarusian: Палата прадстаўнікоў (Palata pradstaŭnikoŭ); Russian: Палата представителей (Palata predstavitelej)
Belgium	Chamber of Representatives	Dutch: Kamer van Volksvertegenwoordigers; French: Chambre des Représentants; German: Abgeordnetenkammer
Belize	House of Representatives	
Bosnia and Herzegovina	House of Representatives of Bosnia and Herzegovina	Bosnian: Predstavnički dom Croatian: Zastupnički dom Serbian Cyrillic: Представнички дом
Colombia	Chamber of Representatives	Spanish: Cámara de Representantes
Egypt	House of Representatives	Arabic: مجلس النواب (Majilis Al-Nuwab)
Ethiopia	House of Peoples' Representatives	Amharic: የሕዝብ ተወካዮች ምክር ቤት (Ye-Hizib Tewekayochi Mikir Bēt)
Grenada	House of Representatives	
Indonesia	House of Representatives	Indonesian: Dewan Perwakilan Rakyat
Jamaica	House of Representatives	
Japan	House of Representatives	Japanese: 衆議院 (Shūgiin)
Jordan	House of Representatives	Arabic: مجلس النواب (Majlis al-Nuwaab)
Liberia	House of Representatives	
Malaysia	House of Representatives	Malay: Dewan Rakyat (Note: Literally, "People's Hall")
Morocco	House of Representatives	Arabic: مجلس النواب (Majlis al-Nuwwab); Berber languages: ⴰⴳⵔⴰⵡ ⵉⵎⴰⵔⴰⵢⴻⵏ (Asqqim n Imura)
Myanmar (Burma)	House of Representatives	Burmese: ပြည်သူ့လွှတ်တော် (Pyithu Hluttaw)
Nepal	House of Representatives	Nepali: प्रतिनिधि सभा (Pratinidi Sabha)
Netherlands	House of Representatives	Dutch: Tweede Kamer, lit. 'Second Chamber'
Nigeria	House of Representatives	
Philippines	House of Representatives of the Philippines	Filipino: Kapulungan ng mga Kinatawan; Spanish: Cámara de Representantes
Tajikistan	Assembly of Representatives	Tajik: Маҷлиси намояндагон (Majlisi namoyandagon)
Thailand	House of Representatives	Thai: สภาผู้แทนราษฎร (Sapha Phuthaen Ratsadon)
Trinidad and Tobago	House of Representatives	
United States	United States House of Representatives	
Uruguay	Chamber of Representatives of Uruguay	Spanish: Cámara de Representantes
Yemen	House of Representatives	Arabic: مجلس النواب (Majlis al-Nuwaab)

In the following countries it is the sole chamber in a unicameral system:

Country	English name	Local name
Cyprus	House of Representatives	Greek: Βουλή των Αντιπροσώπων (Vouli Antiprosópon); Turkish: Temsilciler Meclisi
Iraq	Council of Representatives	Arabic: مجلس النواب العراقي (Majlis Al-Niwab Al-Iraqi); Kurdish: ئه‌نجومه‌نی نوێنه‌ران (Encumenî Nöneran)
Libya	House of Representatives	Arabic: مجلس النواب (Majlis an-Nuwwab)
Malta	House of Representatives	Maltese: Kamra tad-Deputati
New Zealand	New Zealand House of Representatives	Māori: Whare o ngā Māngai
Tunisia	Assembly of the Representatives of the People	Arabic: مجلس نواب الشعب (Majless Noweb al Shaab); French: Assemblée des représentants du peuple, ARP

The Indonesian People's Representative Council (Dewan Perwakilan Rakyat, DPR), the Dewan Rakyat of the Parliament of Malaysia and the Dáil Éireann of the Irish Oireachtas are all sometimes called "House of Representatives" in English.

== Subnational legislatures ==
House of Representatives is the title of most, but not all, of the lower houses of U.S. state legislatures, with the exceptions usually called "State Assembly", "General Assembly", or more rarely, "House of Delegates".

In Germany, the Landtag parliament of the city and state of Berlin, the Abgeordnetenhaus, is known in English as the House of Representatives.

In Tanzania, the semi-autonomous islands of Zanzibar has its own legislative body, the Zanzibar House of Representatives.

The legislature of the Federation of Bosnia and Herzegovina, the Bosniak-Croat majority federal entity of Bosnia and Herzegovina, mirrors the State parliament, with the lower house designated as the Federal House of Representatives.

== Defunct Houses of Representatives ==
From 1867 until 1918, in Cisleithania, the Austrian part of the Austro-Hungarian monarchy, the lower house of the Imperial Council (Reichsrat) parliament, the Abgeordnetenhaus was generally known in English as "House of Representatives". Since 1855 the lower house in the Landtag of Prussia was called Abgeordnetenhaus, as distinct from the upper House of Lords.

In 1934, the Nebraska voters approved a unicameral legislature dissolving the House of Representatives and transferring its powers to the Senate.

The Kenyan House of Representatives was combined with the Senate in 1966, to form an enlarged single chamber parliament, known as the National Assembly. The Senate was re-established as an upper house following the 2010 Kenyan constitutional referendum.

Under the First and Second Republics, the National Assembly of South Korea was officially bicameral, consisting of the House of Councillors and House of Representatives. In practice, however, the National Assembly was unicameral under the First Republic, as the first election of the House of Councillors was not held until the Second Republic was founded in 1960. Following a military coup the following year, the National Assembly was dissolved. Since its restoration in December 1963, the National Assembly has been unicameral.

The Constituent Assembly of Turkey, sometimes also called as the House of Representatives (Temsilciler Meclisi), formed the non-elected, unicameral legislature of Turkey; established by the military rule that was installed after the 1960 Turkish coup d'état. The legislature had existed for around ten months, between 6 January 1961 and 24 October 1961. The legislature is not included in the lists of Parliaments of Turkey, as it was a non-elected legislature.

The House of Representatives of Ceylon (now Sri Lanka) was the lower chamber of the parliament established in 1947 according to the Soulbury Constitution. The 1972 First Republican Constitution of Sri Lanka replaced it with the unicameral National State Assembly.

The Parliament of Sierra Leone, like its counterparts in other former British colonies, began as a Legislative Council. It was inaugurated in 1863 but was renamed the House of Representatives in 1954.

Following the surrender of South Vietnam to North Vietnamese and Viet Cong forces in 1975, a Provisional Revolutionary Government established itself in Saigon and disbanded the bicameral National Assembly consisting of the Senate and the House of Representatives.

Under apartheid, the House of Representatives was the house for South Africa's mixed race 'Coloured' community, in the Tricameral Parliament of 1984 to 1994.

In 1994 the House of Representatives of the Gambia was dissolved in a coup d'état led by Yahya Jammeh. It was replaced as the legislature by the National Assembly according to the 1997 Constitution of The Gambia.

The House of Representatives of Fiji was the lower chamber of Fiji's Parliament from 1970 to 2006. It was suspended by the 2006 military coup. The 2013 Constitution abolished it and replaced it with a single chamber Parliament.

== See also ==
- Chamber of Deputies
- House of Commons
- National Assembly
- List of legislatures by country
