= Supreme state organ of power =

Institution in communist states

The supreme state organ of power (abbreviated SSOP in the following) (Note: This designation has been translated differently by scholars and by communist states: supreme organ of state power, supreme organ of state authority; supreme state organ of authority.; highest state organ of power, highest organ of state power, highest state organ of authority, highest organ of state authority, and; the term "organ" is often replaced with "body" in many translations.) is a type of legislature and the supreme institution in communist states. It operates under the Marxist–Leninist principle of unified state power and serves as the apex of the pyramid-like structure known as the unified state apparatus, providing the structural precondition for democratic centralism in the state. Unlike systems based on the fusion or separation of powers, the SSOP holds legislative, executive, judicial, and all other forms of state power, but commonly delegates these powers to subordinate state organs in line with a division of labour. It formally regards itself as the embodiment of popular sovereignty and its activities in practice are closely shaped by the ruling communist party.

The SSOP's theoretical origins trace back to Jean-Jacques Rousseau's idea of a "supreme power" of the people, Karl Marx's call for unity of state power, and Vladimir Lenin's vision of soviets as working organs which combined lawmaking and execution. The world's first SSOP was the All-Russian Congress of Soviets, established after the 1917 October Revolution, and it became the prototype for similar institutions in other communist states.

SSOPs meet periodically, with most of their powers delegated to their permanent organs. These organs exercise most or all of the SSOP's powers between SSOP sessions. The balance between plenary sessions and permanent organs vary; SSOP sessions in the Soviet Union were infrequent and primarily served as rubber stamps for decisions already made by the party leadership. However, historically in states such as Poland, Yugoslavia, and in present-day Vietnam SSOP sessions sometimes act as legislative forums where policies are debated and amended. In all communist states, SSOPs also have important symbolic roles as expressions of popular sovereignty and channels for representation and often include workers, peasants, women, and ethnic minorities in greater proportions than in similar entities in liberal democracies. They continue to exist in China, Cuba, Laos, North Korea and Vietnam, although their roles vary considerably.

== Historical and theoretical origins ==
=== Marx's call for the unity of power ===
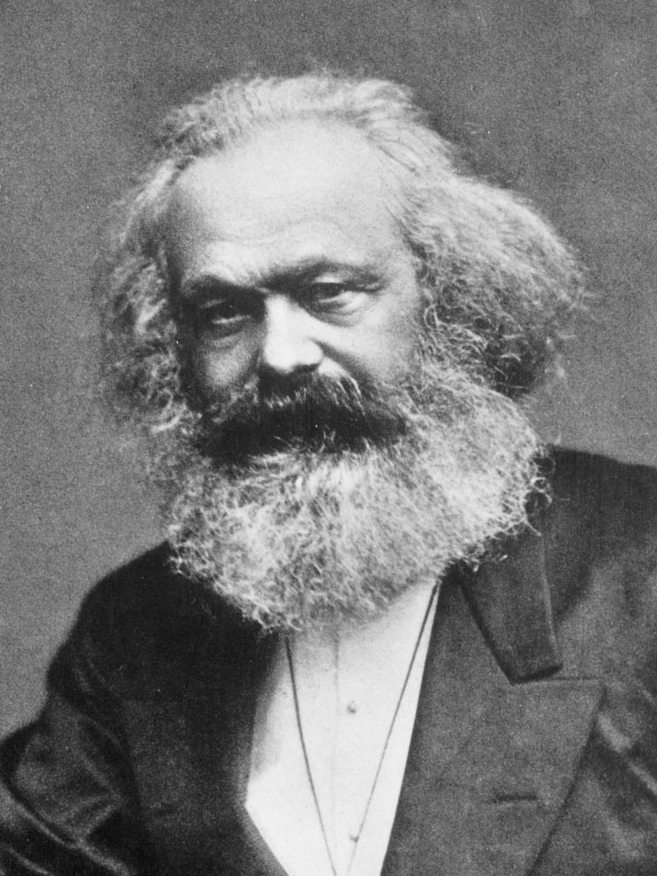
Karl Marx created the theoretical basis for unified power in his writings.

The concept of the SSOP traces its historical origins to Jean-Jacques Rousseau, who championed the establishment of "one supreme power that governs us according to wise laws". This idea had a sizable impact on Marxist−Leninist theory, and was used to argue for the rejection of bourgeois parliamentary democracy. Karl Marx, the founder of Marxism, was skeptical of the state in general and its executive powers in particular. Marx aimed to end the situation in which the state became "independent of, and superior to, the nation itself, from which it was but a parasitical excrescence." He believed that what he considered the modern constitutions of the dictatorship of the bourgeoisie vested power in the executive at the expense of the legislature, and he criticised the French Constitution of 1848 for replacing the hereditary monarchy with an elected monarch (the president of the republic).

From Marx's perspective, in France the separation of powers increased the president's power vis-à-vis that of the legislature. The president alone became a symbol of state authority, and the 1848 French constitution had created a system with "two heads [...] the Legislative Assembly, on the one hand, [and] the President on the other." Marx believed that the presidency threatened the constitutional order, and its powers could easily be abused by a person who sought to overthrow the legislature and establish a personal dictatorship (as Louis-Napoléon did in 1851).

Marx vehemently opposed the separation of powers. He said about Article 19 of the 1848 French constitution, which stated that the "separation of powers is the first principle of a free government", "Here we have the old constitutional folly. The condition of a 'free government' is not the division, but the unity of power. The machinery of government cannot be too simple. It is always the craft of knaves to make it complicated and mysterious." By "unity of power", Marx supported the concentration of state powers in a national elected-representative organ rather than an individual. In Marx's mind, according to scholar Bruno Leipold, this would weaken the state's executive powers. Unity of power evolved into the unified power principle of communist states.

Marx preferred the French Constitution of 1793, which subordinated the executive and all other state organs to the National Assembly. That constitution established a form of government known as assembly government. In this form, the government (as the state executive) was an internal organ of the national representative institution. The underlying idea behind assembly government was to reject the separation of powers and a mixed government, in the belief that the popularly-elected national-representative institution had the right to intervene in all state affairs. The French experiment with assembly government was short-lived, and Marx sought another model that fit his theoretical framework – a model not conceived by the bourgeoisie, since "the working class cannot simply lay hold of the ready-made State machinery, and wield it for its own purposes."

He eventually found his model of socialist governance in the Paris Commune of 1871. Marx believed that the form of government outlined by the commune was a "new point of departure of world-historical importance", and called it "the political form at last discovered under which to work out the economical emancipation of Labour." The commune had replaced representative government with the idea of popular delegation through imperative mandates, the right to recall elected representatives, and the establishment of legislative supremacy. Marx called this form of government a social republic: "a Republic is only in France and Europe possible as a 'Social Republic', that is a Republic which disowns the capital and landowner class of the State machinery to supersede it by the Commune, that frankly avows 'social emancipation' as the great goal of the Republic and guarantees thus that social transformation by the Communal organisation."

Marx admired the Paris Commune's unification of legislative and executive powers in one organ: the Commune Council, which was a "working, not a parliamentary, body, executive and legislative at the same time." Unification of powers meant that the Commune Council staffed ten commissions, dealing with executive and administrative matters, elected from its membership; two-thirds of the council concurrently held legislative, executive, and administrative offices, and Marx called the Commune Council a working organ. Unlike a liberal democracy, there was no president, prime minister, or cabinet minister separate from the commune council.

=== Lenin's establishment of an SSOP ===
Vladimir Lenin (the key initiator of the establishment of the Russian Soviet Federative Socialist Republic and the Soviet Union) was influenced by the writings of Marx and Friedrich Engels, Marx's main collaborator. Before the communists seized power in the October Revolution of 1917, Lenin outlined the general features of the future post-revolutionary state structure in The State and Revolution. In this pamphlet, Lenin outlines how he and the Russian Social Democratic Labour Party (Bolsheviks) sought to violently destroy the dictatorship of the bourgeoisie because it was a "democracy for an insignificant minority, democracy for the rich—that is the democracy of capitalist society." He condemns the "con" that is the separation of powers and the state bureaucratic organisation.

The main aim of The State and Revolution was to outline the state form of the dictatorship of the proletariat. Like Marx before him, Lenin believed that the proletariat could only seize power through a revolutionary takeover; he rejected parliamentarism and the idea that the proletariat could peacefully take power through elections. Lenin accused parliamentarism of being an empty form of representative democracy, and said that the future political system needed to be delegatory. In this proletarian state, the claimed false separation of the state between executive, legislative, judicial, and administrative organs would be replaced with unified power, and parliamentarism would be abolished.

Lenin believed that "[t]he way out of parliamentarism" was not through abolishing representative institutions and elections; the answer was to transform representative institutions from "talking shops" into "working organs", akin to Marx's vision. Lenin believed that this new representative institution was opposed to parliamentarism. He criticized the parliamentary systems of the United States, Switzerland, France, the United Kingdom, and Norway; in these countries, Lenin said, the state's essential functions were carried out in an opaque manner and kept hidden from the working population by its political leaders and bureaucrats.

While bourgeois constitutions, which are imbued with the doctrinairism of the possessing classes and take into account the internal struggle of separate groups of bourgeois society, have set up an artificial separation between individual elements of power (legislative, executive, judicial), we, in our constitution, aim to concentrate as far as possible all these elements in one central organ; and such [organ] is the All-Russian Congress of Soviets, the Central Executive Committee that it elects, and the Council of People's Commissars, which is accountable to both of them.

— Yuri Steklov, a member of the constitutional drafting committee for Soviet Russia's first constitution.

Lenin believed that his proposed political system, inspired by Marx's views on the Paris Commune, should replace what he perceived as a corrupt parliamentary system. In this system, he said, elected representatives would be responsible for governing directly, enforcing their own laws, witnessing the outcomes of their actions, and being accountable to the people they represent (the opposite of parliamentarism and the separation of powers); the bureaucrat, elected representative, legislator, and executor were merged into one individual.

Under Lenin's leadership, Russian communists established the world's first SSOP (the All-Russian Congress of Soviets) when it convened for its first session on 16 June 1917. The institution was formalised by a decision of the fifth convocation of the All-Russian Congress of Soviets when it adopted Soviet Russia's (and the world's first communist) constitution on 19 July 1918. Presenting the draft constitution to the All-Russian Congress of Soviets, Yuri Steklov (a member of the constitutional drafting committee) said that unlike a bourgeois constitution with an artificial separation of state powers, the Soviet constitution aimed to concentrate all these powers ("legislative, executive, judicial") into one organ: the All-Russian Congress of Soviets and its internal organs, the Central Executive Committee and the Council of People's Commissars. The powers of the Congress were strengthened in the first constitution of the Soviet Union, adopted in 1924, which granted the All-Union Congress of Soviets and the Central Executive Committee the right of making decisions on "all questions which they deem to be subject to their determination"; the Congress's powers were unlimited.

The All-Russian Congress of Soviets convened at least once a year. The congress delegated its powers between sessions to its permanent organ, the Central Executive Committee; the 1918 constitution defined it as "the highest legislative, administrative, and controlling organ" of the state when the All-Russian Congress of Soviets was not in session. At the 11th Congress of the Soviet communist party, held in 1922, Valerian Obolensky proposed reforming the Council of People's Commissars into a cabinet system in which the chair of the Central Executive Committee was responsible for appointing its members. This would have weakened the unified powers of the Congress of Soviets and the Central Executive Committee, and Lenin opposed it. The Central Executive Committee was not a permanent organ; its powers were delegated to the Presidium, "the highest legislative, executive and administrative organ of power", between sessions of the Central Executive Committee and the All-Union Congress of Soviets.

Marxists and non-Marxists critiqued the state system created by the Russian communists. In his book The Proletarian Revolution and the Renegade Kautsky Lenin criticised German social democrat Karl Kautsky, who had called Soviet Russia anti-democratic. According to Lenin, an SSOP provided more accessible representation for workers and peasants than bourgeois democracy. In the Soviet system, Lenin said that the SSOP's elected representatives were empowered to appoint and dismiss bureaucrats and to elect and remove judges; this made the Soviet system "a million times more democratic than the most democratic bourgeois republic."

The 1936 constitution of the Soviet Union was based on unified power and influenced by the first constitutions of Soviet Russia and the Soviet Union. The constitution (known as the Stalin Constitution) was opposed to the separation of powers, but introduced several major alterations. The 1924 constitution gave the All-Union Congress of Soviets and its internal organs, the All-Union Central Executive Committee, the Presidium, and the Council of People's Commissars executive and legislative powers; in the Soviet Union, powers were bestowed in accordance with a division of labour. The 1936 constitution gave the All-Union Supreme Soviet, which replaced the All-Union Congress of Soviets, a monopoly on legislative power. The official reason for the change was that the Soviet economy had become more complex, and state organs needed clearer boundaries. However, the other central state organs remained subordinate to the All-Union Supreme Soviet and its permanent organ, the Presidium. The All-Union Supreme Soviet was considered the source of all state power. This governance framework, outlined in the 1936 constitution, influenced the communist state systems established after World War II in Eastern Europe, Vietnam, China, and North Korea.

== Status ==
The National Assembly House, which is the seat of Vietnam's SSOP, the National Assembly. Constitutionally defined in 1946, it can be considered the oldest surviving SSOP of all existing communist states.

Formally speaking, the SSOP is the most powerful institution of a communist state. The powers of the SSOP are constrained only by the limits it has itself set by constitutional and legal documents it has adopted. For example, in China, according to Chinese legal scholar Zhou Fang, "[t]he powers of the National People's Congress [NPC] as the [SSOP] are boundless, its authority extends to the entire territory of the country, and, if necessary, it can intervene in any matter which it finds it requisite to do so." More specifically, according to Chinese legal scholars Xu Chongde and Niu Wenzhan, "[t]he other central State organs are created by [China's SSOP] and execute the laws and resolutions made by [China's SSOP]."

However, in practice, the sessions of the SSOP are often pliant and used as a showcase of unity amongst the political elite. State powers are transferred between its convocations to its permanent organ, its executive organ, and to the highest organs of the communist party. The SSOP lacks the power to make autonomous decisions independent from the communist party and other state organs. The other state organs, which are formally subordinate to the SSOP, have a high degree of independence from it. That means that while it has an important role to play in the governance of the system, the locus of power in communist states lies elsewhere.

While the communist party tightly controls the supreme state organ of power, it is noteworthy, according to Stephen White, that, unlike the fascist states of the 1930s, communist states have felt obliged to establish representative institutions to gain societal legitimacy. In this sense, similarly to liberal democratic legislatures, the supreme state organs of power, as an institution, contribute to legitimising the social order established by the communist state by acting as a symbol of popular sovereignty. According to Marxist−Leninist thought, the supreme state organs of power are believed to represent a higher form of popular representation than that achieved by the capitalist states. That is why, for example, the 1977 Soviet constitution stated, "In the U.S.S.R. all power belongs to the working people of town and country as represented by the Soviets of Working People's Deputies", and the present-day Chinese constitution states, "All power in the People's Republic of China belongs to the people".

The supreme state organs of power, as well as the lower-level state organs of power, also contribute to nation-building and national integration. They give the populace an institutional tool to participate in decision-making and be represented where decisions were made. While the state organ of power does not function independently from the party, it seeks to increase popular participation. It could also, unlike the communist party (with its strict membership standards), mobilise more people. That is why membership in the supreme state organ of power is usually representative of the population at large, even if they are generally skewed towards male representation, the highly educated, the intelligentsia, and party-state cadres.

The supreme state organs of power were generally more demographically representative than their liberal democratic counterparts. For example, in 1982, the Supreme Soviet of the Soviet Union had more female members than the legislatures of the United States, United Kingdom, France, and Italy combined. Workers, peasants, and ethnic minorities were often well represented compared to their liberal democratic counterparts. This means that the supreme state organs of power, while not autonomous of the communist party, provided an institutional linkage between the ruled and the rulers and functioned as a way for the general public to access the political system.

The supreme state organs of power actively participate in policy-making despite their infrequent and short sessions, which were used to showcase political unity. During a session, the elected representatives of the supreme state organs of power can submit suggestions or propose amendments to legislation. While at the beginning, especially under Joseph Stalin's rule, most legislation was passed as decrees by the permanent organ of the SSOP, by the 1980s, in most communist states, it had become the norm to have legislation be commented on either at sessions of the supreme state organs of power or at the sessions of the special committees.

=== Relationship to the communist party ===
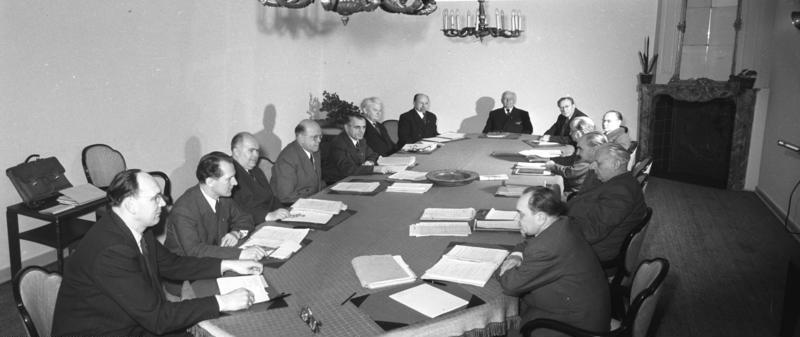
The politburo of the Socialist Unity Party of Germany, the ruling party of East Germany. The party is responsible for guiding the activities of the SSOP in communist states.

According to Marxist−Leninist thought, the communist party functions as the vanguard party of the proletariat and the working masses in a communist state. Because of that position, it takes control of the communist state. Formally, it does so by controlling the SSOP and the lower-level state organs of power. Informally, it does so by colonising the state apparatus by creating party groups within it, which report to the highest organs of the communist party. This system evolved gradually and was formalised for the first time in communist history in the 1936 Soviet constitution. This system ensured that, according to Stalin, the SSOP did not make a single decision on questions of political and organisational importance without the party's involvement. Stalin believed that this system ensured the "highest expression" of the party's leading role in Soviet society. The theoretical origins of Stalin's idea can be traced back to Lenin, who stated, "in order to rule, an army of revolutionaries – Communists hardened in battle is necessary. We have such; it is the Party [...] were the Party to be set aside, there could in fact be no dictatorship of the proletariat in Russia."

The 8th Congress of the Russian Communist Party (Bolsheviks) (RCP), held in 1919, stated that the party needed to realise its programme by completely dominating the state through the SSOP and the lower-level state organs of power, literally the Soviets. This was not to be achieved through coercion, but instead through practical efforts within the soviets by putting forward party members for roles within them, which would ensure the party's monopoly on state power. The congress stressed that the party and state are separate and should not be conflated. The party should aim to have its policies adopted by the SSOP or lower-level state organs of power. The party called this process "guidance", and guidance was to be the party's approach to the SSOP, since it could not replace it.

The RCP argued that there should be a clear distinction between the party and the state. This separation was believed to help state organs systematically consider and make decisions regarding economic issues, while also raising the awareness of each elected representative. Moreover, it allowed the party to focus effectively on its core responsibility of providing general guidance to all state organs. The 12th RCP Congress, held in 1923, stressed the importance of a clear division of labour between the state and the party, while also warning against granting too much autonomy to the state. It was believed that an autonomous state "could create political dangers for the Party." The congress resolution made it clear that the party held responsibility for the economic work conducted by the state, as it was the executor and guarantor of the proletarian dictatorship. The resolution stressed that the party needed to guide the state organs of power and, through them, the entire state apparatus in the desired direction. It suggested that members of the party committee should also concurrently serve as members of the executive committee of the state organ of power at the same level of governance. As such, communist states demarcate between the core of state power, meaning the communist party, and the state power. The party governed through the state organs of power, but could be defined as synonymous with them.

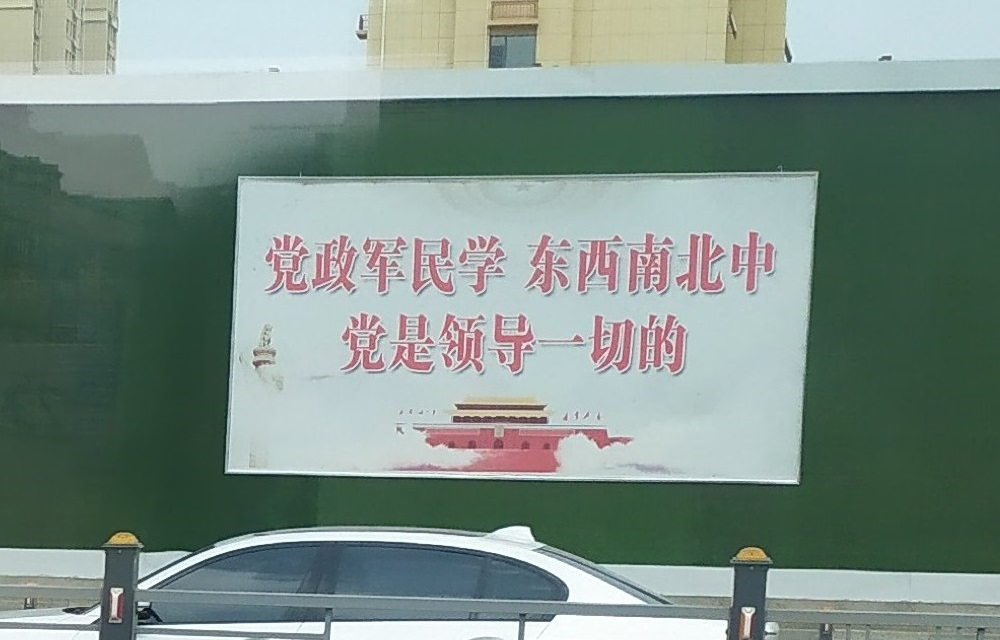
A sign on a Chinese street that reads "Party, government, military, civilian, and academic, north, south, east, west, and center, the Party leads everything."

Communist states have been at pains to stress that the party should not command or force the state organs of power to do anything: they should guide, lead, persuade, teach, and correct them, not replace them. However, they have also made clear that the lack of leadership on the part of the party is also a mistake. For example, in an interview in 1980, Polish communist leader Sylwester Zawadzki noted, "The Marxist−Leninist party gives political direction to the work of both the [SSOP] and the Government. [The SSOP] and government both work to carry out a common programme for building socialism. It does not mean, however, that under these conditions the importance of the [SSOP's] constitutional functions is reduced." Because of this dynamic position, the ruling parties of communist states, such as the Soviet Union, China, Poland, and Yugoslavia, moved in the direction of strengthening the role of the state organs of power in governance. Scholar Stephen White notes that the strengthening of the SSOP is not at the expense of the party's control of the state; in fact, it might strengthen it.

From the 1960s onwards, communist states have systematically clarified the party's leading role in state governance. The Soviet Union was the first to formalise this principle into law, doing so in the 1977 Soviet Constitution. Article 6 stated, "The leading and guiding force of Soviet society and the nucleus of its political system, of all state organisations and public organisations, is the Communist Party of the Soviet Union." Other states followed, such as Mongolia, which added the following sentence in its constitution: "In the Mongolian People's Republic, the guiding and directing force of society and of the state is the Mongolian People's Revolutionary Party, which is guided in its activities by the all-conquering theory of Marxism–Leninism."

In some communist states, such as China, this was done much later. At the 19th National Congress of the Chinese Communist Party, held in 2017, General Secretary Xi Jinping told the assembled delegates that "Party, government, military, civilian, and academic, north, south, east, west, and center, the Party leads everything." This was followed-up in 2018, when the 1st Session of the 13th National People's Congress amended the constitution and added the following sentence: "Leadership by the Communist Party of China is the defining feature of socialism with Chinese characteristics."

== Governance ==
=== Unified power and democratic centralism ===
The two core governing principles of state institutions in communist states are unified power and democratic centralism. Unified power informs the actual power structure of the state and the relationship between state organs. Democratic centralism emphasises the superiority of higher-level organs and how policies emanating from the top must be implemented downwards. For example, the 1977 Soviet Constitution states that the state institutions of the Soviet Union operated on democratic centralism. This meant that all state organs of power, from the lowest to the highest, were elected by and responsible to the people, and that lower organs had to follow the decisions made by higher ones. Unified power and democratic centralism is tightly interwoven, as was clear in the 1976 constitution of Cuba, which stated, "State organs are set up, function and carry out their activity based on the principles of socialist democracy, unity of power and democratic centralism." Fidel Castro clarified this relationship, stating, "There is a division of functions, but there is no [separation] of power. Power is one, the power of the working people exercised through the National Assembly and state [organs] dependent on it." French scholar Pierre Lavigne summed up the relationship between unified power and democratic centralism as follows, "people's sovereignty is the theoretical basis of the state, unity of state power is its derived legal technique, democratic centralism is its political method."

The ruling party is also organised on democratic centralist lines. Democratic centralism in the party emphasizes that decisions made by the highest organs are binding on lower-level organs and all party members. This means that all party members, including those serving as elected representatives of the SSOP, must follow the policies adopted by the communist party's leadership.

=== The constitution and constitutional supervision ===
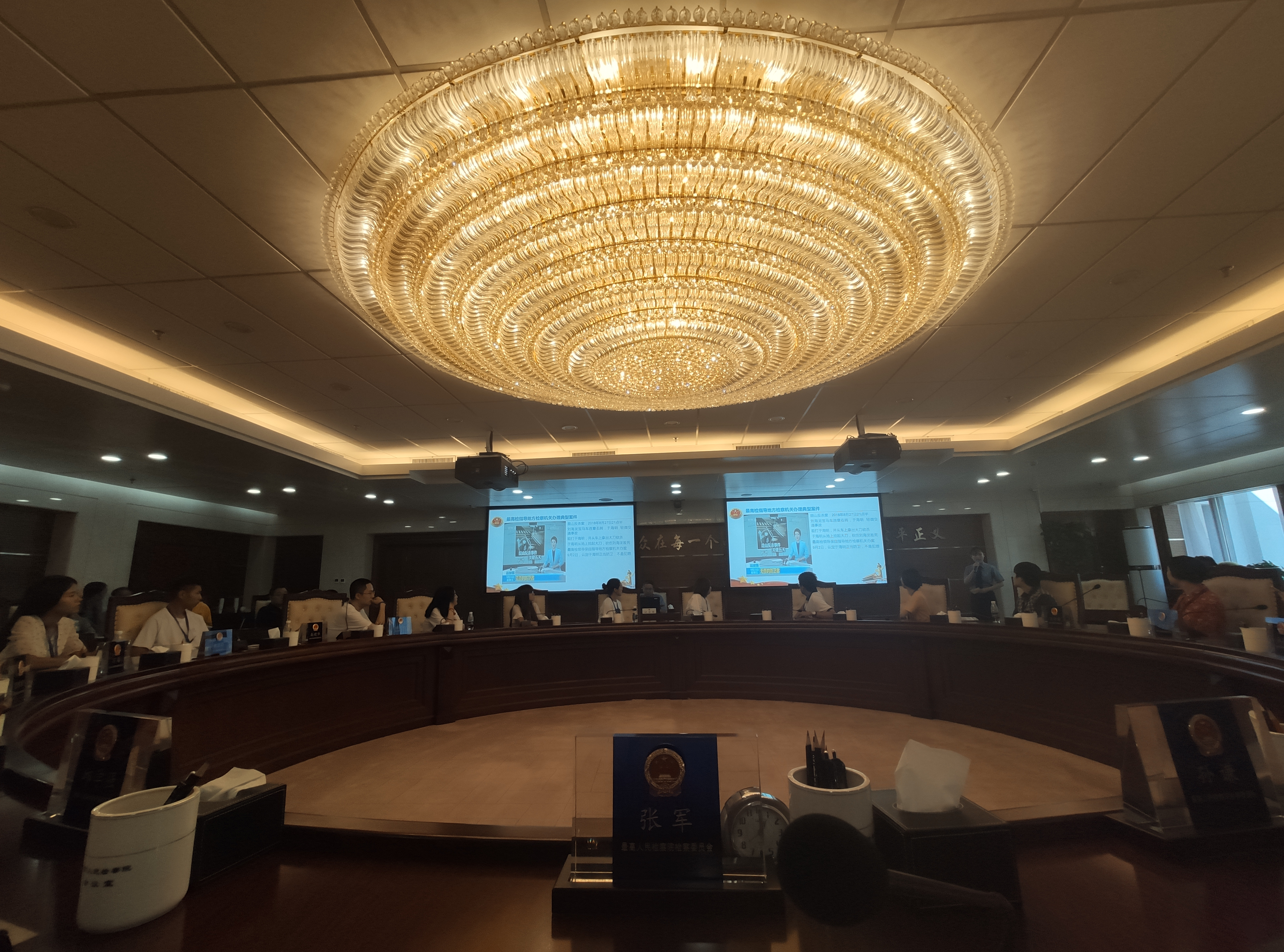
A picture of the Meeting Room of the Procuratorial Committee of China's Supreme People's Procuratorate. In China, as in every other communist state, no institution or law stands above the SSOP.

Historically, the first communist state constitution, adopted in 1918, granted the All-Russian Congress of Soviets and its Central Executive Committee authority over the adoption and amendment of the constitution. The 1936 Soviet constitution reaffirmed that only the Supreme Soviet could exercise this power. This model spread to other communist states. Later constitutions placed greater emphasis on popular participation for constitutional amendments. The constitutions of Laos and Vietnam required public consultation, and Cuba mandated national referendums for constitutional change.

In theoretical terms, communist constitutions were considered fundamental laws, distinct from ordinary legislation. For example, the Hungarian SSOP, known as the National Assembly, could pass both laws and resolutions, but the constitution was recognised as supreme, requiring a qualified majority for constitutional amendment. The idea of safeguarding the constitution in communist states was closely linked to socialist legality: the obligation of state organs and citizens to observe the constitution as binding law. Unlike liberal systems with judicial review, communist states rejected any institutions that could restrict the SSOP's legal power of decision-making. Safeguarding constitutionalism was considered a shared responsibility. The procuracy supervised legality in state organs, while the party ensured consistency with constitutional principles. Legislative committees could also monitor constitutionality, but constitutional courts, common in liberal states, were rejected as incompatible with the supremacy of the SSOP. Yugoslavia and, later, Czechoslovakia were exceptions, though their constitutional courts were established as state organs subordinate to the SSOP. Ultimately, these courts derived state power from adoption by the SSOP, regulated fundamental aspects of political and economic life, and occupied the highest place in the legal hierarchy.

== Organisation ==
=== Sessions ===
==== Activity ====
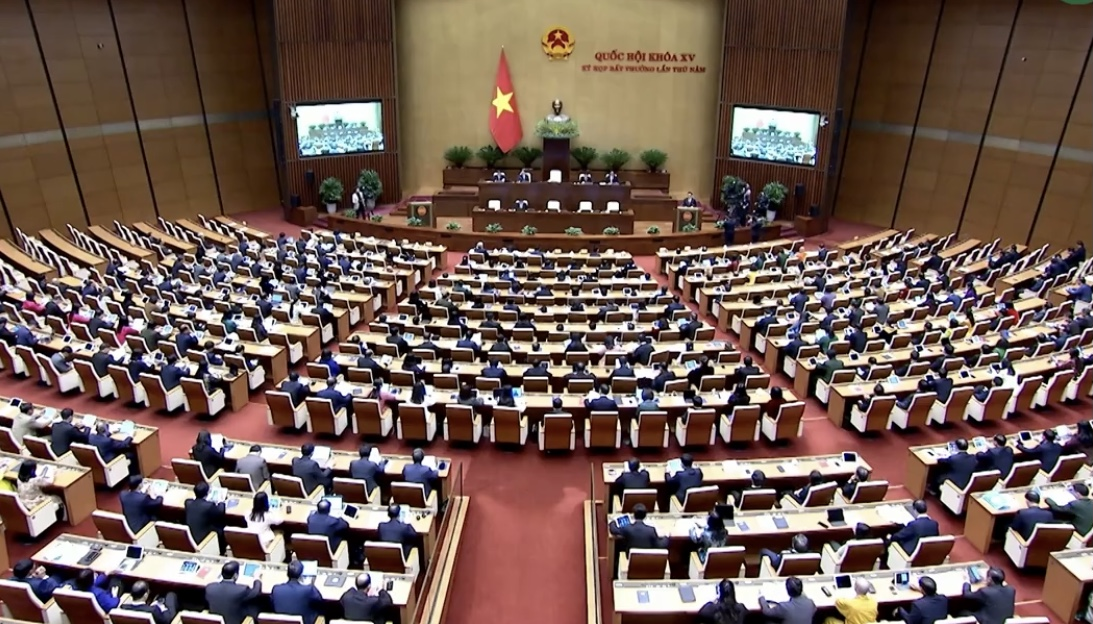
A picture from the opening of the 5th Extraordinary Session of the 15th National Assembly of Vietnam, held in January 2024. The National Assembly is Vietnam's SSOP.

The SSOP rarely convenes, usually between once, twice or three times a year. For example, in former communist Eastern Europe, the Supreme Soviet of the Soviet Union convened once or twice a year, the Supreme People's Assembly of the Albania, the Federal Assembly of Czechoslovakia, and the People's Chamber of East Germany convened twice a year, the National Assembly of Bulgaria and the National Assembly of Hungary, convened four times, and the Sejm of Poland and the Assembly of Yugoslavia convened more than four times a year. These sessions usually lasted only a couple of days.

A constituent session of a new term of a supreme state organ is virtually identical from state to state. It is mainly focused on electing the state leadership. The process went through several stages. For example, in communist Hungary, the process (as in other states) began with the holding of national elections of deputies, which were held on 8 June 1980. About two weeks later, on 24 June, the 12th Central Committee of the Hungarian Socialist Workers' Party (HSWP) convened to discuss the personnel of state organs.

The HSWP then sent General Secretary János Kádár to the Patriotic People's Front, the main transmission belt organisation, on 26 June to get its approval for the decisions taken by the aforementioned Central Committee session: the party's proposal was adopted unanimously. The next day, the Hungarian SSOP convened for its constituent session and started proceedings by electing its permanent organ, known as the Presidential Council. Upon its election, the permanent organ convened and issued a decree on the merger of government ministries and submitted its recommendations for the composition of the executive organ, the judicial organ, and the procuratorial organ. The session approved the recommendations unanimously.

Sessions can be convened to adopt laws and elect officials, but also to listen to a report by a state organ. For example, no laws were adopted or amended at a session of the Bulgarian SSOP on 21 March 1981. In other cases, such as the 20−22 December 1977 session of Bulgaria's SSOP, the elected representatives convened to approve decrees issued by the permanent organ since the last session of the SSOP. This session also by-elected new deputies to the SSOP since some incumbent deputies had died since the last session.

The 7th Sejm, which lasted from 1976 to 1980, convened for 28 sessions and adopted 42 laws and four decrees, which was lower than the 6th Sejm, which approved 103 laws and 11 decrees. The Hungarian SSOP also adopted, in its 1971−1975 term, 23 laws. In comparison, the Hungarian permanent organ adopted 30 laws and decrees in the first 18 months of the electoral term. The same tendency can be discerned, according to Hazan, in Poland and other communist states: the permanent organ took over the legislative functions of the sessions of the SSOP. In cases where the SSOP enacted many changes, as the 30−31 March 1982 session of the Bulgarian SSOP did, there was little discussion. That session unanimously adopted amendments to 130 articles of the penal code without debate.

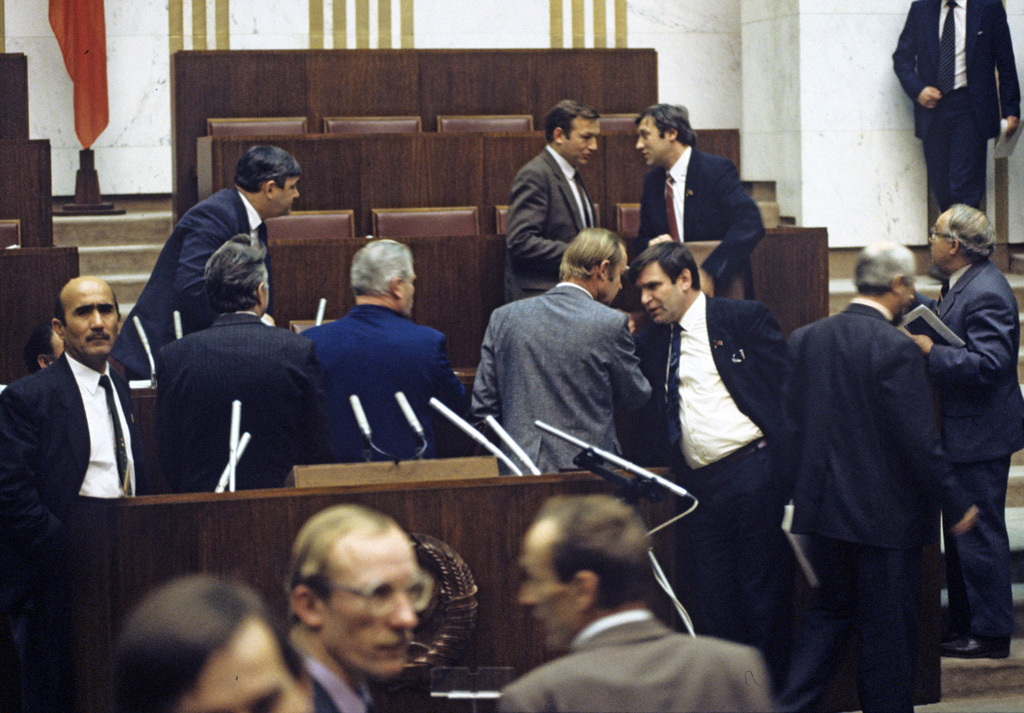
A picture taken on 12 December 1991 at one of the last meetings of the Soviet SSOP before the dissolution of the Soviet Union.

The only major agenda item of the 20−22 December 1977 session of Bulgaria's SSOP was the report by the executive organ presented by Stanko Todorov, the chairman of the Council of Ministers. This was a normal occurrence in the European communist states and is still a prominent feature of the existing communist states. In the report, the head of government normally informs the SSOP on the importance of implementing the decisions of the communist party and the tasks for the current year. Shortcomings and weaknesses can be admitted, but the overall focus is on accomplishments. These were designated as important state events, but highly symbolic. Todorov, as the Bulgarian head of government, was constitutionally bound to report on the government's activity to the SSOP. Despite the constitutional provision, the Bulgarian head of government failed to report on the government's activities in 1974, 1976, 1980, 1981, and 1982. No reasons were ever provided, and no one appeared to question why that was the case, at least in public, according to academic Baruch Hazan.

Overt interference by the communist party in the activities of the SSOP is common in communist state politics. For example, at the 11th Session of the 7th National Assembly (the Bulgarian SSOP), held on 30−31 October 1979, its elected members voted unanimously to amend a law on scientific degrees and titles. The amendments were proposed by Naco Papazov, the chairman of the Committee on Science and Technological Progress, and only two representatives commented on it, making only minor suggestions. The amendments were adopted, but the following day, Vladimir Bonev, the chair of the Bulgarian SSOP, read aloud a letter from Todor Zhivkov, the general secretary of the Central Committee of the Bulgarian Communist Party, that the discussions from the day before were "interesting" and, therefore, that the bill should be withdrawn so as to give them serious attention.

Zhivkov proposed sending the bill to the Legislative Commission of the SSOP to study them further. Zhivkov also suggested that instead of amending the bill, as the SSOP had done, an entirely new law should be adopted, and the proposed bill be postponed. The Council of Ministers, the executive organ of the SSOP, then went on to withdraw the bill, and the SSOP approved the withdrawal unanimously.

At the 15th Session of the Czechoslovak Federal Assembly elected in 1976, held on 9−10 April 1980, the main agenda item was the report delivered by Lubomír Štrougal, the chairman of the Council of Ministers. During the debate on the report, seventeen individuals spoke, most of whom merely repeated large parts of the report. Štrougal was asked two questions: one on the preparations of the five-year plan and another on domestic food supplies. He responded that the five-year plan was going according to plan and that he would seek to improve domestic food supplies. The session then went on to adopt the report unanimously.

==== Institutional evolution ====
Originally, proceedings like these were the norm in the supreme state organs of power in communist Europe, and they were mostly characterised by their short, routine, and efficient sessions that produced unanimous approval of proposals. Unlike liberal democratic legislatures, votes of no confidence, heated debates between competing views, or competitive elections were not a feature of the supreme state organs of power. However, this slowly began to change, starting with institutional reforms instigated in Yugoslavia after the Tito–Stalin split of 1948.

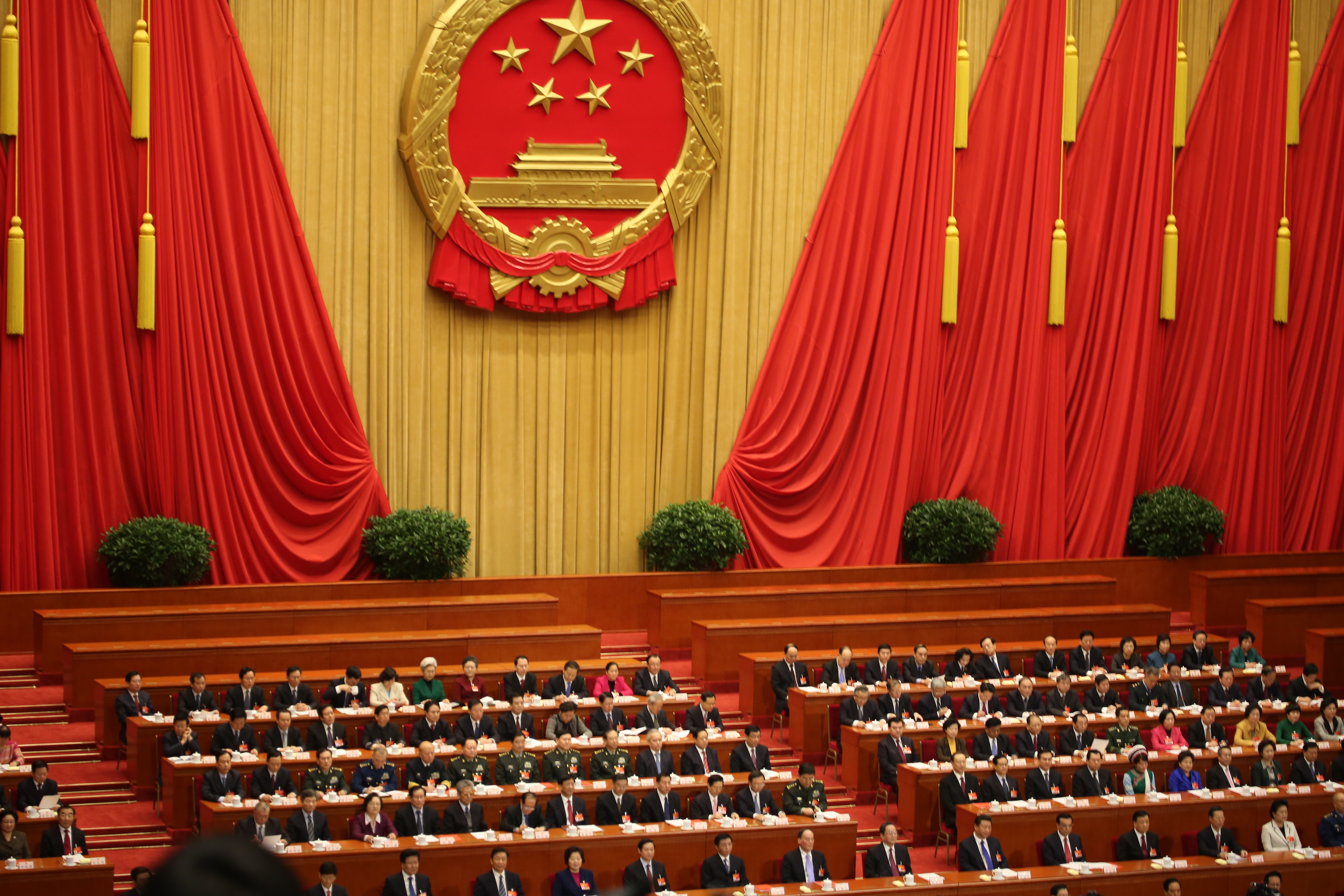
A picture from the closing ceremony of the 3rd Session of the 12th National People's Congress (NPC), dated 15 March 2015. The NPC is China's SSOP.

Yugoslavia became the first communist state to experience a vote of no confidence in December 1966. In the Socialist Republic of Slovenia, a constituent republic of Yugoslavia, the Chamber on Health and Welfare of the Slovene state organ of power voted down the Executive Council's (the government) proposal on social insurance. It led to Janko Smole, the president of the Slovene Executive Council, to offer his resignation. However, in a compromise, the National Assembly later reversed its decision, and the Executive Council amended its proposal. But Smole went on to leave office in 1967 and was replaced by Stane Kavčič. A similar event took place in October 1978, when the Chamber of Republics and Provinces of the Assembly, the federal-level SSOP of Yugoslavia, rejected the proposed economic plan for 1979 of the Federal Executive Council, headed by Veselin Đuranović, arguing that it was "too general, unclear and undefined, and therefore inadequate for effective implementation of the economic development policy." Similarly to the 1966 incident, the Federal Executive Council responded by amending its draft and the proposal was eventually accepted.

The Polish crisis of 1980–1981, which was an outgrowth of the economic crisis the country was experiencing, caused the resignation of Edward Gierek as first secretary of the Central Committee of the Polish United Workers' Party. The pressure on the political system caused the Polish SSOP, the Sejm, to take a more critical position towards the party. In late 1980, the Sejm did not unanimously adopt the economic plan for 1981, and instead transferred the case to the special committees for further analysis. This adoption was conditional, and it was noted in the official bulletin: "The Sejm passed a motion provisionally approving the budget, which, in case of the central budget, will give it validity for the first quarter of the year. The Sejm preferred to give provisional approval rather than to hastily approve the full plan and budget, to the detriment of their analysis and possible correction." During proceedings, the elected representatives questioned Henryk Kisiel, the deputy chairman of the Polish executive organ, and Marian Krzak, the finance minister, after they presented the 1981 plan and state budget. This question time, uncharacteristically, lasted for two and a half hours, and dealt with a plethora of questions.

By December 1981, the Polish SSOP had begun criticising the executive organ, and indirectly the party leadership, at its sessions. At the December session, several elected representatives insisted that the sessions of the Polish SSOP should have the opportunity to examine the preliminary drafts of the annual economic plan and state budget rather than just the finalised proposals, which was an unstated communist state norm. The session also called for the SSOP to be involved in all personnel changes in the state executive organ, rather than merely being notified of changes, marking a departure from a traditional communist practice. Furthermore, the SSOP insisted that ministers must attend meetings of the special committees when requested.

Although these demands were not met, the session on 12 February 1981, which elected the executive and permanent organs for the new term, witnessed an election that deviated from the norms of the communist state once again. A total of 33 members of the supreme state organ opposed the recall of Krzysztof Kruszewski as the minister of education and training, while 35 members abstained from voting. In the case of Tadeusz Skwirzyński, the minister of forestry and the timber industry, seven members voted against his recall, and fifteen abstained. Other objections were raised during the session, which was broadcast live by Radio Warszawa.

In recent years, the way in which the supreme state organs of power conduct their business has changed in the existing communist states. Albeit there are still differences between states. For example, China's 13th National People's Congress sat from 2018 until 2023, was composed of 2980 deputies, and convened for five meetings that lasted, in total, 48 days. In between those sessions, its permanent organ, the NPC Standing Committee, led legislative work. In Vietnam, the 14th National Assembly, which was in session from 2016 to 2021, had 496 deputies and convened for 11 meetings totaling 299 days. Similarly to the 13th NPC, its permanent organ led work between these sessions. The eighth electoral term of the Laotian SSOP, which met from 2016 to 2021, had 148 deputies and convened ten sessions, totalling 223 days. However, the Chinese SSOP convenes more than Cuba's National Assembly of People's Power and North Korea's Supreme People's Assembly. Cuba's 9th National Assembly of People's Power (2018–2023) convened for fifteen meetings totalling 19 days, while North Korea's 13th Supreme People's Assembly (2014–2019) convened six meetings totalling six days.

Vietnam's SSOP is more active and allows for more active sessions than its communist state counterparts. For example, Vietnam's SSOP passed a law allowing transgender people to change gender in 2017: 282 representatives voted for the bill, while 84 opposed it. During the debate on whether to establish a constitutional council, Nguyễn Sinh Hùng, a politburo and chair of the SSOP, voiced support for it. In contrast, Trần Đại Quang, another politburo member and the public security minister, voiced his opposition. To gain a clearer understanding of the opposing sides' strength, the SSOP held a preliminary vote on establishing a constitutional review organ, with 216 voting against and 141 voting in favor.

Moreover, Vietnam's SSOP organises question times of every central state officeholder (including the prime minister) at its sessions. Proceedings are televised live, with criticism by elected representatives of government mishandling and corruption a typical occurrence, and regular votes of no confidence occur. For example, on 11 June 2013, Vietnam's SSOP organised a vote of confidence, in which 42 per cent, 32 per cent, and 25 per cent of representatives voted that they had low confidence in Minister of Industry and Trade Vũ Huy Hoàng, State Bank governor Nguyễn Văn Bình, and Prime Minister Nguyễn Tấn Dũng, respectively. Vietnam's SSOP has also rejected nominees for state positions.

=== Permanent organ ===
According to the system of our constitution, the U.S.S.R. should not have an individual president elected by the entire population on an equal basis with the Supreme Soviet, who might attempt to stand out against the Supreme Soviet. In the U.S.S.R. the president is a collective one — the Presidium of the Supreme Soviet, which also includes the chairman of the Presidium of the Supreme Soviet, elected not by the entire population but by the Supreme Soviet and accountable to the Supreme Soviet.

— Joseph Stalin, in his speech, "On the Draft Constitution of the U.S.S.R.".

The permanent organ of an SSOP is elected at the first session of the SSOP's new term. Since the SSOP only convenes for a few days each year, most of its duties are delegated to its permanent organ, which can meet up to several times a month. The most common names given to these organs are Standing Committee, Presidium, State Council, and Council of State. In most cases, the permanent organ of the SSOP was designated as the collective state presidency. In some countries, such as in the Socialist Republic of Romania and the People's Republic of Angola, the state president as head of state served ex officio as chairman of the permanent organ.

When he is not concurrently designated as head of state, the chair of a permanent organ has no distinct powers other than chairing the sessions. Unlike common practice in liberal democratic states, the permanent organ chair could not veto the SSOP or dissolve it. Theoretically, the SSOP could remove the entirety of the presidium or change its composition as it pleased. Laws adopted by the SSOP and its permanent organ had to be promulgated, in the Soviet Union at least, through a signature by the permanent organ chair. However, in practice, the chair of the permanent organ was treated by foreign states as the head of state since the officeholder often was sent on missions to represent the state abroad.

The first communist states to establish the office of president were Czechoslovakia and East Germany. The president of Czechoslovakia was quite powerful, and could convene, postpone, and dissolve the Czechoslovak SSOP. The East German presidency, like the Czechoslovak presidency, was elected by the SSOP, but unlike its Czechoslovak counterpart, was only empowered to represent the state abroad and promulgate laws by signature alongside the head of government. The People's Republic of China (PRC) also established a presidency, first known as the chairman of the People's Republic of China and later reestablished in 1982 as state president. Mao Zedong, the first leader of the PRC, rejected that the chairmanship functioned as a head of state, arguing instead that the major differences between the Soviet system and the Chinese was that the chairman acted as a representative of the state collective leadership. Liu Shaoqi, Mao's deputy, in his report on the 1954 Constitution of China, stated that the powers of the Chinese head of state was jointly exercised by the permanent organ, the Standing Committee of the National People's Congress, and the state chairman. The president has no independent powers other than those bestowed by China's permanent organ.

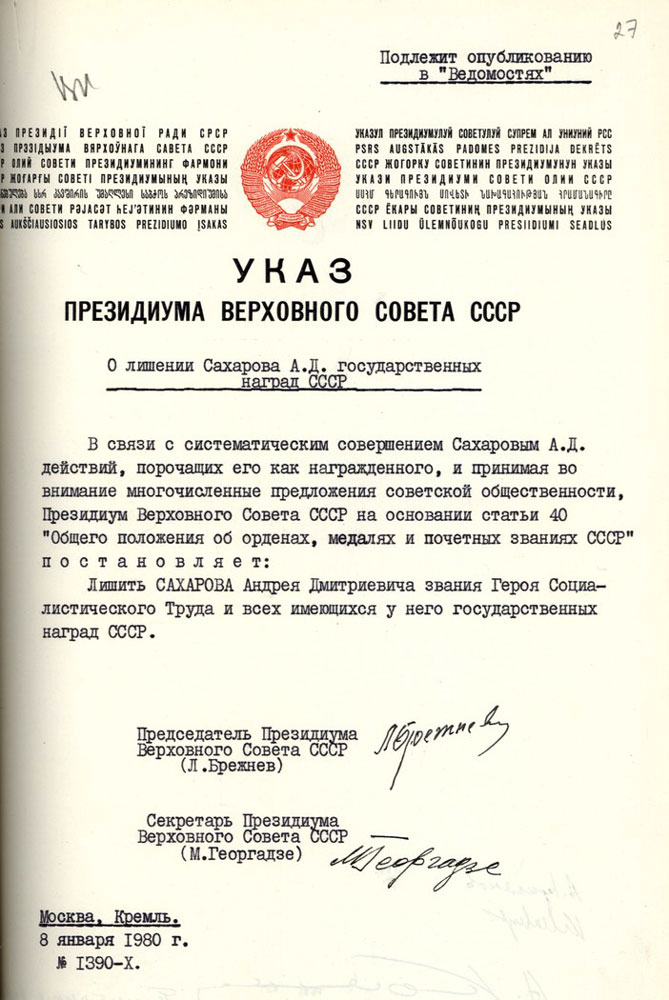
A decree issued by the Soviet permanent organ, the Presidium of the All-Union Supreme Soviet.

To be eligible for election to a permanent organ, one must already be a member of the SSOP. As part of the delegation of power, the permanent organs holds legislative powers, such as issuing decrees, representing the state abroad, interpreting the laws, organising national elections, convoking the sessions of the SSOP, holding referendums, adopting treaties, appointing and recalling diplomatic representatives, and representing the SSOP when it is not in session. While it is officially accountable to the sessions of the SSOP, the permanent organ has usually amassed so much power that the supreme state organ of power has failed to hold the members of the permanent organ accountable.

The permanent organ is firmly under the party's control. However, in circumstances where more than one party exists, the other parties are usually represented in the membership. In some instances, they hold important positions within the permanent organ. For example, Petur Tanchev as leader of the Bulgarian Agrarian National Union served as first deputy chairman. In East Germany, Gerald Götting, the leader of the Christian Democratic Union, Heinrich Homann, chairman of the National Democratic Party, and Manfred Gerlach, as leader of the Liberal Democratic Party served as deputy chairmen of the State Council. The same goes for Poland, where in 1985, Tadeusz Młyńczak from the Alliance of Democrats and Zdzisław Tomal from the United Peasants' Party concurrently served as deputy chairs of the State Council.

The permanent organs of communist states share many common features. For example, the Presidium of Albania's Supreme People's Assembly was composed of a chair, two vice chairs, one secretary, and about ten members. In Bulgaria, the State Council was composed of 29 members, of which one served as chair, one as first deputy chair, three deputy chairs, and one secretary. The Hungarian People's Republic named its permanent organ the Presidential Council, and it was composed of about 21 members, of which one served as chair, two as deputy chairs, and one as secretary.

==== Special committees ====
The special committees are established by the sessions of the SSOP, and their work is coordinated and led by the permanent organ. The modern system of special committees of the SSOP was established in 1938 during the 1st Session of the 1st Supreme Soviet. It established eight special committees, of which four were established in the lower house and the other four in the upper house. During its first years, there were few signs of activity from the special committees, and their influence on Soviet law-making was, according to academic Robert W. Siegler, negligible. However, with Stalin's death in 1953, power became gradually more dispersed, but the committee system remained virtually unchanged until 1966. The 1st Session of the 7th Supreme Soviet established twelve new commissions and expanded the size of the existing ones. At the 1st Session of the 9th Supreme Soviet, held in 1974, the number of special committees was increased to 28. This period significantly increased their importance and role in law-making: laws, decrees, and other issues were discussed at meetings of the special committees instead of the sessions of the SSOP.

The special committees of the supreme state organs of power have gained more influence with time. They have a sizeable role in determining the state budget and approving economic plans in these states. These committees use their institutional position to gain help from academic institutions, individual specialists, the broader public, and transmission belt organisations, to help legislate properly. According to Stephen White, in the Soviet Union, the special committee's impact "upon educational, environmental, budgetary and other matters [was] often considerable."

Despite their lack of autonomy, the supreme state organs of power hold the other state organs to account and supervise their work in a non-oppositional way. Accountability work is mainly the responsibility of special committees in communist states. They achieve this by evaluating a given state organ's performance and legal compliance. The special committees are normally empowered to call officials in for questioning and could initiate investigations on the implementation and effects of state policies. They are typically authorised to write reports that act as a recommendation to a specific state organ. A written report had to be given an official response by the state organ in question, in which it had to inform the special committee on the progress of policy implementation and possible countermeasures.

=== Executive organ ===
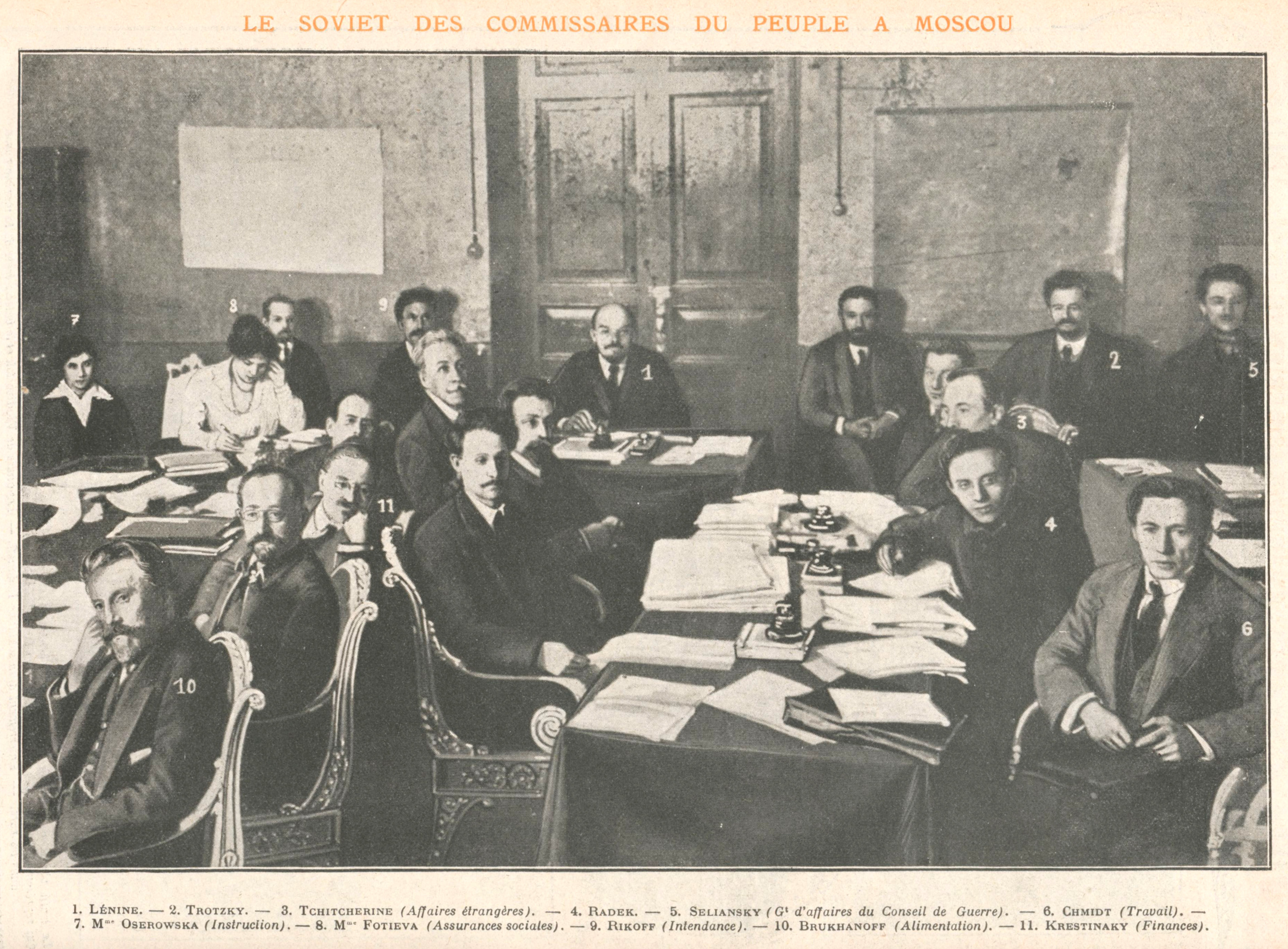
The Soviet supreme executive and administrative organ under Lenin's leadership as depicted in 1920.

The executive and administrative organ of the state is most often denoted as an internal organ of the SSOP (as in China, East Germany, North Korea, Vietnam, and Yugoslavia). However, in other states, such as Cuba, Czechoslovakia, Poland, Romania, and the Soviet Union, it was designated most commonly as "the supreme executive and administrative state organ of power" or simply as "the supreme executive state organ of power", meaning that it is part of the unified state apparatus and formally inferior to the SSOP.

These organs were formally designated as the governments of their respective countries and were most commonly given the name "Council of Ministers", though Czechoslovakia's was known as the government and Yugoslavia's was designated as the Federal Executive Council. In the existing communist states, the executive organ has a plethora of designations: as the State Council in China, as the government in Laos and Vietnam, as the Council of Ministers in Cuba, and as the Cabinet in North Korea. The head of the executive organ was equivalent in rank to a prime minister in non-communist systems.

Per unified power, the executive organ is subordinate to the SSOP. However, in reality, since the very establishment of the first communist state in Russia, the executive organ has been more powerful than the SSOP, according to scholar Georg Brunner. Across most of the communist world, the executive organ is the most powerful state organ. In cases where it is not, the permanent organ most often acts as the most powerful state organ. The reason for its preeminent position is that the executive organ is responsible for the state administrative structures, meaning ministries, departments, and other administrative units. In certain cases, the executive organ developed from being a mere administrative decision coordinator to its prime instigator.

There have been cases in communist history in which the party leader concurrently served as the head of the executive organ. Vladimir Lenin served as both the party's informal leader and the executive organ's head. After his death, Alexey Rykov served as head of government until Joseph Stalin's protege, Vyacheslav Molotov, took power. At the height of his powers, Stalin concurrently served as party general secretary and head of the executive organ. Having the party leader serve concurrently as head of government was common in the late 1940s and early 1950s in communist Europe. However, this norm was eventually discarded since it was believed to centralise too much power in one person. Ever since, the norm has been that the party leader and the head of the executive organ are two distinct individuals.

=== Unified state apparatus ===
The SSOP heads the unified state apparatus, meaning the state is organised as a single branch of government where all powers emanate from the organs of state power. This is why, for example, the 1936 Soviet constitution designates the Supreme Soviet as the SSOP: it holds the supreme powers of the state. All other state organs are inferior to the SSOP, which acts as the chief lawmaker and the pinnacle of the constitutional system. This also means, as was the case in the Soviet Union, that the SSOP controlled the lower-level soviets (state organs of power). From a Marxist−Leninist perspective, the SSOP personifies the people's will. According to Andrey Vyshinsky, a leading Soviet legal theorist who served as the Procurator General of the Soviet Union, power is "personified in the [SSOP], the will of the people—of the masses of millions of workers, peasants and intellectuals—finds expression." In communist states, all state organs are elected by the SSOP, which is either directly elected through controlled elections, as in the Soviet Union, or indirectly elected, as in China.

The supreme judicial organ of communist states is the supreme court. It is elected at the sessions of the SSOP and is held accountable to the SSOP and its permanent organ. The permanent organ controls the supreme judicial organ by supervising its activities and interpreting laws. It was also not uncommon that there was an overlap in personnel between the SSOP and the supreme judicial organ. For example, Alexander Gorkin, the longstanding president of the Supreme Court of the Soviet Union, began working for the Soviet Central Committee in 1930 before starting work in the SSOP, most prominently as the secretary of the Soviet permanent organ. After working there for 20 years, Gorkin was elected as the president of the Supreme Court in 1957.

The supreme procuratorial organ of a communist state is often known as the procuracy, as in Vietnam's Supreme People's Procuracy or the Office of the Procurator General in the Soviet Union. Like the supreme judicial organ, the procuracy's leadership is elected during sessions of the SSOP. It is accountable to both the SSOP and its permanent organ. While it is the highest prosecutorial organ of communist states, the permanent organ is also nominally vested with prosecutorial authority. It's also inferior to the permanent organ, considering the former adopts and interprets the laws, and supervises the procuracy's work.

== Membership ==
=== Elections ===
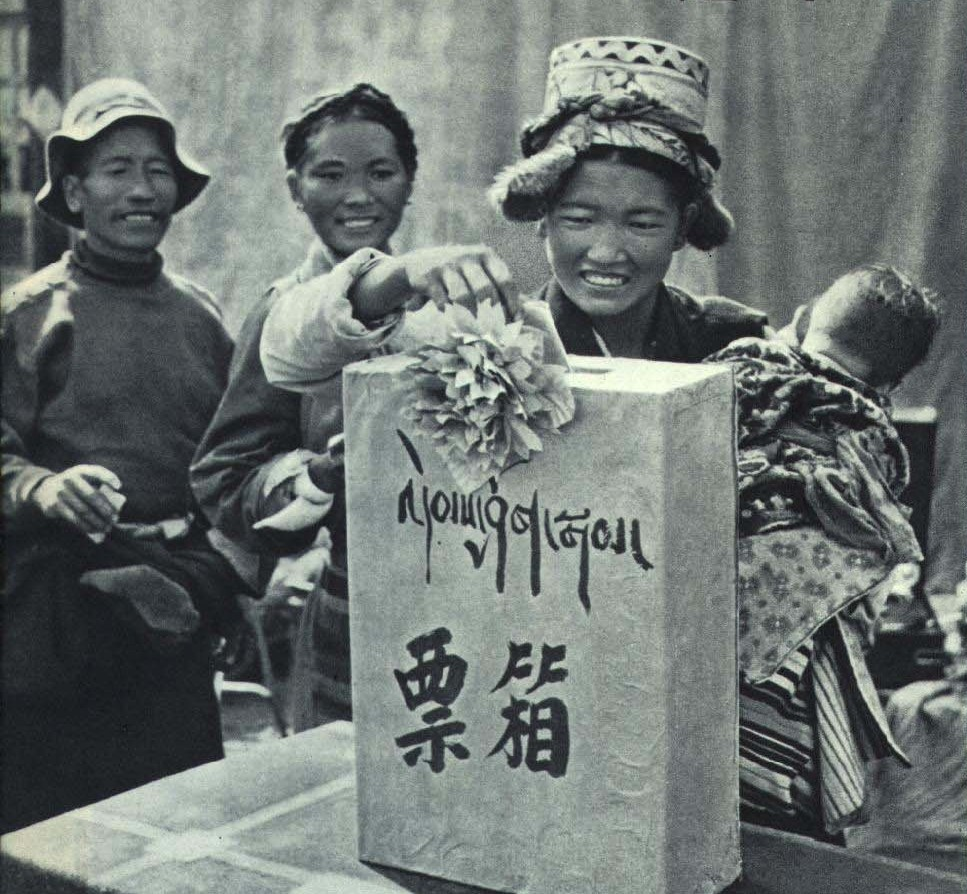
A picture depicting a vote taking place in the Tibet Autonomous Region of China in 1963.

Elections in communist states have different functions from those in liberal democratic states. However, despite their inherent differences, that does not mean, according to academics George Sakwa and Martin Crouch, that one can "necessarily reduce such elections to insignificant rituals, or make their study pointless." Communist state elections can, in some cases, give a clue to the level of political participation in the given society, and the relationship between the state and the party.

Academics Martin Harrop and William L. Miller argue that communist states organised two forms of elections: elections by acclamation and candidate-choice elections. In the first, there was an identical number of candidates as seats up for election in the SSOP. In the candidate-choice format, there were more candidates than seats up for election. They theorised that the candidate-choice format increased the importance of elections and their influence on policy.

Soviet Russia, and later the Soviet Union, conceived the first model of communist state elections: elections by acclamation. The electoral system outlined in the 1936 Soviet constitution greatly influenced the communist world. In the elections held under Stalin's leadership, there was an identical number of candidates as seats up for election in the SSOP. For example, Poland organised two elections based on this model: the 1947 and 1952 elections. In the 1947 elections, 99,8% of voters voted for the official candidate list, while in the 1952 election, 95,03% of voters did.

The Soviet electoral system was less free than its liberal democratic counterparts, but the popular participation rate was higher. For example, during the 1974 elections, there were more than 50,000 electoral entities with more than 2.2 million seats up for election. Soviet elections were not organised by bureaucrats but by citizens, and in the 1975 elections, more than nine million people participated in their organisation. While all these participants worked under the party's stewardship, "it is none the less true", according to Harrop and Miller, "that citizen involvement in Soviet elections is much greater than in the West." In contrast to liberal democratic elections, the actual elections, when by acclamation, are the least interesting feature. The population can, theoretically, influence who stands for election, but when that candidate is chosen, the candidate does not compete with other candidates for votes, and as in the Soviet Union, stood as a representative for the Bloc of Communists and Non-Partisans.

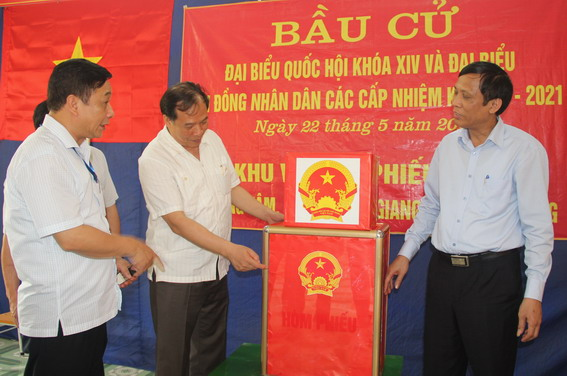
Voters taking part in the 2016 election of deputies to Vietnam's SSOP and lower-level state organs of power.

Poland became the first communist state to experiment with the candidate-choice format. In 1957, it instituted a system in which electors could nominate candidates. China, East Germany, Hungary, and Yugoslavia also experimented with the candidate-choice format. According to Harrop and Miller, Poland and East Germany operated a candidate-choice format that rigged the vote in favour of the communist party and the popular front. For example, in Poland, this was done by listing the preferred candidates at the top of the ballot paper and making an unmarked ballot synonymous with votes for the top candidates. Considering the political sensitivity of voting against the list, many voters preferred to vote without marking the ballot.

The other candidate-choice format, instituted in Yugoslavia, Romania, and Hungary, avoided this inbuilt bias. However, these states tried to make these elections as uncompetitive as possible: communist party candidates, for example, did not stand for election against candidates from non-oppositional satellite parties. Candidates for election were nominated in constituencies with other candidates of similar rank. However, these rules were more strictly applied nationally, and lower-level elections were freer.

The third form of the candidate-choice model was established in 1983. An amendment to Hungary's electoral law called for contested elections for over 50 percent of the seats in the SSOP. The remaining seats were elected from a list made by the communist party and the national front. In the competitive seats, candidates needed to gain more than 50 percent of the votes to be elected. In the 1985 elections, 98 of the 172 incumbents who stood for elections in the competitive constituencies were re-elected, 54 lost outright, and 20 more lost in a run-off. Despite voters being free to elect their preferred candidate, all the candidates subscribed to the communist party and the National Front programme.

Elections to the supreme state organs of power were usually held at four- or five-year intervals. In some countries, such as Poland and the Soviet Union, direct elections were organised while in others, such as China, elections are indirect. The permanent organ of the SSOP was responsible for calling the elections and setting up an electoral commission that supervised the election. In communist states with a popular front, such as Poland's National Unity Front and the Vietnamese Fatherland Front, these organisations set up the candidate lists. The intention is that this list would unite all the different social forces behind the state.

=== Imperative mandates and recall ===
Karl Marx was an adherent of imperative mandates and recall elections that empowered voters to remove their elected representatives at any time. He believed this was essential to ensure that the elected representatives ruled on behalf of a clear majority of the people and not vested interests. The Paris Commune based its electoral system on the imperative mandate, strengthening Marx's support for it. Marx wrote in his book, The Civil War in France, that the Paris Commune was correct in instituting elections based on universal suffrage in which the elected were "responsible and revocable at short terms" to the electors, noting that this ensured that "each [elected] representative [would] be at any time revocable and bound by the mandat impératif [imperative mandate] of his constituents." This, Marx argued, would end the situation in which elected representatives in liberal democracies used "three or six years [...] to misrepresent the people' and constituents only being able to replace them once in many years."

A draft decree authored by Vladimir Lenin in 1917 claims that no elective institution or representative assembly can be regarded as democratic and representative of the people's interests unless the people have the right to recall their elected representatives, a right that is accepted and exercised. The draft argues that this democratic principle applies to all representative assemblies without exception. This was written into the constitutions of all communist states. For example, the 1977 Soviet constitution states, "Deputies who have not justified the confidence of their constituents may be recalled at any time by decision of a majority of the electors in accordance with the procedure established by law." In cases where indirect elections to the SSOP are the norm, as in China, the right of recall is given to the electoral entity that elected the representative.

Despite this right, the communist state systems made it difficult for electors to recall their representatives. Electors and the organisations that nominated the candidate have the right to nominate someone for recall. The decision to actually recall someone was in the hands of the permanent organ of the state organ of power in question. There are instances of successful recall challenges in communist states, but they focus on the candidate's work failure or misdemeanours. Recall does not occur based on policy differences.

== See also ==
- Supreme executive and administrative organ
