= Tiamzon =

Tiamzón is a Hispanized Hokkien-language surname.

== Notable people ==
- Benito Tiamzon (1951–2022), Filipino leftist political organizer
- Ernestine Tiamzon (born 1997), Filipino-Canadian volleyball athlete
- Nicole Tiamzon (born 1995), Filipino volleyball player
- Wilma Tiamzon (1952–2022), Filipino leftist political organizer

== See also ==
- Timson, a similarly spelled surname
- Timpson (surname), another similar surname
- Hispanized Filipino-Chinese surnames
