= Journal of Eurasian Studies =

Academic journal

- Discipline: Area studies
- Language: English
- Edited by: Gu Ho Eom, Stephen White

Publication details
- History: 2010–present
- Publisher: SAGE Publishing on behalf of Hanyang University (South Korea)
- Frequency: Biannually
- Open access: Yes
- License: CC BY-NC 4.0

Standard abbreviations
- ISO 4: J. Eurasian Stud.

Indexing
- ISSN: 1879-3665 (print); 1879-3673 (web)
- LCCN: 2010263310
- OCLC no.: 8464690633

Links
- Journal homepage; Online access and archives

The Journal of Eurasian Studies is a biannual peer-reviewed academic journal covering research on the Eurasian region. It was established in 2010 by the Asia-Pacific Research Center of Hanyang University. From 2010 to 2018, the department published it in association with Elsevier; since 2019 it has been published by SAGE Publishing.

== Abstracting and indexing ==
The journal is abstracted and indexed in the Index Islamicus and Scopus.

== Editors-in-chief ==
The following persons are or have been editor-in-chief:

- Gu Ho Eom (Hanyang University) and Stephen White (Glasgow University; current)
- Florian Farkas (former)
