= Special committees of the supreme state organ of power =

The special committees of a communist state are tasked with supporting the legislative and supervisory responsibilities of the supreme state organ of power, which it is elected by and is accountable to. They provide technical expertise, policy continuity, and functional specialisation within the communist state framework. These committees typically focus on specific domains, such as legal affairs, finance, foreign relations, and ethnic policy. They are responsible for reviewing legislative drafts, monitoring policy implementation, and conducting investigations or consultations as needed. While the scope and autonomy of these committees vary across communist states, their structural role remains largely consistent: to process and mediate policy issues in line with state-party directives.

== Overview ==
The special committees are established by the sessions of the supreme state organ of power, and their work is coordinated and led by the permanent organ. The modern system of special committees of the supreme state organ of power was established in 1938 during the 1st Session of the 1st Supreme Soviet. It established eight special committees, of which four were established in the lower house and the other four in the upper house. During its first years, there were few signs of activity from the special committees, and their influence on Soviet law-making was, according to academic Robert W. Siegler, negligible. However, with Joseph Stalin's death in 1953, power became gradually more dispersed, but the committee system remained virtually unchanged until 1966. The 1st Session of the 7th Supreme Soviet established twelve new commissions and expanded the size of the existing ones. At the 1st Session of the 9th Supreme Soviet, held in 1974, the number of special committees increased to 28. This period significantly increased their importance and role in law-making: laws, decrees, and other issues were discussed at meetings of the special committees instead of the sessions of the supreme state organ of power.

The special committees of the supreme state organs of power have gained more influence with time. They have a sizeable role in determining the state budget and approving economic plans in these states. These committees utilise their institutional position to solicit assistance from academic institutions, individual specialists, the broader public, and transmission belt organisations, thereby facilitating the development of proper legislation. According to Stephen White, in the Soviet Union, the special committee's impact "upon educational, environmental, budgetary and other matters [was] often considerable."

Despite their lack of autonomy, the supreme state organs of power hold the other state organs accountable and supervise their work in a non-oppositional manner. Accountability work is mainly the responsibility of special committees in communist states. They achieved this by evaluating the performance and legal compliance of a given state organ. The special committees are normally empowered to call officials in for questioning and could initiate investigations on the implementation and effects of state policies. They are typically authorised to write reports that serve as recommendations to a specific state organ. A written report had to be given an official response by the state organ in question, in which it had to inform the special committee on the progress of policy implementation and possible countermeasures.

== Notes and References ==
=== Books ===
- Siegler, Robert W. (1982). The Standing Commissions of the Supreme Soviet: Effective Co-optation. Praeger Scientific. ISBN 0-03-060092-8.

=== Book chapters ===
- White, Stephen (1982). "Some Conclusions". In Nelson, Daniel; White, Stephen (eds.). Communist Legislatures in Comparative Perspective. Macmillan Publishers Ltd. pp. 191–195. doi:10.1007/978-1-349-06086-3_8. ISBN 9781349060887.
