= Timpson =

Timpson may refer to:

- Timpson (surname)
- Timpson, Texas, US
- Timpson (retailer), a British multinational retailer

== See also ==
- Timson, a surname
