= Annis May Timpson =

British academic

Annis May Timpson is the former director of the Centre for Canadian Studies at the University of Edinburgh. She is a graduate of the universities of Bristol (England), Oxford (England) and Toronto (Canada). Her research interests include Aboriginality and governance, territorial politics and intergovernmental relations, gender and public policy, social movements and human rights. She served as senior tutor and Director of Education for St John's College, Cambridge, between 2017 and 2020.

== Publications ==
- First Nations, First Thoughts: The Impact of the Indigenous Thought in Canada, ed. Annis May Timpson. UBC Press 2009.
- "Reconciling Indigenous and Settler Language Interests: Language Policy Initiatives in Nunavut." Journal of Canadian Studies, 43.2 (2009), 159–180.
- "Stretching the Concept of Representative Bureaucracy: The Case of Nunavut," International Review of Administrative Sciences 72, 4 (2006): 541–54.
- "Hey that's no way to say goodbye: Territorial officials' perspectives on the division of the Northwest Territories," Canadian Public Administration 49, 1 (2006), 80–101.
- "The Challenges of Intergovernmental Relations for Nunavut," in Canada – The State of the Federation, 2003: Reconfiguring Aboriginal-State Relations in Canada ed. Michael Murphy (McGill-Queens University Press, 2005), 207–35.
- Driven Apart: Women's Employment Equality and Child Care in Canadian Public Policy (UBC Press, 2001) – Winner of the International Council for Canadian Studies, Pierre Savard Award and the Canadian Women's Studies Association Book Prize (inaugural awards). Designated an Outstanding Academic Title by Choice.
- Political Culture in Contemporary Britain: People and Politicians, Principles and Practice (Clarendon Press, 1996) with William L Miller and Michael Lessnoff.
