= Timpson (surname) =

Timpson is a surname, meaning son of Timothy. Notable people with the surname include:

- Alex Timpson (1946–2016), was a British campaigner for children's rights
- Alma A. Timpson (1905–1997), a leader in the Mormon fundamentalist movement
- Annis May Timpson, academic specialising in Canadian Studies
- Ant Timpson (born 1966), New Zealand film producer
- Edward Timpson (born 1973), British politician
- John Timpson (1928–2005), British journalist and broadcaster
- John Timpson (businessman) (born 1943), British businessman
- Makayla Timpson (born 2002), American basketball player
- Michael Timpson (born 1967), American football player
- Michael Sidney Timpson (born 1970), American composer
- William E. Jessop (born William E. Timpson), a leader in the Mormon fundamentalist movement and son of Alma A. Timpson
- Zane Timpson (1995–2021), American artist and skateboarder
