= Timson =

Timson is a surname. Notable people with this surname include:

- Andrew Timson (born 1961), English rugby league footballer of the 1970s and 1980s
- Frank Timson (1909–1960), Australian politician
- Matt Timson, British comic book artist

== See also ==
- Timsons, a British manufacturing company
- Timpson (disambiguation)
