= William L. Miller =

Scottish political scientist (1943–2020)

William L. Miller FRSE FBA
- Born: William Lockley Miller; 12 August 1943; Glasgow, Scotland
- Died: 12 May 2020 (aged 76)
- Other name: Bill Miller
- Spouse: Fiona Miller (died 2020)

Academic background
- Education: University of Edinburgh; Newcastle University

Academic work
- Discipline: Political science
- Sub-discipline: Psephology
- Institutions: University of Strathclyde; University of Glasgow

William Lockley Miller FRSE FBA (12 August 1943 – 12 May 2020) was a Scottish political scientist. He published under the name of William L. Miller and was known as Bill Miller. Miller's research focused on British elections as well as Scottish politics.
