= Stephen White (political scientist) =

British political scientist (1945–2023)

Stephen Leonard White (1 July 1945 – 15 November 2023) was a British political scientist and historian, emeritus professor at University of Glasgow. He wrote many articles and books about the politics of the Soviet Union and Russia.

== Life ==
Stephen White was born in Dublin. He graduated from Trinity College, Dublin in 1967 with a BA in Politics and Modern History, and completed a PhD in Soviet studies at University of Glasgow in 1973, having spent a year at Moscow State University as an exchange student. He later took a DPhil in politics at Wolfson College, Oxford (awarded in 1987). White was awarded the Marshall Scholarship.

His positions included James Bryce Professor of Politics, a Senior Research Associate of the School of Central and East European Studies at University of Glasgow, a visiting professor at the Institute of Applied Politics in Moscow, and adjunct professor of European Studies at the Johns Hopkins University Bologna Center.

From 2002 he was Fellow of the Royal Society of Edinburgh. In 2010 he became a Fellow of the British Academy, Section S5 Political Studies: Political Theory, Government and International Relations.

Until 2011 he was a co-editor of The Journal of Communist Studies and Transition Politics. He died in Glasgow.

== Books ==
- The USSR: Portrait of a Superpower, 1978, ISBN 9780216904859
- Political Culture and Soviet Politics, 1979, Macmillan, ISBN 0333241576
- Britain and the Bolshevik Revolution: A Study in the Politics of Diplomacy, 1920-1924, Holmes & Meier Publishers, Incorporated, 1980, ISBN 0841905134
- (with Daniel Nelson) Communist Legislatures in Comparative Perspective, SUNY Press, 1982, ISBN 0873955676
- (with John Gardner, George Schöpflin) Communist Political Systems: An Introduction, ISBN 0333323009 1982, 1984
- Gorbachev in Power, 1990, ISBN 0521397235
- After Gorbachev, 1993, Cambridge University Press, ISBN 052145896X
- (with Graeme Gill, Darrell Slider) The Politics of Transition: Shaping a Post-Soviet Future, 1993, Cambridge University Press, ISBN 0521446341
- Russia Goes Dry: Alcohol, State and Society, Cambridge University Press, 1996, ISBN 0521558492
- (with Richard Rose, Ian McAllister) How Russia Votes, Chatham House Publishers, 1997, ISBN 1566430372
- (with Evan Mawdsley) The Soviet Elite from Lenin to Gorbachev: The Central Committee and Its Members 1917-1991, 2000, Oxford University Press, ISBN 0198297386
- Russia's New Politics: The Management of a Postcommunist Society, 2000, Cambridge University Press, ISBN 0521583195 (hardcover) ISBN 0521587379 (paperback)
- (with Rick Fawn) Russia After Communism, Psychology Press, 2002, ISBN 0714652938
- Communism and Its Collapse, 2002, Routhledge, ISBN 1134694237
- The Origins of Detente: The Genoa Conference and Soviet-Western Relations, 1921-1922, 2002, Cambridge University Press, ISBN 0521526175
- Understanding Russian Politics, 2011, Cambridge University Press, ISBN 1139496832 ("expands and replaces" Russia's New Politics, 2000)
- (with Valentina Feklyunina) Identities and Foreign Policies in Russia, Ukraine and Belarus: The Other Europes, Springer, 2014, ISBN 1137453117

=== Edited collections ===
- Developments in Soviet Politics, bookseries
- Developments in Russian Politics, book series (9th edition, 2018)
- Developments in Central and East European Politics, book series
- Media, Culture and Society in Putin's Russia (2008, ISBN 0230524850)
- Politics and the Ruling Group in Putin's Russia (2008)
- Handbook of Reconstruction in Eastern Europe and the Soviet Union (1991, ISBN 0582085020
